= List of mammals of New Zealand =

This is a list of the native living mammals of New Zealand. It does not include introduced species, nor extinct Saint Bathans fauna. There are around 51 native mammal species in New Zealand, of which three are critically endangered, three are endangered, three are vulnerable, and one is near threatened.

The following tags are used to highlight each species' conservation status as assessed by the International Union for Conservation of Nature:

EX	Extinct	No reasonable doubt that the last individual has died.
EW	Extinct in the wild	Known only to survive in captivity or as a naturalized populations well outside its previous range.
CR	Critically endangered	The species is in imminent risk of extinction in the wild.
EN	Endangered	The species is facing an extremely high risk of extinction in the wild.
VU	Vulnerable	The species is facing a high risk of extinction in the wild.
NT	Near threatened	The species does not meet any of the criteria that would categorise it as risking extinction but it is likely to do so in the future.
LC	Least concern	There are no current identifiable risks to the species.
DD	Data deficient	There is inadequate information to make an assessment of the risks to this species.

== Order: Chiroptera (bats) ==
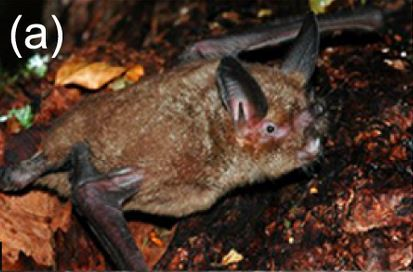
New Zealand lesser short-tailed bat

The most distinguishing feature of bats is that their forelimbs are developed as wings, making them the only mammals capable of flight. Bat species account for about 20% of all mammals. Three species are found in New Zealand, of which one is extinct.

- Family: Mystacinidae
  - Genus: Mystacina
    - New Zealand greater short-tailed bat, M. robusta CR, possibly EX
    - New Zealand lesser short-tailed bat, M. tuberculata VU
- Family: Vespertilionidae
  - Subfamily: Vespertilioninae
    - Genus: Chalinolobus
      - New Zealand long-tailed bat, Chalinolobus tuberculatus CR

== Order: Cetacea (whales, dolphins and porpoises) ==
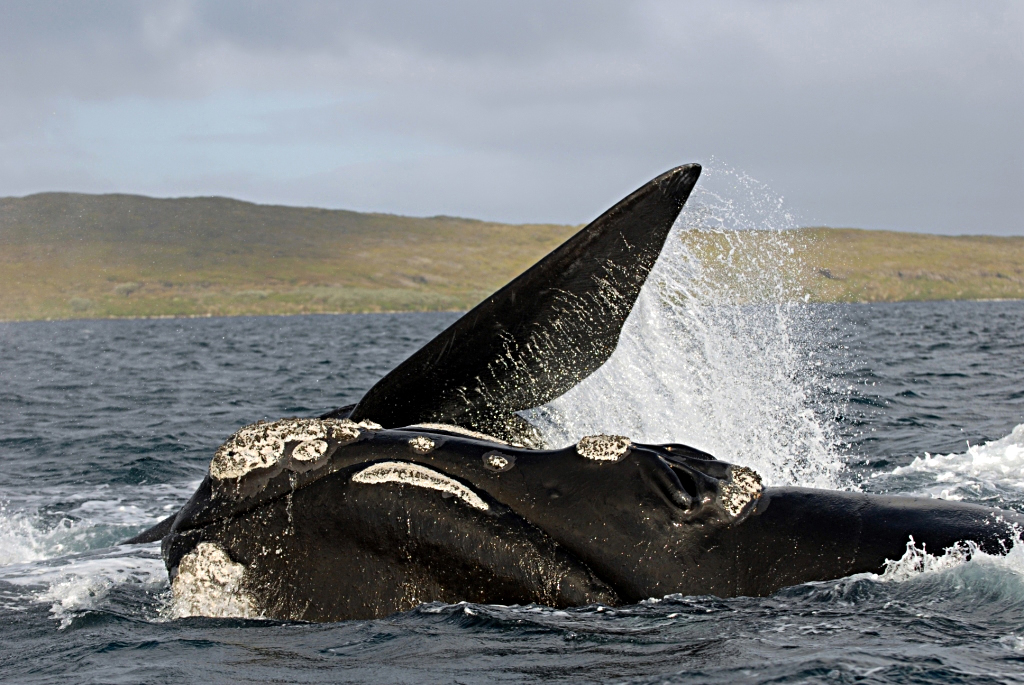
Southern right whales in Port Ross, Auckland Islands

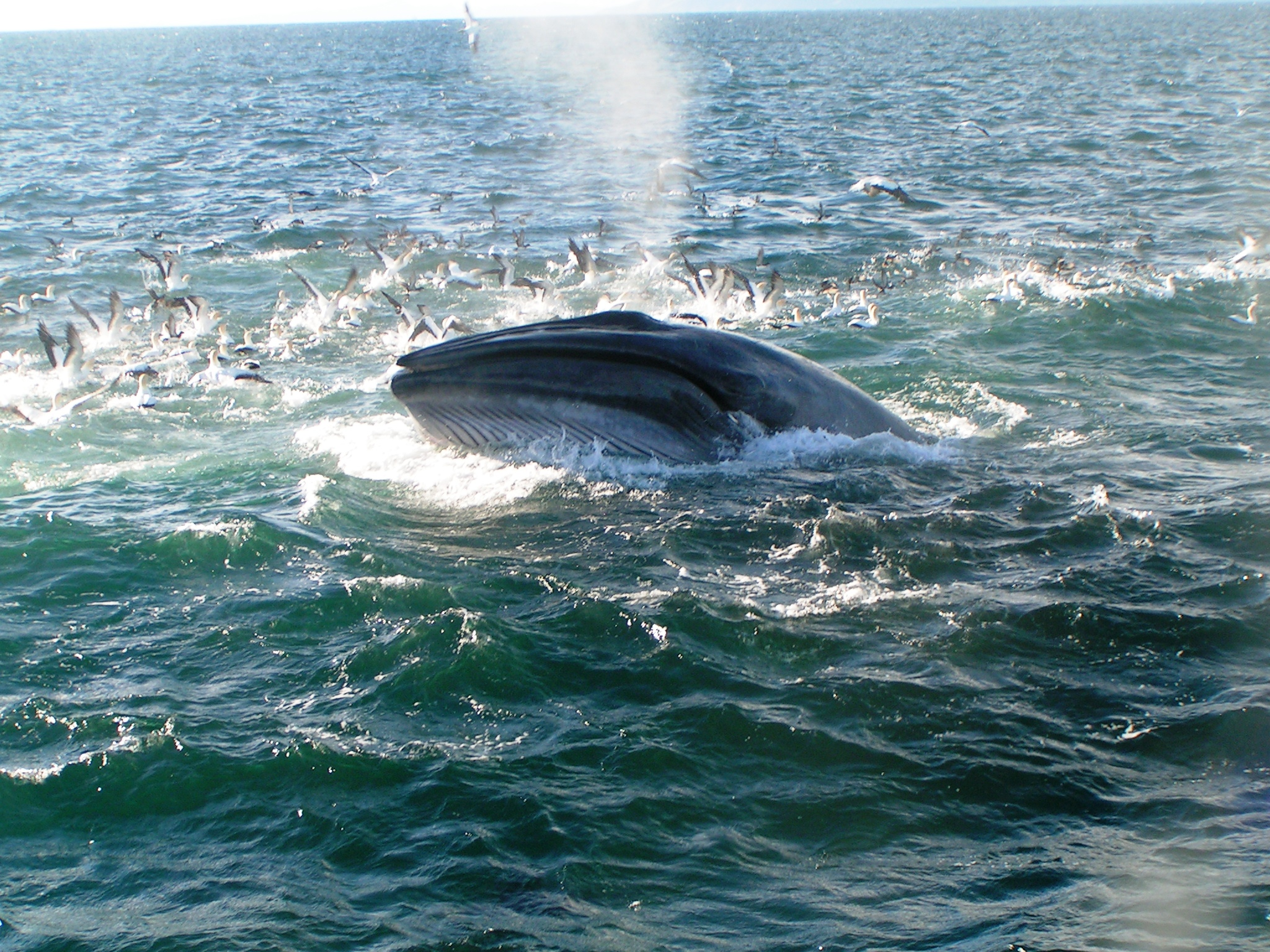
Bryde's whale feeding in Hauraki Gulf

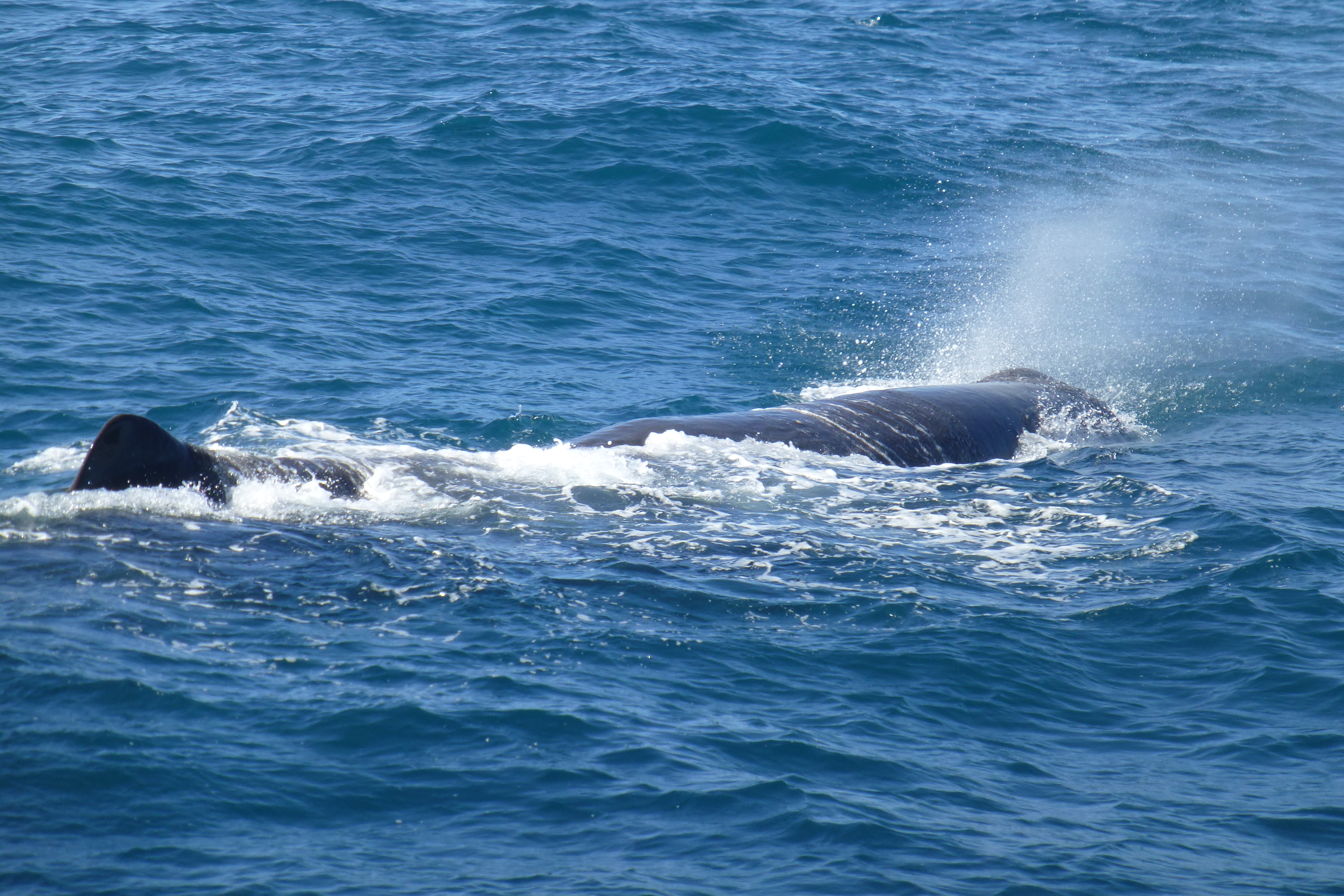
Sperm whales made Kaikōura as a world-famous whale-watching region

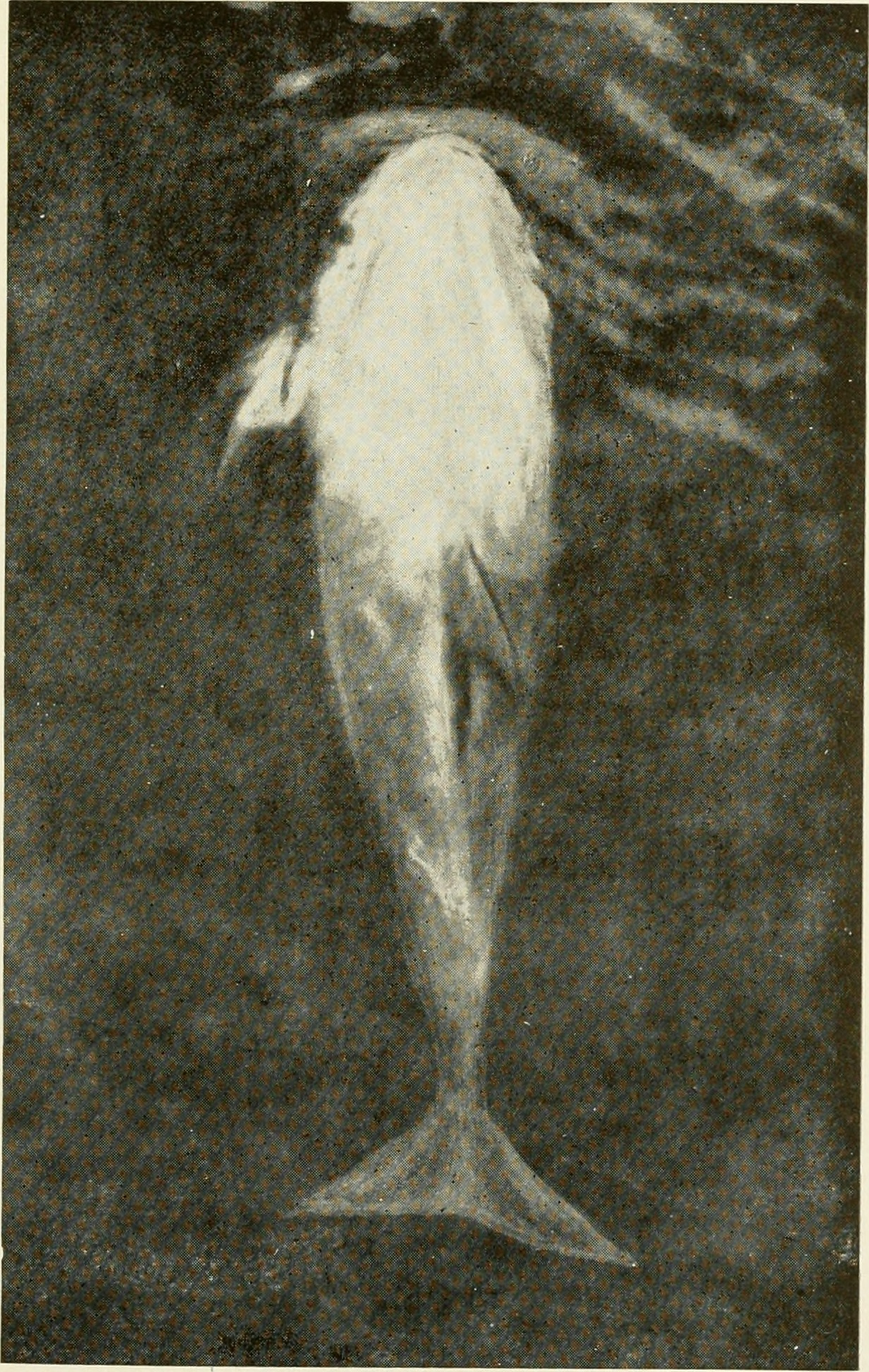
Pelorus Jack

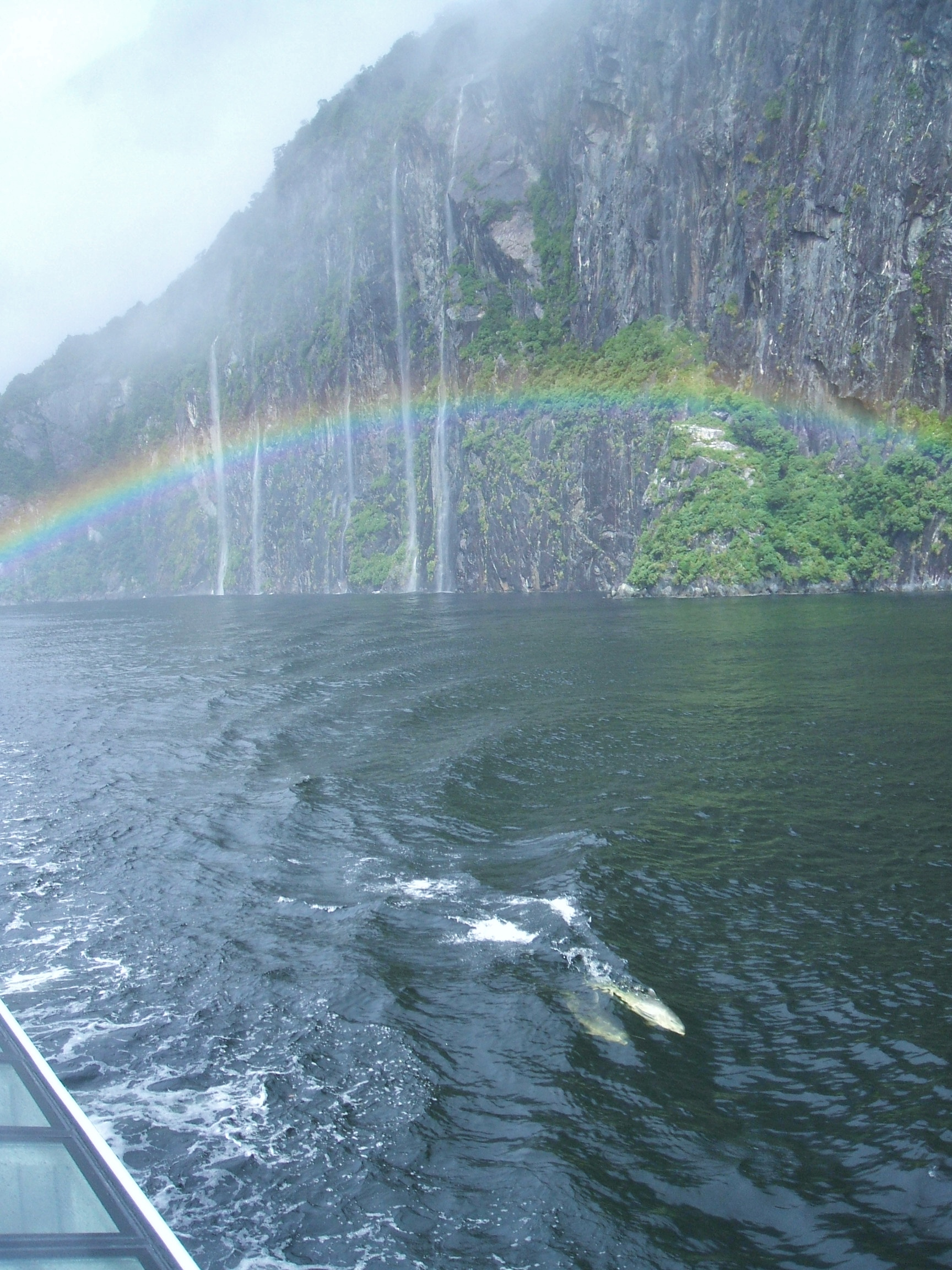
Bottlenose dolphins in Milford Sound

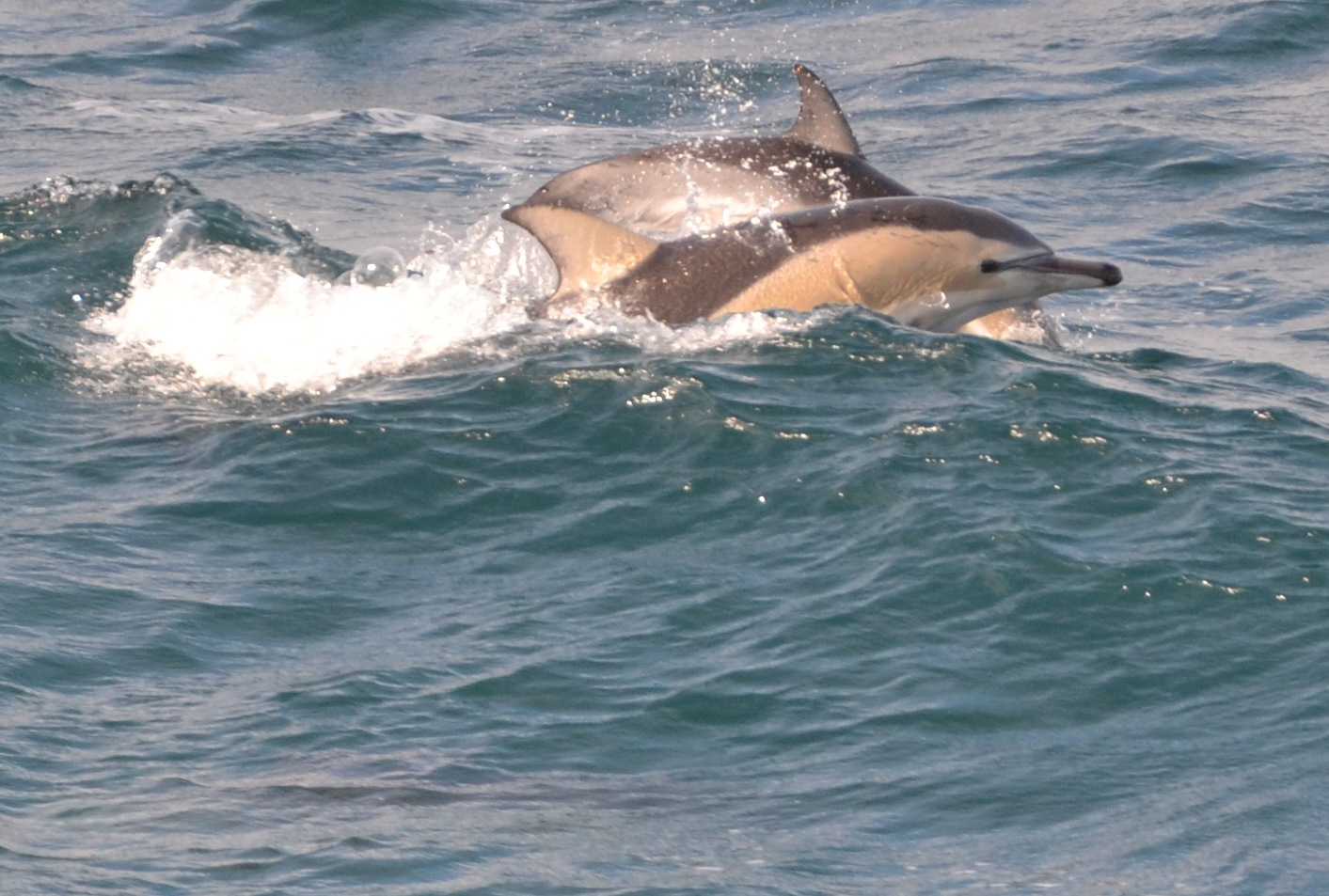
Common dolphins in Hauraki Gulf

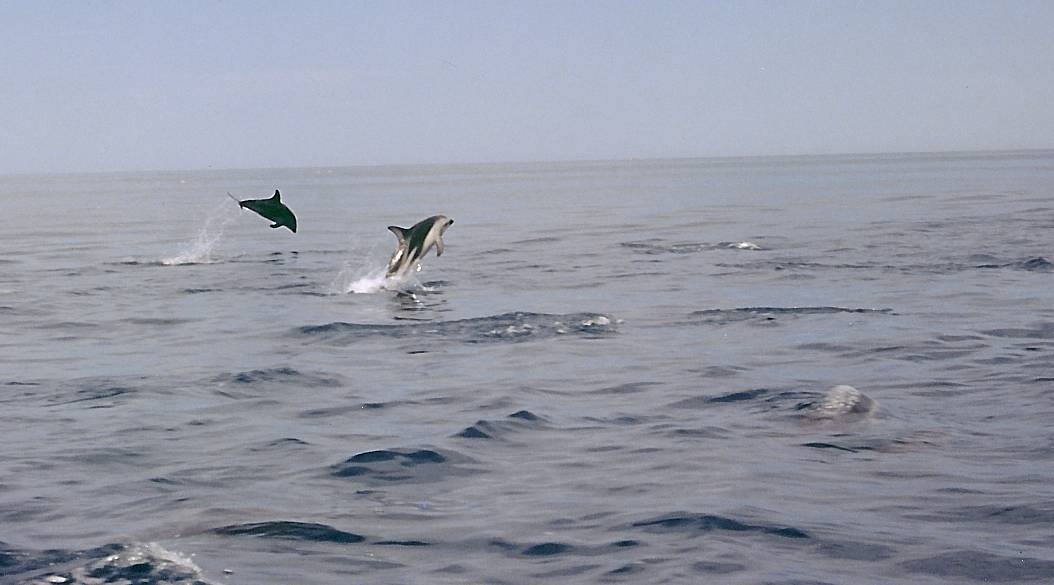
Dusky dolphins off Kaikōura

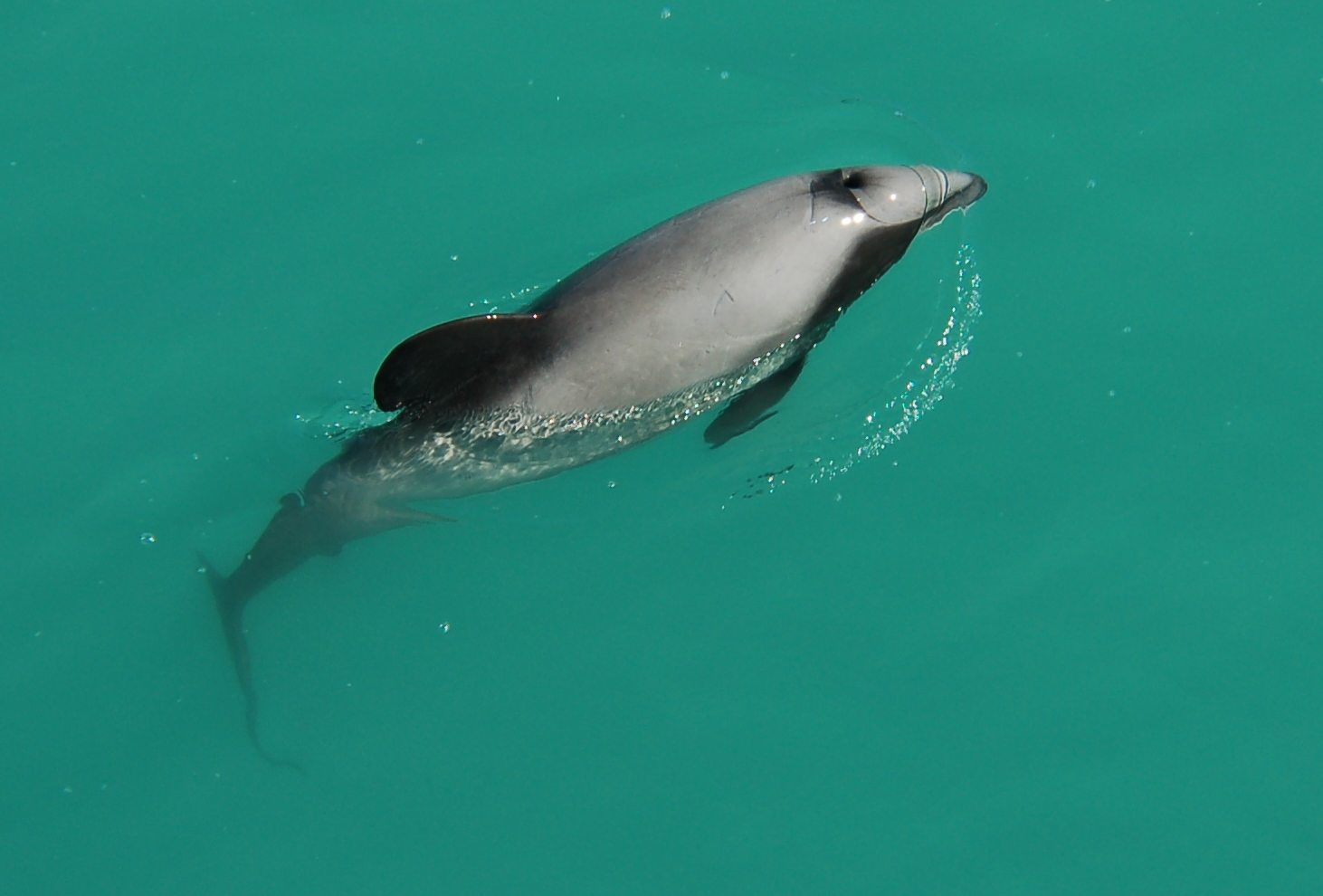
A Hector's dolphin near Akaroa

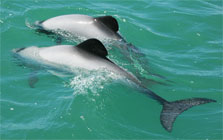
Maui's dolphins

The order Cetacea includes whales, dolphins and porpoises. They are the mammals most fully adapted to aquatic life with a spindle-shaped nearly hairless body, protected by a thick layer of blubber, and forelimbs and tail modified to provide propulsion underwater. New Zealand is the first country in the world to protect marine mammals by law. Around 39 species of cetaceans have been recorded in New Zealand.

- Suborder: Mysticeti
  - Family: Balaenidae
    - Genus: Eubalaena
      - Southern right whale, Eubalaena australis LC
  - Family: Balaenopteridae
    - Subfamily: Balaenopterinae
      - Genus: Balaenoptera
        - Southern minke whale, Balaenoptera bonaerensis NT
        - Dwarf minke whale, Balaenoptera acutorostrata ssp. LC
        - Bryde's whale, Balaenoptera edeni DD
        - Sei whale, Balaenoptera borealis EN
        - Fin whale, Balaenoptera physalus EN
        - Blue whale, Balaenoptera musculus CR
    - Subfamily: Megapterinae
      - Genus: Megaptera
        - Humpback whale, Megaptera novaeangliae EN
  - Family: Neobalaenidae
    - Genus: Caperea
      - Pygmy right whale, Caperea marginata DD
- Suborder: Odontoceti
  - Superfamily: Platanistoidea
    - Family: Physeteridae
      - Genus: Physeter
        - Sperm whale, Physeter macrocephalus VU
    - Family: Kogiidae
      - Genus: Kogia
        - Pygmy sperm whale, Kogia breviceps DD
        - Dwarf sperm whale, Kogia sima DD
    - Family: Ziphidae
      - Genus: Ziphius
        - Cuvier's beaked whale, Ziphius cavirostris LC
      - Genus: Berardius
        - Arnoux's beaked whale, Berardius arnuxii DD
      - Genus: Tasmacetus
        - Shepherd's beaked whale, Tasmacetus shepherdi DD
      - Subfamily: Hyperoodontinae
        - Genus: Hyperoodon
          - Southern bottlenose whale, Hyperoodon planifrons LC
        - Genus: Mesoplodon
          - Andrews' beaked whale, Mesoplodon bowdoini DD
          - Blainville's beaked whale, Mesoplodon densirostris DD
          - Ginkgo-toothed beaked whale, Mesoplodon ginkgodens DD
          - Gray's beaked whale, Mesoplodon grayi DD
          - Hector's beaked whale, Mesoplodon hectori DD
          - Spade-toothed whale, Mesoplodon traversii DD
          - Layard's beaked whale, Mesoplodon layardii DD
    - Family: Delphinidae (marine dolphins)
      - Genus: Cephalorhynchus
        - Hector's dolphin, Cephalorhynchus hectori EN
          - Maui's dolphin, Cephalorhynchus hectori maui CR
    - Family: Phocoenidae (marine dolphins)
      - Genus: Phocoena
        - Spectacled porpoise, Phocoena dioptrica LC
      - Genus: Steno
        - Rough-toothed dolphin, Steno bredanensis LC vagrant
      - Genus: Tursiops
        - Common bottlenose dolphin, Tursiops truncatus LC
      - Genus: Stenella
        - Pantropical spotted dolphin, Stenella attenuata LC vagrant
        - Striped dolphin, Stenella coeruleoalba LC (southernmost record of the species occurred in 2017)
        - Spinner dolphin, Stenella longirostris DD vagrant
      - Genus: Delphinus
        - Common dolphin, Delphinus delphis LC
      - Genus: Lagenorhynchus
        - Hourglass dolphin, Lagenorhynchus cruciger LC
        - Dusky dolphin, Lagenorhynchus obscurus DD
      - Genus: Lissodelphis
        - Southern right whale dolphin, Lissodelphis peronii DD
      - Genus: Grampus
        - Risso's dolphin, Grampus griseus LC
      - Genus: Pseudorca
        - False killer whale, Pseudorca crassidens DD
      - Genus: Orcinus
        - Orca, Orcinus orca DD
      - Genus: Globicephala
        - Short-finned pilot whale, Globicephala macrorhynchus DD
        - Long-finned pilot whale, Globicephala melas DD

== Order: Carnivora (carnivorans) ==
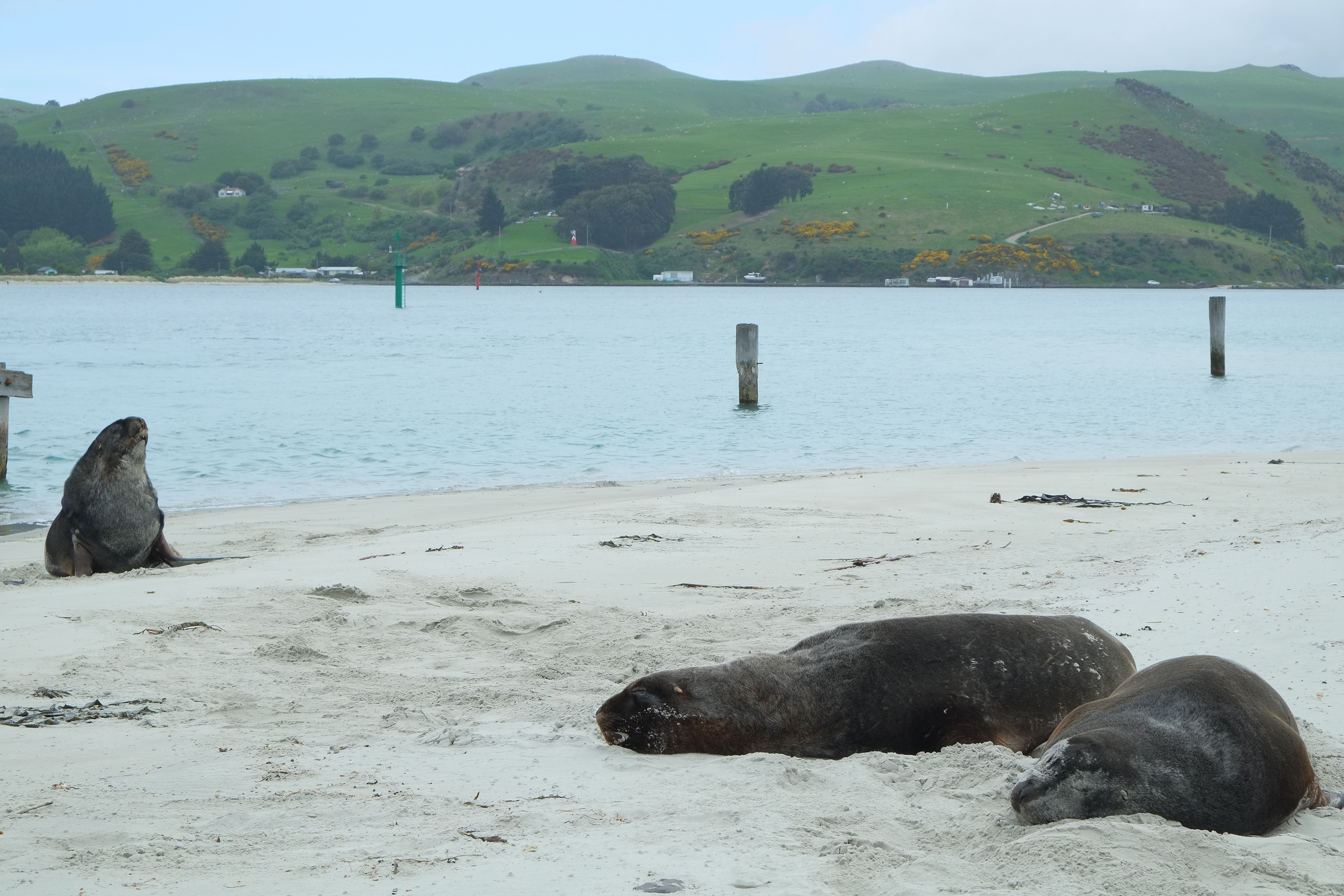
New Zealand sea lions on Aramoana Mole in Otago Harbour

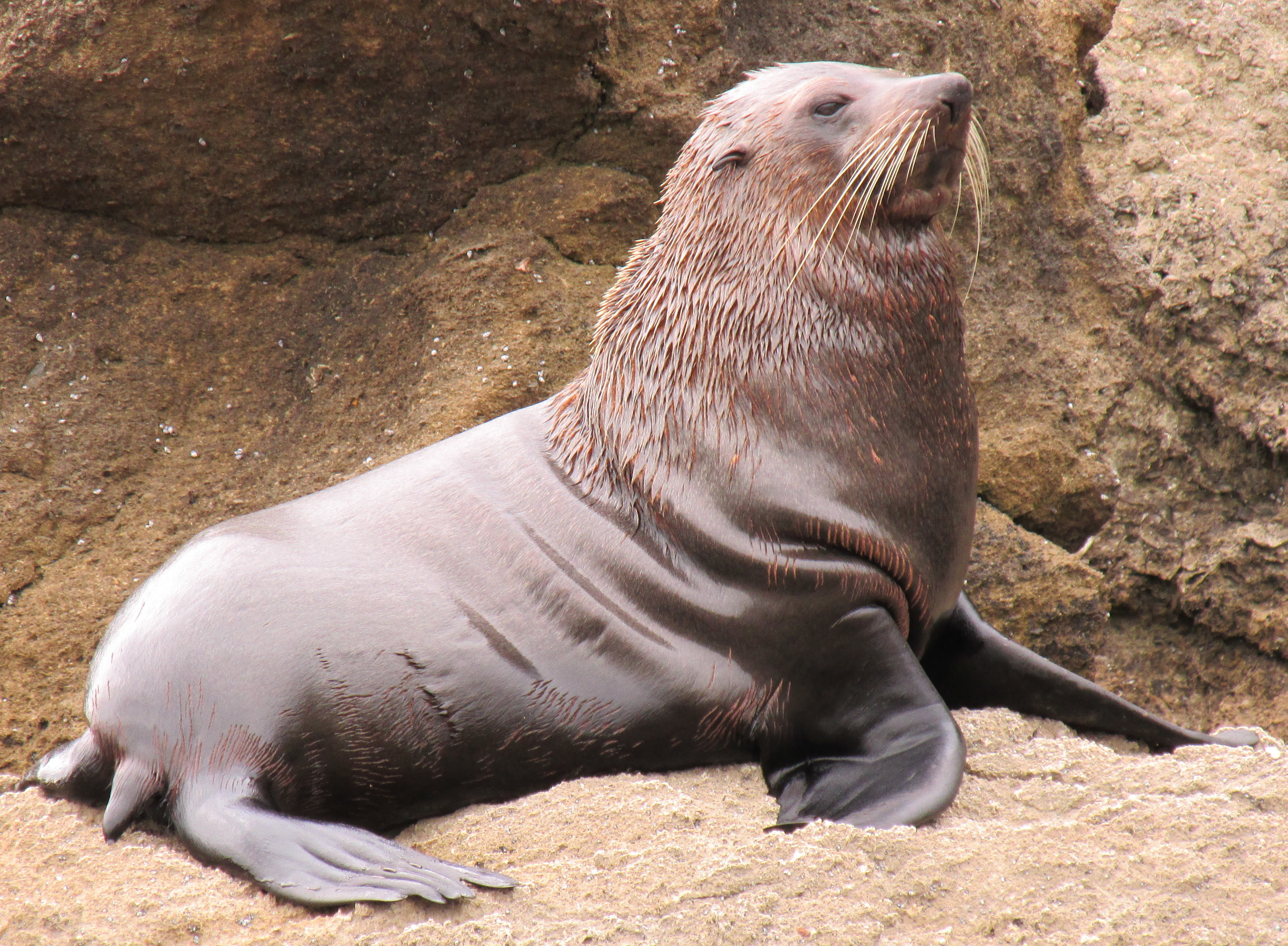
New Zealand fur seal in Castlepoint

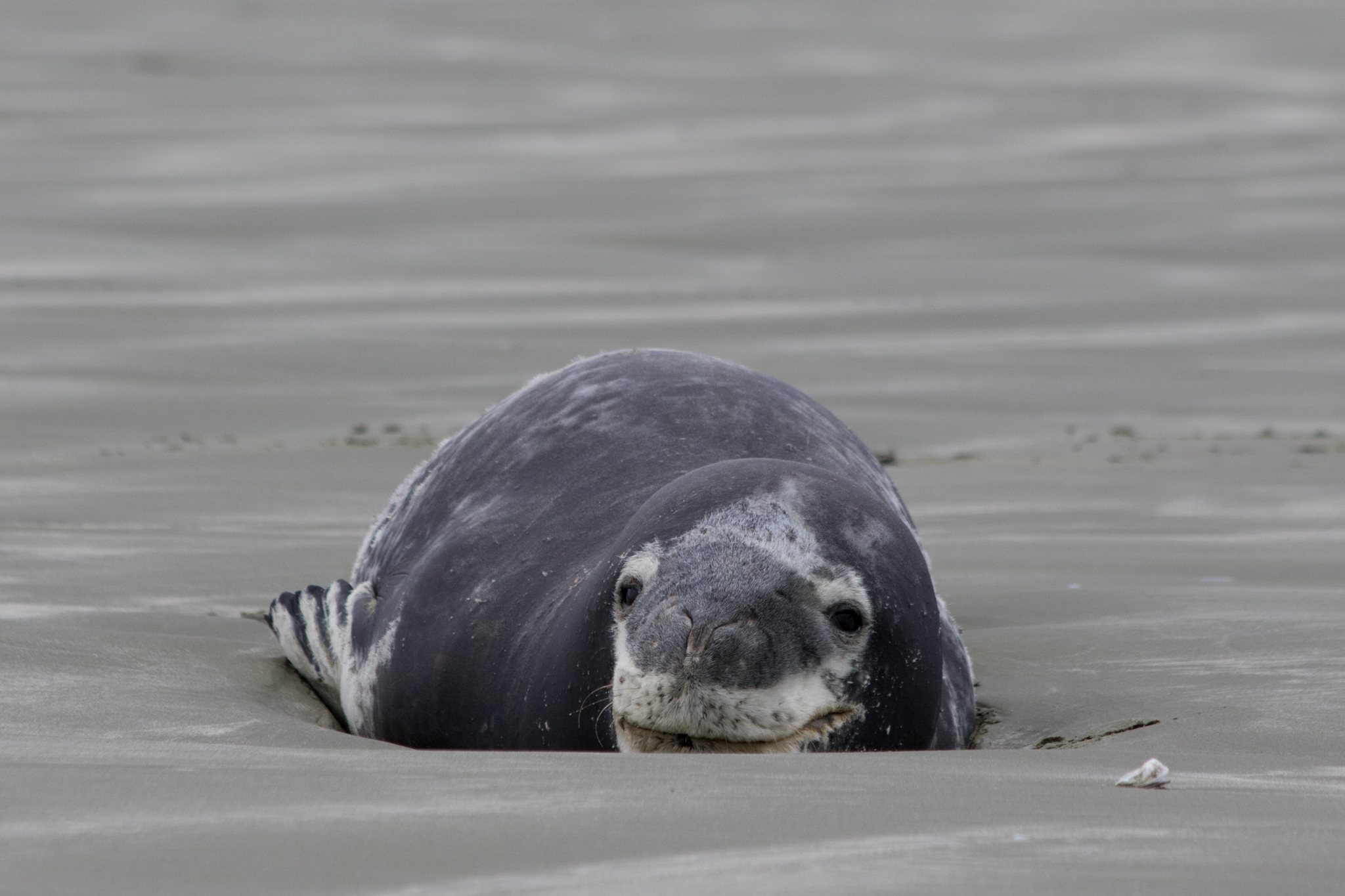
Leopard seal basking in Timaru

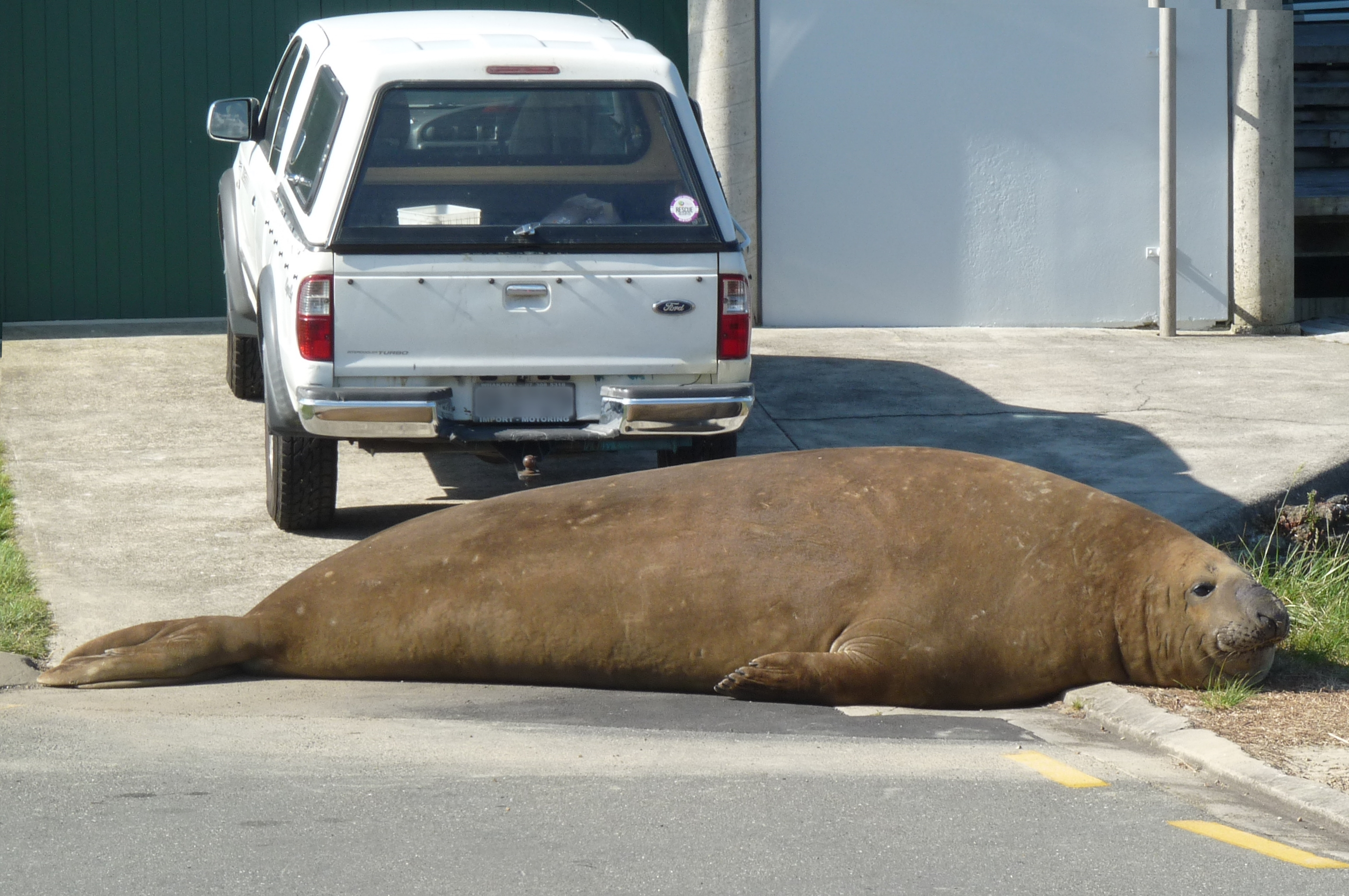
Southern elephant seal basking in Whakatāne

Most carnivorans feed primarily on meat. They have distinctive skull shape and teeth. Eight species are found in New Zealand, all of which are pinnipeds.

- Suborder: Caniformia
  - Family: Otariidae (eared seals, sealions)
    - Genus: Arctocephalus
      - New Zealand fur seal, A. forsteri LC
      - Subantarctic fur seal, A. tropicalis LC vagrant
    - Genus: Phocarctos
      - New Zealand sea lion, P. hookeri EN
  - Family: Phocidae (earless seals)
    - Genus: Hydrurga
      - Leopard seal, H. leptonyx LC
    - Genus: Leptonychotes
      - Weddell seal, L. weddellii LC vagrant
    - Genus: Lobodon
      - Crabeater seal, L. carcinophaga LC vagrant
    - Genus: Ommatophoca
      - Ross seal, O. rossii LC vagrant
    - Genus: Mirounga
      - Southern elephant seal, M. leonina LC

== See also ==
- Fauna of New Zealand
- Mammals of New Zealand
- Pacific Islands Cetaceans Memorandum of Understanding
