= Biodiversity of New Zealand =

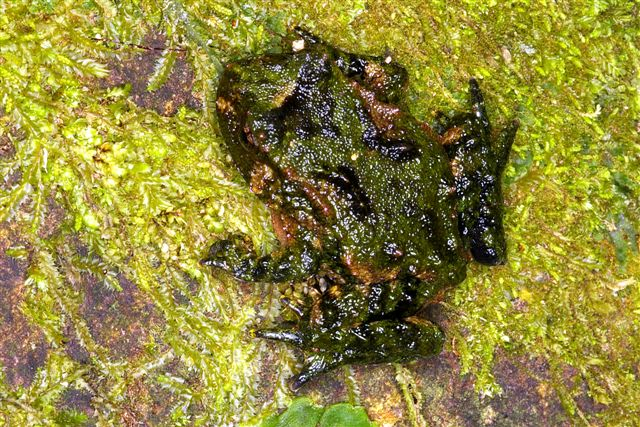
The frog family Leiopelmatidae is endemic to New Zealand.

The biodiversity of New Zealand, a large island country located in the south-western Pacific Ocean, is varied and distinctive. The species of New Zealand accumulated over many millions of years as lineages evolved in the local circumstances. New Zealand's pre-human biodiversity exhibited high levels of species endemism, but has experienced episodes of biological turnover. Global extinction approximately 66 Ma (million years ago) resulted in the loss of fauna such as non-avian dinosaurs, pterosaurs and marine reptiles e.g. mosasaurs, elasmosaurs and plesiosaurs. The ancient fauna is not well known, but at least one species of terrestrial mammal existed in New Zealand around 19 Ma. For at least several million years before the arrival of humans, the islands had no terrestrial mammals except for bats and seals, the main component of the terrestrial fauna being insects and birds. It was not until the 14th century CE that new species were introduced by humans.

New Zealand has developed a national biodiversity action plan to address conservation of considerable numbers of threatened flora and fauna within New Zealand.

== Evolution ==
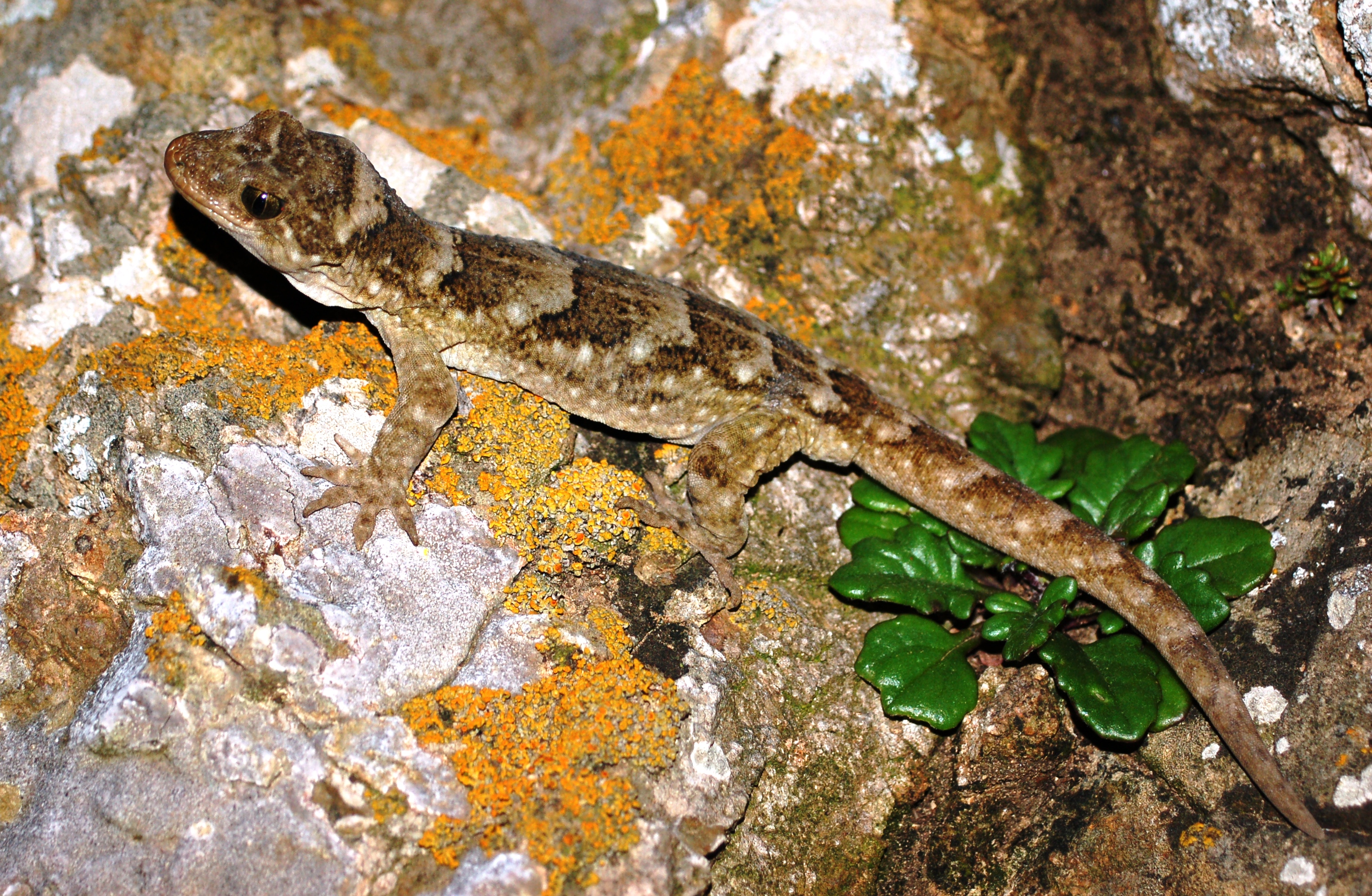
New Zealand's geckos, such as the Duvaucel's gecko, may have had their origins in New Caledonia although Australia is implicated in recent phylogenetic work.

The break-up of the supercontinent of Gondwana left the resulting continents and microcontinents with shared biological affinities. Zealandia (the continental crust from which New Zealand and New Caledonia later developed) began to move away from Antarctic Gondwana 85 Ma ago, the break being complete by 66 Ma ago. It has been moving northwards since then, changing both in relief and climate. About 23 million years ago New Zealand was mostly underwater. One estimate suggests just 18% of the present surface area remained above the water. However geological evidence does not rule out the possibility that it was entirely submerged, or at least restricted to small islands. Today about 93% of the Zealandian continent remains below the sea. Several elements of Gondwana biota are present in New Zealand today: predominantly plants, such as the podocarps and the southern beeches, but also a distinctive insect fauna, New Zealand's unusual frogs and the tuatara, as well as some of New Zealand's birds. It seems likely that some primitive mammals also were part of the original cargo. Whether or not any of these taxa are descendants of survivors of that ancient cargo remains unproven. Recent molecular evidence has shown that even the iconic Gondwanan plants the southern beeches (Nothofagus) arrived in New Zealand after separation of Zealandia from Gondwana. There is a high rate of interspecific and intraspecific hybridisation in New Zealand plants and animals.

The two sources of New Zealand's biodiversity following separation from Gondwana have been speciation and air- or sea-borne immigration. Most of these immigrants have arrived from Australia, and have provided the majority of New Zealand's birds and bats as well as some plant species (carried on the wind or inside the guts of birds). Some of these immigrants arrived long enough ago that their affinities to their Australian ancestors are uncertain; for example, the affinities of the unusual short-tailed bats (Mystacinidae) were unknown until fossils from the Miocene were found in Australia. Cyanoramphus parakeets are thought to have originated in New Caledonia and have been successful at reaching many islands in the region. The link between the two island groups also includes affinities between skink and gecko families.

== Elements ==
=== Floral biodiversity ===
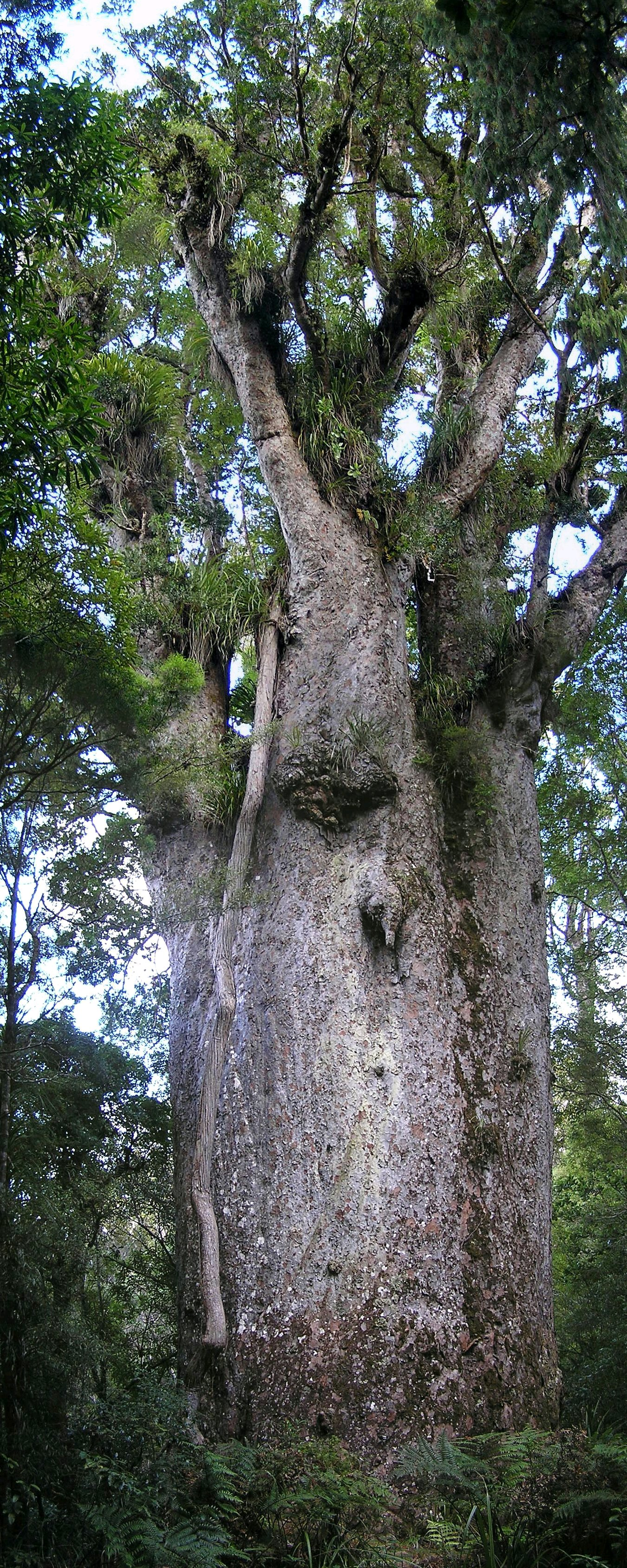
The kauri of North Island were the largest trees in New Zealand, but were extensively logged and are much less common today.

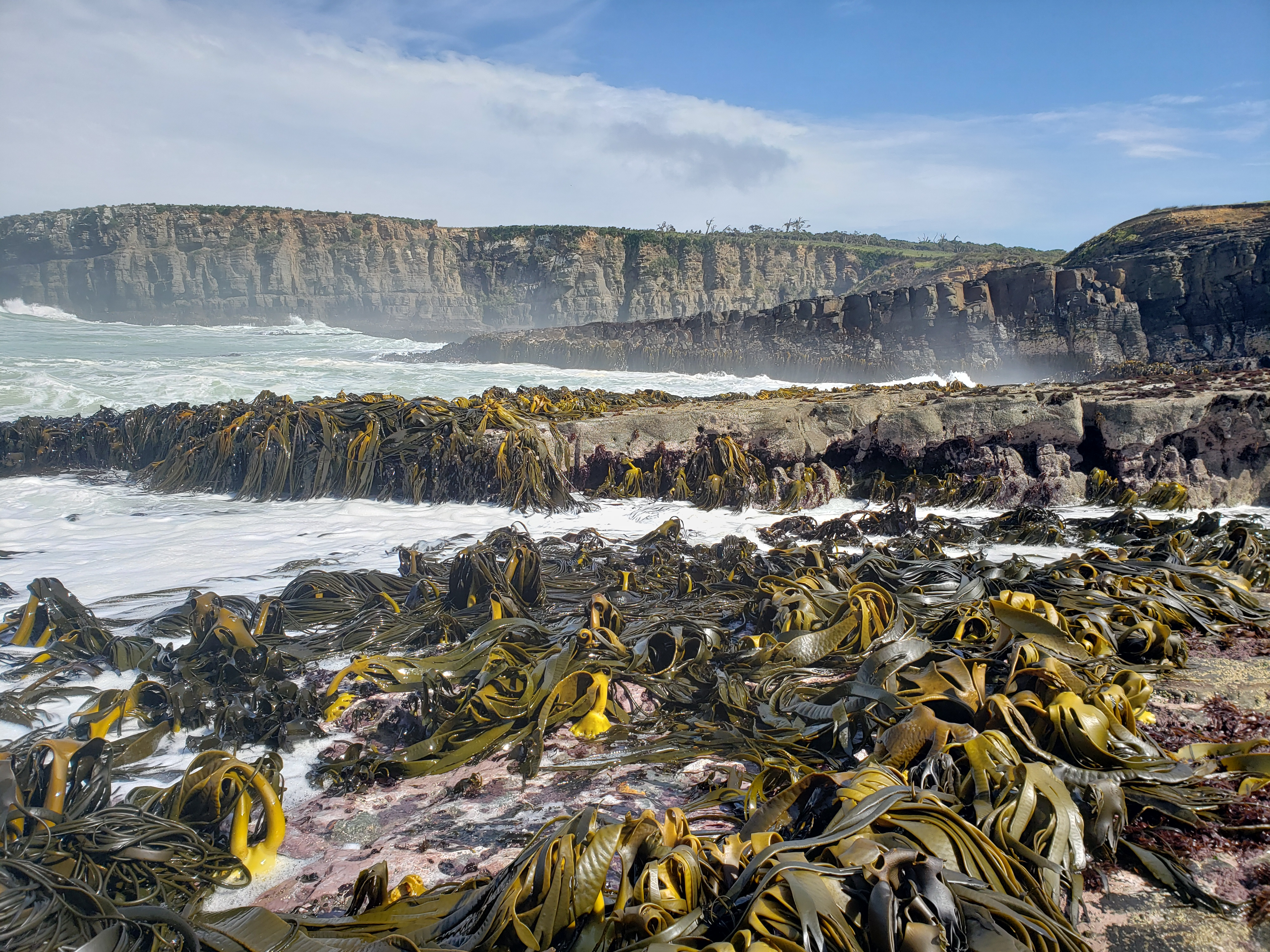
Many species of southern bull kelp are found in New Zealand.

The history, climate and geology of New Zealand have created a great deal of diversity in New Zealand's vegetation types. The main two types of forest have been dominated by podocarps and southern beech. Podocarps (Podocarpaceae), an ancient evergreen gymnosperm family of trees, have changed little in the last 190 million years. Forests dominated by podocarps form a closed canopy with an understorey of hardwoods and shrubs. The forests of southern beeches, from the genus Nothofagus, comprise a less diverse habitat, with the beeches of four species dominating the canopy and allowing a single understorey. In the north of New Zealand the podocarp forests were dominated by the ancient giant kauri. These trees are amongst the largest in the world, holding the record for the greatest timber volume of any tree. The value of this was not lost on early European settlers, and most of these trees were felled.

The remaining vegetation types in New Zealand are grassland of grass and tussock, usually associated with the subalpine areas, and the low shrublands between grasslands and forests. These shrublands are dominated by daisies, which can become woody and 3 m high. New Zealand had a 2019 Forest Landscape Integrity Index mean score of 7.12/10, ranking it 55th globally out of 172 countries.

In addition to terrestrial plants, New Zealand is home to many species of algae. Many species of southern bull kelp are found along the coasts of the main islands, Chatham Islands and the Subantarctic Islands.

=== Faunal diversity ===
Until 2006, it was thought that no mammals, other than bats and marine mammals, had reached New Zealand before humans did. The discovery of a femur and mandibles of an extinct non-volant (non-flying) mammal in Otago, dated at 16–19 million years old, has changed the view of New Zealand's evolutionary history, as it strongly suggests that mammals had been part of New Zealand's fauna since the break-up of Gondwana. The fossil has been called SB mammal. It is not known when, or why, land mammals became extinct in New Zealand but there were none present on New Zealand for several million years before the arrival of humans.

The short-tailed bats (from the monotypic family Mystacinidae), first arrived in the Oligocene or before. These are unique among bats due to their terrestrial foraging habits; this has long been credited to the absence of competing terrestrial mammals, though the presence of the already terrestrial Icarops in the Miocene of Australia shows that their terrestriality evolved in the mainland, while St Bathans fauna mystacine fossils co-existed with another terrestrial mammal, the Saint Bathans mammal. Some plants have evolved with the bats and are fertilised on the ground by the bats. The long-tailed bat (Chalinolobus tuberculatus), a more recent arrival, is relatively common. The Miocene St Bathans fauna also preserves remains of a vesper bat and several incertae sedis species.

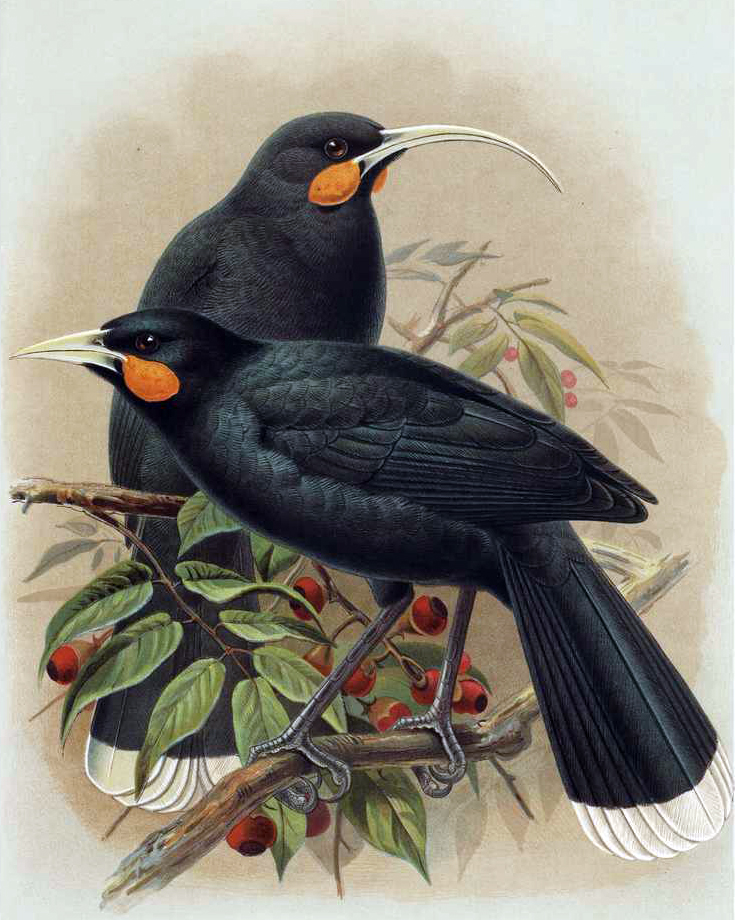
The extinct huia was a member of the endemic bird family Callaeidae (New Zealand wattlebirds).

Birds comprise the most important part of New Zealand's vertebrate fauna. It is uncertain if many birds in New Zealand are descended from Gondwanan stock, as DNA evidence suggests that even the ratites (the kiwis and the moas) arrived after the split from Antarctica. Recent studies suggest that New Zealand wrens are Gondwanan descendants. DNA studies seem to indicate that the wrens are the most ancient of all passerines, splitting from the ancestral passerine stock at the time New Zealand become an isolated land mass. In the absence of mammals, birds diversified into the niches usually filled by mammals in other ecosystems.

The moas, of which there were eleven species, were large browsers, and were in turn the prey species of the giant Haast's eagle. Both the moas and the eagle became extinct shortly after the arrival of humans in New Zealand sometime around 1300 CE. It appears that human hunters exterminated the moa populations, which deprived the Haast's eagle of its primary food source, leading to the extinction of that species as well. New Zealand's emblematic kiwis fill the role of small foragers of the leaf-litter, and the enigmatic adzebill was a universal omnivore. The wattlebirds, Callaeidae, are a family endemic to New Zealand, but many other New Zealand birds show clear affinities to Australia, including the New Zealand pigeon and the New Zealand falcon, as well as various parrots, rails, waders, owls, and seabirds (albeit often with a New Zealand twist). Of the 245 species of birds from the greater New Zealand (the main islands along with the offshore islands, also including Norfolk Island), 174 were endemic, roughly 71%. Of these, about 32% of the genera were endemic.

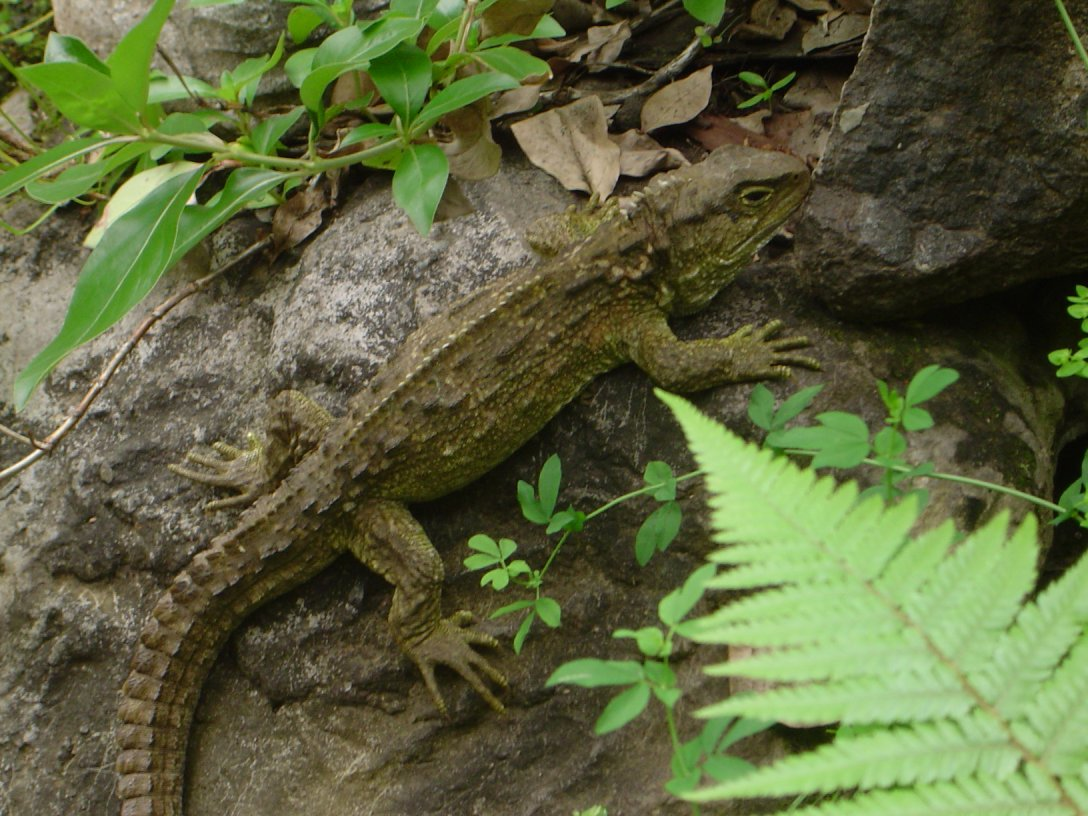
The tuatara is a unique component of New Zealand's biodiversity and the only surviving species in the order Sphenodontia.

No agamas or iguanas are recorded from New Zealand; lizards are represented by geckos and skinks, which arrived multiple times. The fossil record shows a highly diverse herpetofauna during the Miocene, with a mekosuchine crocodile and meiolaniid and pleurodire turtles being known from the St Bathans fauna. The tuatara, reaching 60 cm (23.6 inches), is New Zealand's largest living reptile, a last remnant from the once diverse clade that was Sphenodontia. Frogs, which because of their intolerance for saltwater are assumed to have descended from ancestors that broke off from Gondwana, are one of the few exceptions to the rule that amphibians are never found on oceanic islands (another being the frogs of Fiji). New Zealand's few wholly freshwater fishes are derived from diadromous species.

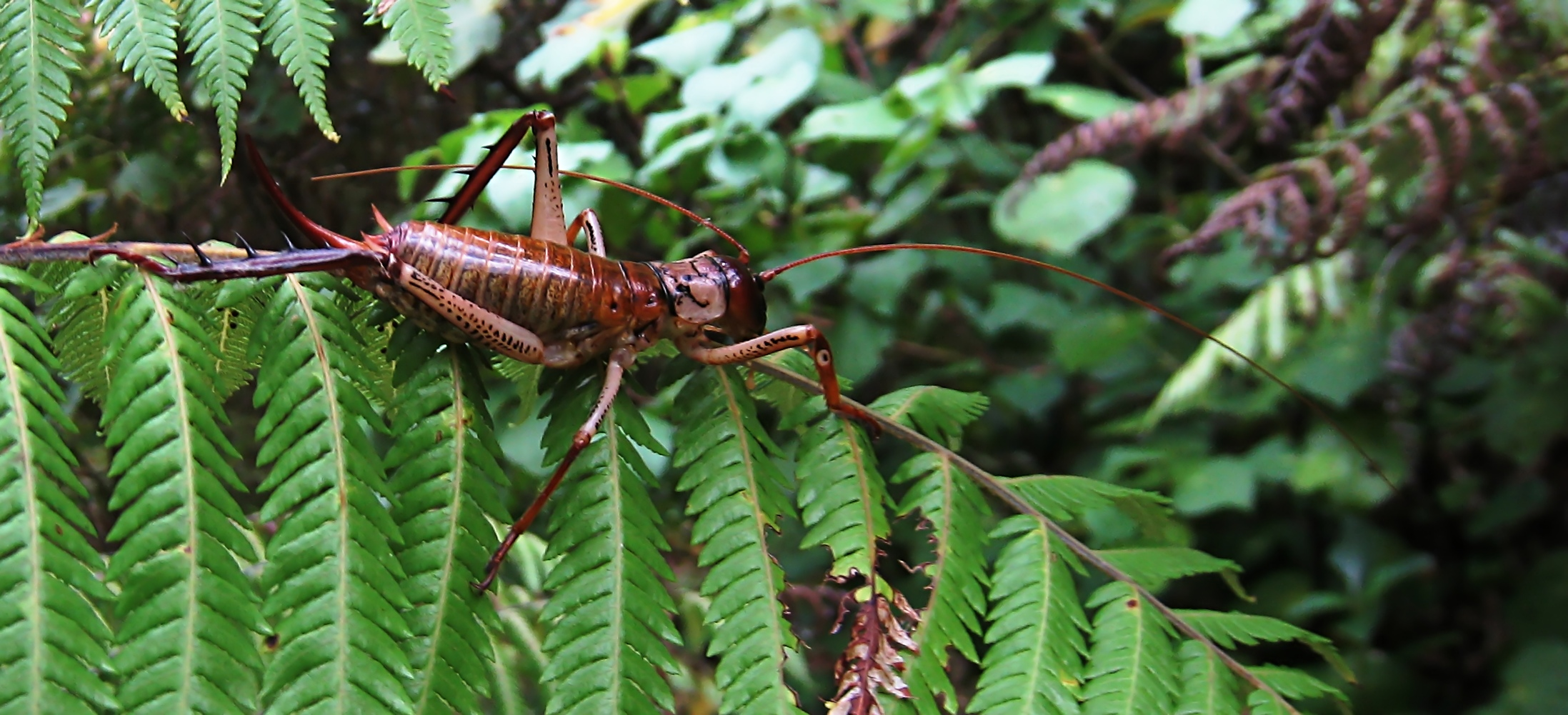
This Auckland tree wētā is about 7 cm long, excluding legs and antennae.

New Zealand's terrestrial invertebrate community displays strong Gondwanan affinities, and has also diversified strongly, if unevenly. There are over a thousand species of snail, and many species of insect have become large and in many cases flightless, especially grasshoppers and beetles. There are, however, fewer than 12 species of ant. The most famous of New Zealand's insects, the wētā, are ground-living relatives of the crickets that often reach enormous proportions. Many endemic marine invertebrate species, particularly marine snails, have evolved in the seas surrounding New Zealand.

== Endemism ==
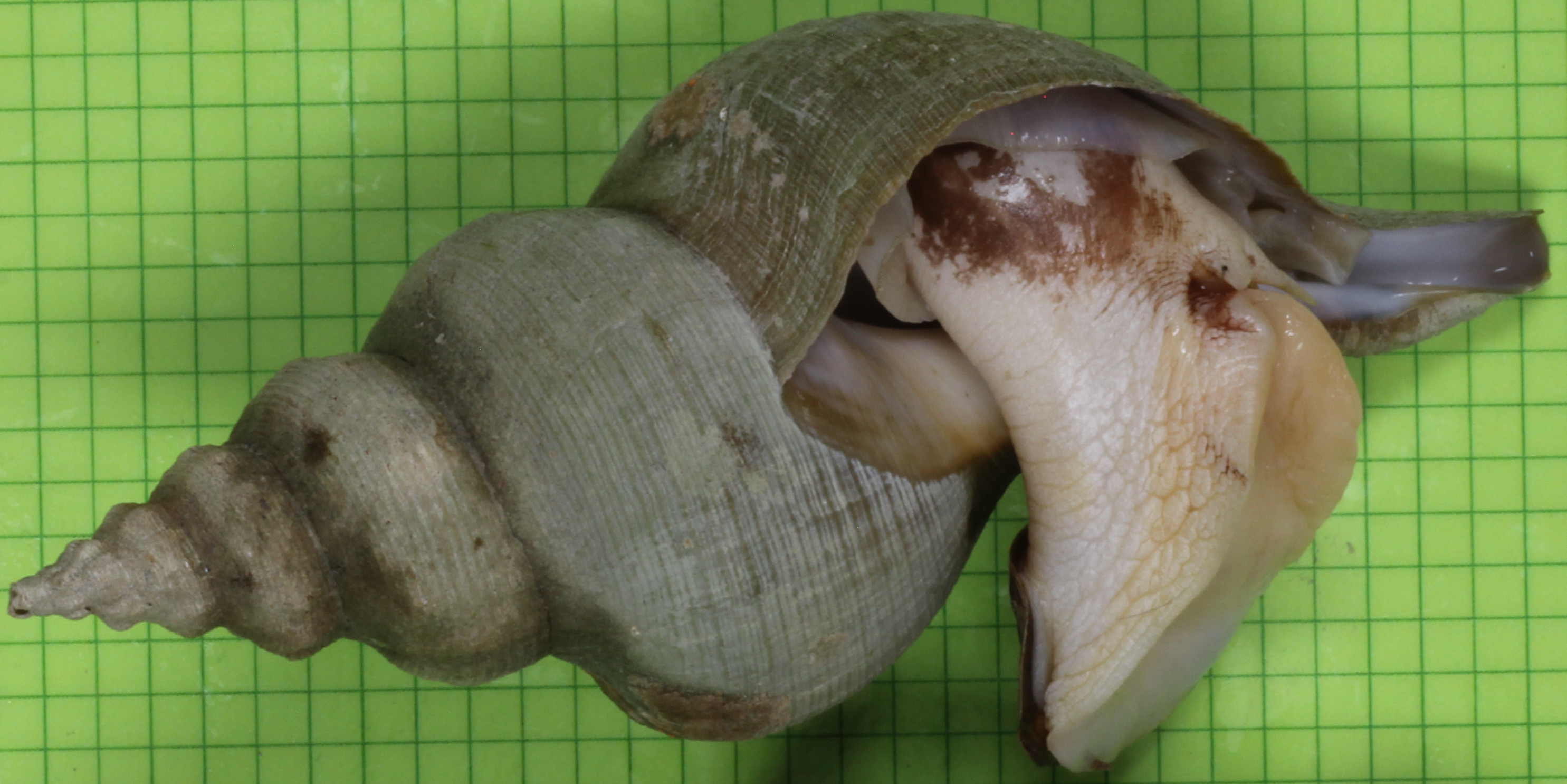
The siphon whelk Penion ormesi is a large, marine snail species endemic to New Zealand.

New Zealand has a high number of endemic species, such as:

- 80% of all vascular plants
- 70% of all native terrestrial and freshwater birds
- All bats
- All native amphibians
- All reptiles
- 90% of freshwater fish
- 90% of insects and molluscs
  - 75% of marine molluscs alone

Of an estimated 20,000 species of New Zealand fungi, only about 4,500 are known. New Zealand also has two subspecies of endemic cetaceans, Hector's dolphin and its close relative Maui's dolphin.

== Human impact ==
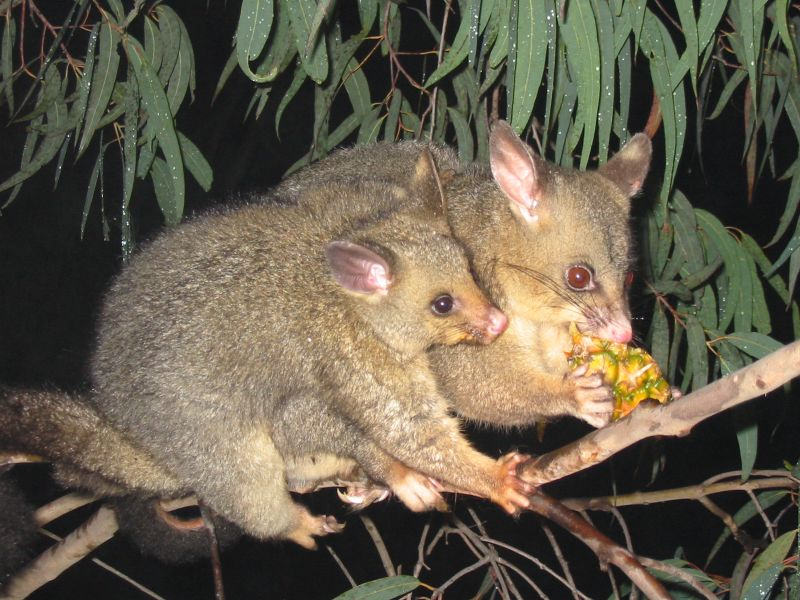
The common brushtail possum is one of the 33 species of land mammal introduced to New Zealand by humans.

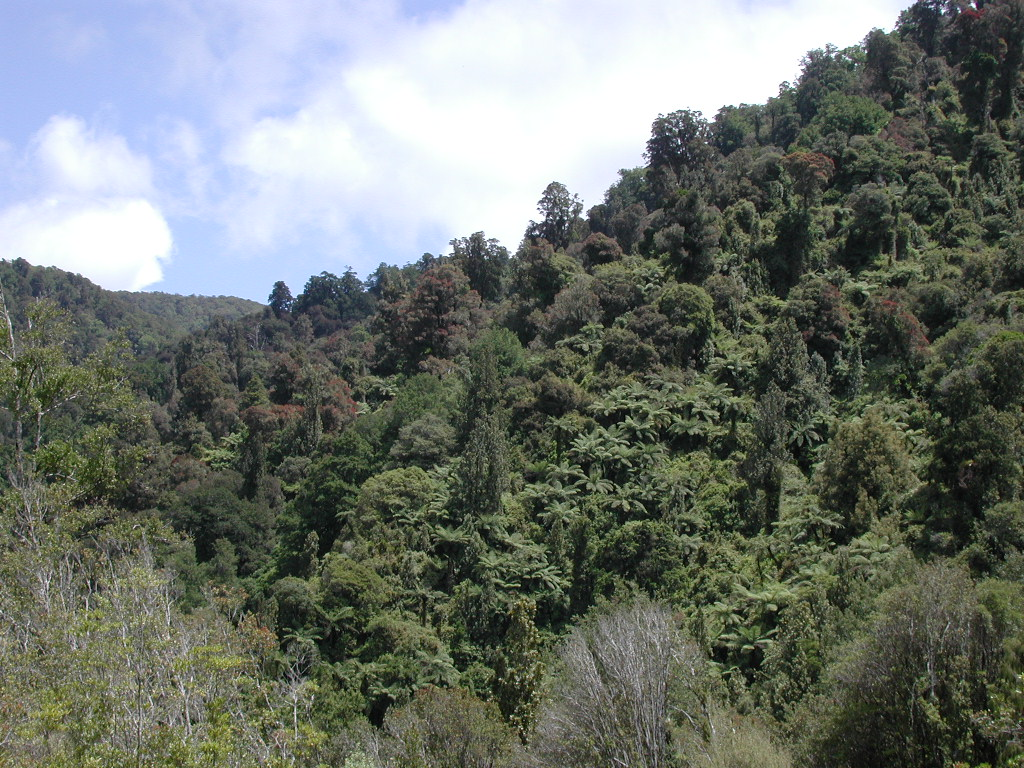
Large areas of native bush has been logged and cleared for pasture in the past.

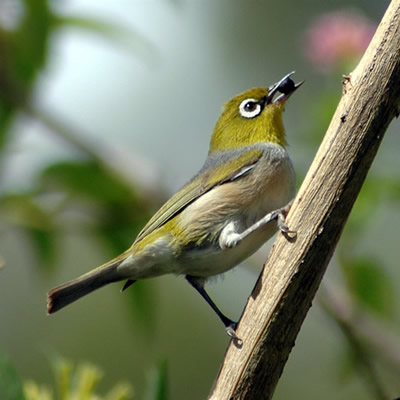
The silvereye is one of several species of birds that have introduced themselves to New Zealand in the wake of human settlement.

The arrival of humans has impacted the natural environment, posing a threat to native species and resulting in the extinction of several. This is predominantly because many species in New Zealand have evolved in the absence of mammalian predators for the last few million years (a situation known as ecological naivety), thus losing the responses needed to deal with such threats. Humans brought with them to New Zealand (intentionally or otherwise) a host of attendant species, starting with the Polynesian rat, and now including stoats, weasels, black rats, Norway rats, brushtailed possums, and feral cats and dogs, as well as herbivores such as deer, wallabies and tahr (a wild goat species from the Himalayas), which detrimentally affect native vegetation.

The date of arrival of the first human settlers (the antecedents of the Māori) in New Zealand is given as around 1300 CE, and evidence suggests that Polynesian rats seemed to have arrived at a similar date. Their arrival set off a first wave of extinctions, eliminating smaller defenceless ground nesting birds such as the New Zealand owlet-nightjar. A second wave of extinctions was triggered by the arrival of the Māori, who hunted many of the larger species, such as the moa, adzebill and several large ducks and geese, for food. The Haast's eagle and Eyles's harrier are thought to have gone extinct due to the loss of their food source. A third wave of extinction began with the arrival of European settlers, who brought with them numerous new mammal species, particularly the predatory domestic cat, and initiated more habitat modification. In all, over 50% of New Zealand's bird species are considered extinct, along with a species of bat (the New Zealand greater short-tailed bat), several frogs (only four frog types remain), a freshwater fish (the New Zealand greyling), skinks, and geckos.

In some instances, the extinction of New Zealand's native fauna has brought about a natural colonisation from Australia. In the case of the silvereye, which colonised New Zealand in the 19th century, it had no relative in New Zealand's original fauna and is now restricted to newer man-made niches. In the case of the black swan (which was originally thought to have been introduced by humans but is now suspected to have self-introduced), the invading species re-occupied part of its former range (the extinct New Zealand swan is now believed to be a subspecies of the black swan). The arrival of the pūkeko and the swamp harrier is more interesting, mirroring the arrival of related species in the past, before they evolved into the takahē and the Eyles's harrier. Once these specialised birds declined and (in the case of the harrier) became extinct, their niches were available and colonisation could occur again.

== Management ==
The New Zealand government, through the Department of Conservation, works aggressively to protect what remains of New Zealand's biological heritage. It has pioneered work on island restoration where offshore islands are systematically cleared of introduced species such as goats, feral cats and rats. This then allows the re-introduction of native species that can hopefully flourish in the absence of non-native predators and competitors. The longest running project of this type is on Cuvier Island, but other islands are also being used such as Tiritiri Matangi and Mangere Island. Establishment of conservation areas is not restricted to islands however and several ecological islands have been established on the New Zealand mainland which are isolated by the use of pest-exclusion fences.

== State of biodiversity 2020 ==
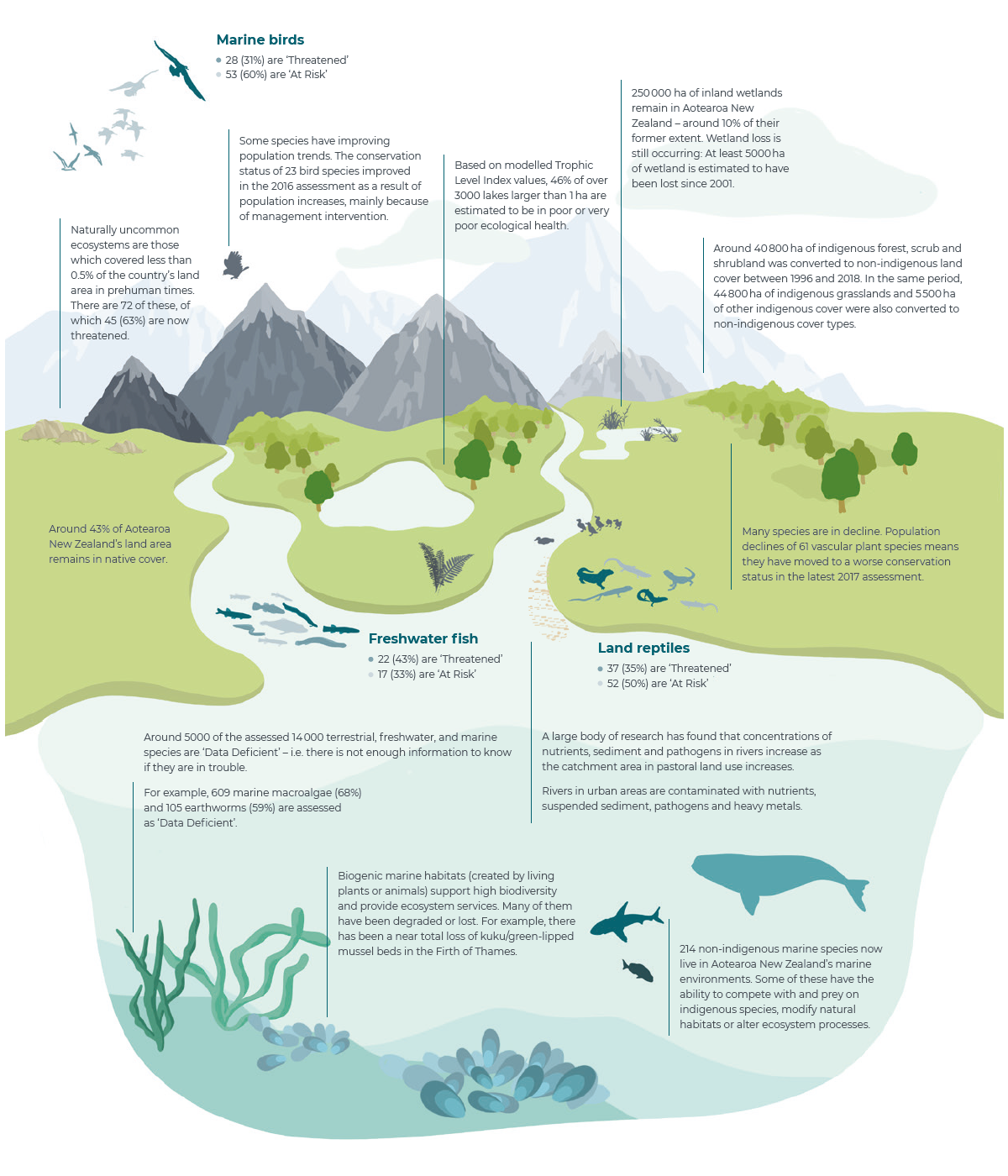
State of biodiversity in New Zealand, 2020

== See also ==
- Landcare Research has biodiversity as one of its major research areas.
- List of ecoregions of New Zealand
- List of extinct animals of New Zealand
- New Zealand dinosaurs
