= Mammals of New Zealand =

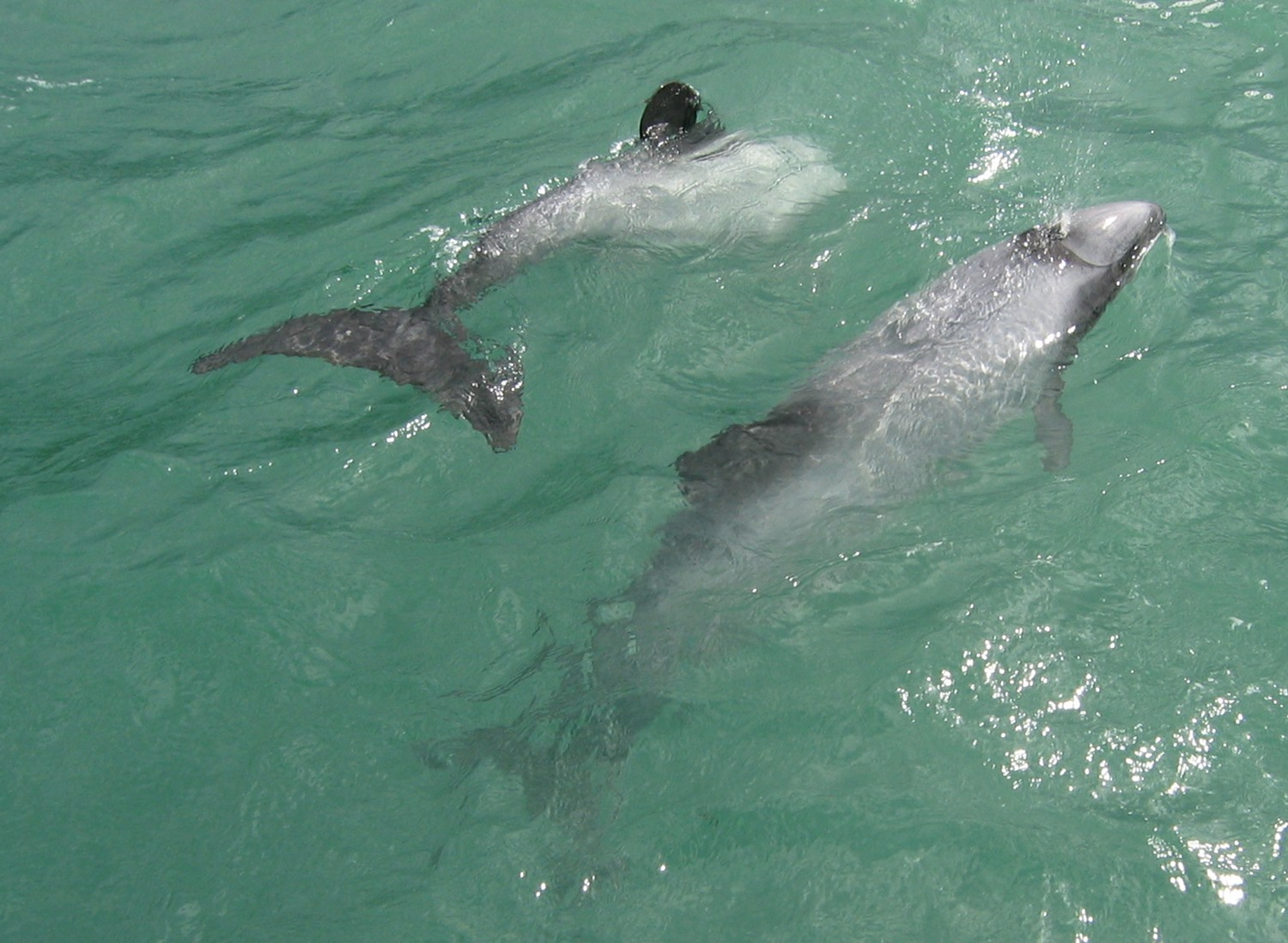
Hector's dolphins at Porpoise Bay, in the Catlins.

Prior to human settlement, the mammals of New Zealand consisted entirely of several species of bat and several dozen marine mammal species. Far earlier, during the Miocene, at least one "archaic" terrestrial mammal species is known to have existed, the Saint Bathans mammal. The Māori brought the kurī (Polynesian Dog) and kiore (Polynesian rat) in about 1250 CE, and Europeans from 1769 onwards brought the pig, mice, two additional species of rats, weasels, stoats, ferrets and possums and many other species, some of which cause conservation problems for indigenous species.

== Native species ==
- Three recent species of bats: the long-tailed, short-tailed and lesser short-tailed. Though they varied in range, Holocene fossils of all three species have been found near Cape Reinga / Te Rerenga Wairua at the far north of the North Island. The Miocene Saint Bathans Fauna showcases a considerably higher diversity of at least four mystacine species, a vesper bat and several incertae sedis taxa.
- Several dozen species of whales and dolphins including the small endemic Hector's dolphin
- Seven species of seal or sea lion
- The Miocene Saint Bathans mammal.

=== Conservation status ===
- The New Zealand lesser short-tailed bat is considered endangered (EN), whereas the New Zealand greater short-tailed bat is presumed extinct (EX) with the last sighting being in 1967. The New Zealand long-tailed bat is considered to be critically endangered (CR).
- The sei, fin and blue whales are all endangered (EN), as is the Hector's dolphin which is found only in New Zealand waters.

The Department of Conservation ranks priorities for conservation with the New Zealand Threat Classification System.

== Introduced species ==
The Māori introduced two species: the kurī (dog) and kiore (Polynesian rat). European settlers introduced all other mammal species.

Mammals introduced by Humans
Species	Year of introduction	Further information
Red-necked wallaby		
Black rat	Late 1800s	
Cat	as early as 1820	Cats in New Zealand
Cattle	1814	
Chamois	1907	
Common brushtail possum	1837	Common brushtail possum in New Zealand
Tammar wallaby		
Elk (wapiti)	1905	Reputedly, as a gift from US President Theodore Roosevelt
European hare	1851	
European hedgehog	1870	European hedgehog in New Zealand
European fallow deer	1860	
Ferret	1879	
Goat	late 1700s	
Himalayan tahr	Early 1900s	
House mouse		
Kiore	1250	
Kurī	1250	
Least weasel		
Moose	1900, 1910	Moose – New Zealand
Brown rat	Before 1800	
European rabbit	1838	European rabbit in New Zealand
Red deer	from 1851	
Javan rusa		
Sambar deer	1875–76	
Sheep	1773	
Sika deer		
Stoat		Stoat in New Zealand
White-tailed deer		Only found in Stewart Island and near Lake Wakatipu
Wild boar	1773	

== See also ==
- Fauna of New Zealand
