= Short-tailed bat =

Short-tailed bat may refer to two groups of bats:

- Carollia, from Central and South America;
- Mystacina, from New Zealand.
