= Icarops =

Icarops Temporal range: Late Oligocene to Early Miocene

Scientific classification
- Kingdom: Animalia
- Phylum: Chordata
- Class: Mammalia
- Order: Chiroptera
- Family: Mystacinidae
- Genus: †Icarops; Hand et al., 1998

Type species
- Icarops paradox

Species
- Icarops aenae; Icarops breviceps; Icarops paradox

Extinct genus of bats

Icarops is an extinct, possibly paraphyletic genus of mystacine bat with three described species. The genus is known from fossils found at three Australian sites:

- Riversleigh in north-western Queensland
- Bullock Creek in the Northern Territory
- Lake Ngapakaldi to Lake Palankarinna Fossil Area in South Australia

The fossils date from the late Oligocene to early Miocene.

The name was derived from a figure of Greek mythology, Icarus, who the authors noted, "flew towards the sun, in reference to the ancient mystacinid that flew eastwards from Australia to New Zealand".

A study describing the genus Vulcanops renders Icarops paraphyletic towards the rest of Mystacinidae, with I. paradox being closer to New Zealand mystacines than to other Australian mystacines, which form an independent clade.

The described species are:

- Icarops

- Icarops aenae
- Icarops breviceps
- Icarops paradox

== Terrestriality ==
Like its modern relatives, the Mystacina short-tailed bats, Icarops shows adaptations to foraging on the ground. This is in spite of occurring alongside various terrestrial tetrapods, including other mammals such as marsupials and monotremes. This shows that the terrestrial habits of mystacines did not evolve due to lack of competition with other mammals in New Zealand, predating the island's colonisation and having evolved on mainland Australia.
