= Vulcanops =

Vulcanops Temporal range: Lower Miocene

Scientific classification
- Kingdom: Animalia
- Phylum: Chordata
- Class: Mammalia
- Order: Chiroptera
- Family: Mystacinidae
- Genus: †Vulcanops; Hand et al. 2018
- Species: †V. jennyworthyae

Binomial name
- †Vulcanops jennyworthyae Hand et al. 2018

Extinct species of bat

Vulcanops jennyworthyae is an extinct species of bat that lived during the Miocene in New Zealand, a large burrowing microchiropteran that probably ate arthropods and plant material around twenty million years before present. It is the type and only described species of the genus Vulcanops.

== Taxonomy and etymology ==
Vulcanops jennyworthyae was described in 2018 from fossilized teeth and bone fragments. The new genus and species were placed within the family Mystacinidae, commonly called the burrowing bats. The genus name "Vulcanops" is derived from the Roman god of fire and volcanoes, Vulcan. The suffix "-ops" is commonly used for bat genera. "Vulcan" was chosen in homage to the tectonic nature of New Zealand, as well as a historic hotel, Vulcan Hotel, in the mining town of Saint Bathans. The eponym for the specific epithet "jennyworthyae" is Jennifer P. Worthy "in recognition of her pivotal role in revealing the diversity of the St Bathans Fauna." Jennifer Worthy is the scientist who discovered the fossils of V. jennyworthyae. The fossilized remains were found in sediments approximately 16–19 million years old.

== Description ==
Based on the mean of several extrapolations from the size of its teeth, Vulcanops jennyworthyae would have weighed slightly less than 40 grams (1.4 oz). Its body mass would be three times the average size of modern bats. It is the largest bat of its family ever described.

== Biology and ecology ==
The presence of a large hypocone on its upper molars indicates that it was not strictly carnivorous. A large, blunt hypocone is indicative of herbivory. It would have lived among the trees while also foraging on the ground. It likely consumed invertebrates such as insects and spiders.

Their diet likely included a range of animals and plants and more closely resembled that of distantly related South American Yangochiroptera species than other Mystacinidae, consuming greater amounts of plant-based foods than the smaller and more carnivorous modern Mystacinid species.
