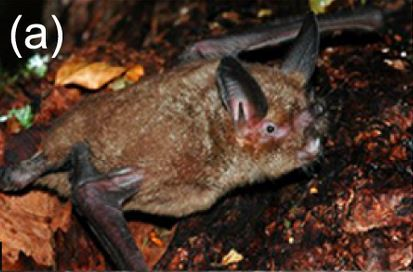

Conservation status
- Vulnerable (IUCN 3.1)

Scientific classification
- Kingdom: Animalia
- Phylum: Chordata
- Class: Mammalia
- Infraclass: Placentalia
- Order: Chiroptera
- Family: Mystacinidae
- Genus: Mystacina
- Species: M. tuberculata

Binomial name
- Mystacina tuberculata Gray, 1843

Subspecies
- M. t. tuberculata M. t. aupourica M. t. rhyacobia
- Key: Range of M. t. aupourica Range of M. t. rhyacobia Range of M. t. tuberculata

= New Zealand lesser short-tailed bat =

Lesser short-tailed bat

Species of bat

The New Zealand lesser short-tailed bat (Mystacina tuberculata) is a small-sized omnivorous mammal endemic to the islands of New Zealand. It is one of two extant and three overall terrestrial mammal species unique to New Zealand. Its closest relative, the New Zealand greater short-tailed bat (M. robusta), was last seen in 1965 and is presumed extinct due to intense predation from ship rats introduced in the last few centuries. These bats are also commonly referred to as pekapeka, their Māori-language name. Lesser short-tailed bats have unique adaptations that differentiate them from bats found in other parts of the world. For example, they are fully capable of moving along the ground to search for food, and the males sing to attract partners, taking turns to do so. Lesser short-tailed bats are a vulnerable species, so extensive conservation work and research are being done to prevent extinction.

== Taxonomy and evolution ==
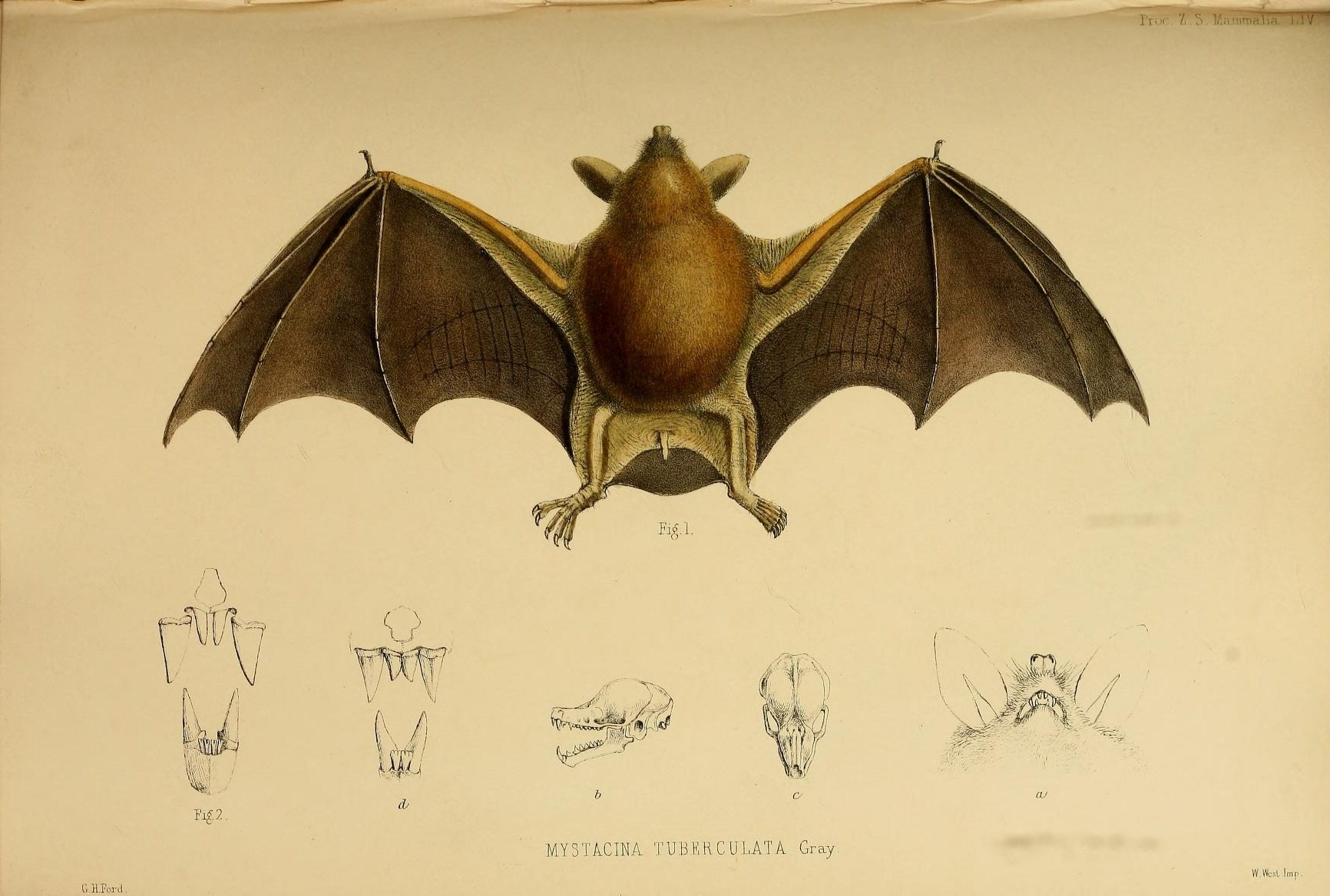
Illustration of an individual

=== Taxonomic classification ===
Mystacina tuberculata are members of the suborder Yangochiroptera and have recently been placed in the superfamily Noctillionoidea. They are members of the family Mystacinidae, which contains the single genus Mystacina. Within Mystacina are the two closely related species, M. tuberculata and M. robusta. As it is likely that M. robusta has gone extinct, M. tuberculata is the only confirmed extant species within the genus and the family. The placement of this species within taxonomies and phylogenetic trees was previously a hotly debated topic. The current standing within the superfamily Noctillionoidea is the result of DNA sequencing and analysis. In opposition to this, some scientists believe physical similarities indicate Mystacinidae falls under the superfamily Vespertilionoidea. The phylogenetic position of this species has had a variety of other suggested propositions, including within the Phyllostomidae (Leaf-nosed bats) or the Emballonuridae (sac-winged and sheath-tailed bats). While this species is considered to have subspecies, some sources refer to the species as one unit. The New Zealand Department of Conservation recognises three subspecies. These are divided by the region each inhabits; northern (Mystacina tuberculata aupourica), central (Mystacina tuberculata rhyacobi), and southern (Mystacina tuberculata tuberculata).

=== Evolutionary history ===
It has been suggested that the Mystacinidae originated on the Australian continent and that the superfamily Noctillionoidea originated on Gondwana. When Gondwana split into smaller continents, the superfamily members became geographically isolated. This isolation led to millions of years of unique evolutionary history for each family. It has been estimated that Mystacinidae first became a distinct family between 68 and 35 million years ago. Twenty million years ago, two genera emerged from the family; Mystacina and Icarops. Fossils of Icarops have been found throughout Australia, indicating the now-extinct species was once well dispersed there. It is unknown when the species within this genera (I. aenae, I. breviceps, and I. paradox) became extinct.

Mystacina migrated from Australia to New Zealand. Based on fossil evidence, this genus was definitely in New Zealand during the Miocene. Therefore, we know that Mystacina became a distinct genus around 20 million years ago and travelled from Australia to New Zealand anywhere from approximately 5.3 - 20 million years ago. This assumes that Icarops did not migrate to New Zealand, and that the colonisation event occurred after the genera became distinct. It is unclear when M. tuberculata and M. robusta became distinct species.

== Distribution and range ==
Lesser short-tailed bats have been found in a few populations dispersed around the country. There are populations on both of the main islands, as well as various surrounding islands. There are a few key populations currently known. There is one on Little Barrier Island (Hauturu), one near the top of the North Island, seven in the central area of the North Island, and one on the south-eastern side of the North Island. There are at least two on the mainland of the South Island; and one on Codfish island further south. The bats can live at a wide range of altitudes, from sea level to high up among the forest-covered mountains. M. tuberculata prefer to live in untouched forest settings. However, they have been reported in various habitats, such as farmland and shrubland.

== Anatomy and physiology ==
The lesser short-tailed bats appear similar to their microbat relatives. They are small in size, and typically weigh between 12 and 15 grams (0.42 and 0.53 oz) once fully grown. They have relatively large ears compared to their head and body sizes, which face forward to assist with echolocation. Lesser short-tailed bats also have relatively large nostrils that face outwards, allowing these animals to use olfaction to guide their movements. Their eyes are small and their vision is relatively weak, justifying their reliance on sound and olfactory senses. These features are common throughout Chiroptera.

Their wings are relatively smaller than those of other bat species. Because of this, they have reduced agility, and cannot fly as fast. Despite this, they are still very capable of flight; just less so than other bat species. Each bat is covered in a layer of thick fur that ranges in colour from light brown to dark brown. The underbelly is typically a lighter colour than the rest of the body. At the posterior end of their bodies are short yet strong hindlegs, useful in their terrestrial locomotion. The relatively short stubby tails are what gives this species its common name. At the top centre of each forelimb, the thumb extends outwards. This, as well as their toes, are equipped with nails referred to as basal talons. Having distinct talons further enables movement along the ground, and are useful when climbing trees. Basal talons are not seen in other Chiropteran species.

=== Torpor ===
One of the key adaptations the lesser short-tailed bats have is entering a state of torpor. Torpor allows for continued survival during periods of physiological stress, such as when the air temperature drops during winter. During this state, the bats are inactive and only essential body functions are operating to reduce energy expenditure. Entering torpor slows the body's metabolic rate down, yet it is different from hibernation, as the periods are much shorter and repetitive.

The duration of torpor is usually a few to several hours at a time, and the bats will enter this state many times within a season. Torpor is utilised throughout the year, but in particular during winter, where they also enter into this state for longer each time.

== Foraging and diet ==
=== Preferred foods ===
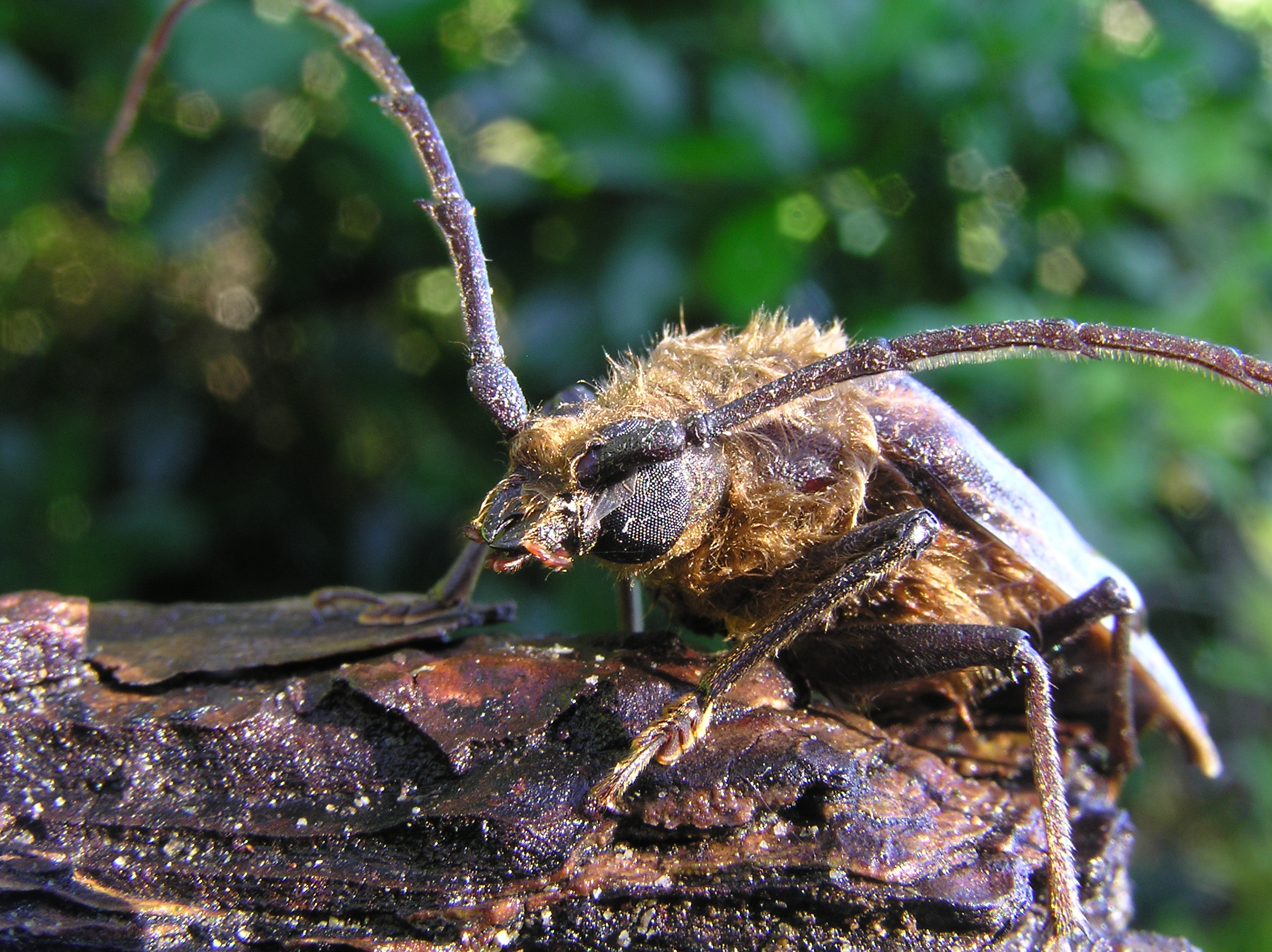
Huhu beetle

New Zealand lesser short-tailed bats are omnivores. Their diet consists of various food items, typically including insects, other small invertebrates, fruit, and flower parts. In general, they prefer to consume insects when possible. One study found traces of moths, spiders, and huhu beetles present in their guano. Another study found that these bats are capable of consuming half their body weight in moths. An average body weight of 12 to 15 grams (0.42 to 0.53 oz) equates to 6 to 7.5 grams (0.21 to 0.26 oz) of moths eaten per day. The bats consume include nectar and pollen, the latter of which is believed to provide them with protein. However, there has been speculation and debate on whether the bats consume the pollen intentionally or if the pollen found in their guano was actually ingested by their prey. Nectar is consumed as the sugars provide a good, uncomplicated source of energy. Lesser short-tailed bats are an important pollinator species within New Zealand through their consumption of flowers (either by ingestion or secondarily through their prey). Researchers found that these bats will carry large quantities of pollen from a select few plant species, such as Collospermum microspermum and Dactylanthus taylorii (the Wood rose). Ensuring conservation of the lesser short-tailed bats may also ensure conservation of the plant species they pollinate.

=== Foraging methods ===
One of the defining features of New Zealand lesser short-tailed bats is their ability to forage both in the air and on the ground. Their ability to forage on the ground is unusual for a bat species. However, New Zealand's early geographic separation around 80 million years ago meant the islands developed free from predators. Without predators, the lesser short-tailed bat evolved to survive in both aerial and ground habitats. Like other bats, in the air, they catch food by using echolocation to detect the location of prey. The lesser short-tailed bats forage on the ground by moving around on their limbs, sourcing prey by using olfaction. The species has several adaptations that aid in their search for food on the ground. For example, when on the ground, individuals will fold in their wings to utilise them as forelimbs—all four limbs in quadrupedal locomotion. In addition, they have talons specialised in helping them dig down among leaf litter and dirt layers for prey. While moving about terrestrially, the bats walk similarly to other four-legged animals. New Zealand lesser short-tailed bats have an increased sense of smell compared with other bats, as seen in their relatively larger and rounder nostrils. Although, like other bats, they are not blind they are not heavily reliant on visual hunting, with cues like scent and sound being much more critical. Foraging on the ground can be used to dig up insects and spiders, collect flowers or fallen fruit, and collect other stationary forms of food. Foraging in the air is often associated with hunting flying insects, such as moths. During heavy rain foraging is uncommon, and during lighter rain foraging activity increases slightly.

Bat using echolocation to hunt prey

=== Echolocation ===
Like other microbats, these bats employ echolocation when flying. Lesser short-tailed bats emit sounds in the range of 20-40 kHz. Each call lasts between seven and nine milliseconds. Echolocation does not work as efficiently while foraging on the ground, because the echoes can be disrupted by the forest floor and anything occupying this space. Another reason echolocation does not work when foraging on the ground is that the echoes bouncing back can interrupt the new echoes being sent out, causing confusion for the animal and preventing the system from working correctly. This issue does not occur when the bats are mid-air, as the sound has more distance to travel, and fewer objects could disrupt the signal or cause confusion.

== Life cycle and social systems ==
=== Social systems and mating behaviour ===
Lesser short-tailed bats form fission-fusion societies. This means populations will congregate at certain times, separate, and recongregate later. Where these animals group together are known as roosts. For roosting, they prefer to find trees with large internal cavities, where they create their 'home'. A roosting site will contain multiple trees within the same general vicinity. The number of individuals present at a roosting site vary greatly, with some colonies consisting of hundreds or thousands of individual bats.

Male bats attempt to attract a mate during the spring and summer months before mating begins, which is usually during autumn (March–May in New Zealand). Like many other species, the males attract mates at night by using vocal calls. The males will sing from one of the roosting trees within the colony for several minutes. Multiple males will aggregate at this same roost, taking turns singing. This behaviour is classified as a lek breeding system. In this type of mating, sexual selection occurs, as the males signal to potential females in the hopes they will be impressed and mate with the male. Lek breeding is how the male bats 'prove their worth'. The mating events that follow are non-monogamous, and males have been observed to mate with multiple different females. While lek breeding systems are observed throughout the animal kingdom, they are rare in bats and have only been observed in one other species.

=== Early life and life cycle ===
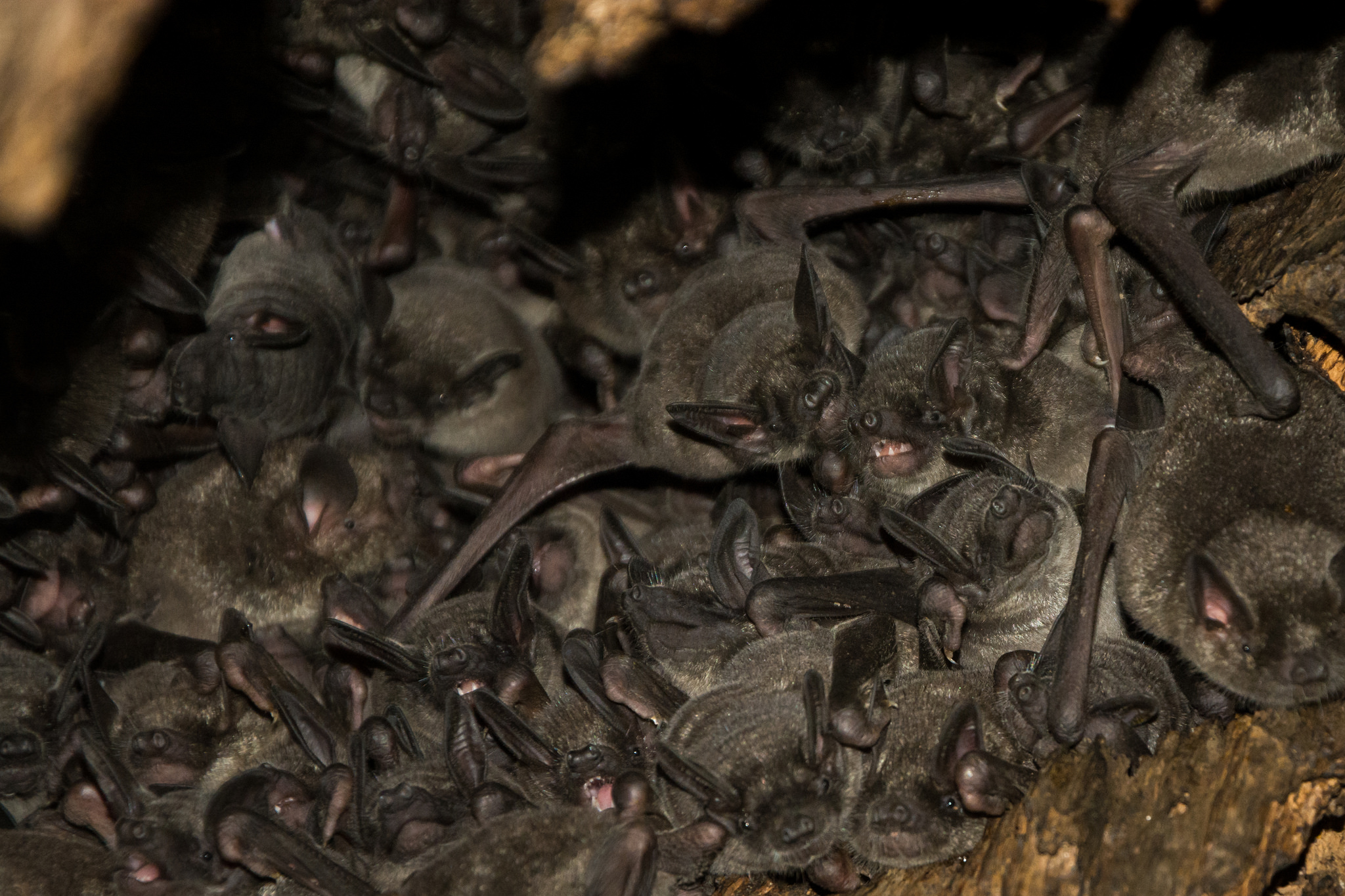
Lesser short-tailed bats roosting

Lesser short-tailed bat pups become active within a day of being born. For the first two days, they are hairless, with underdeveloped teeth, wings, and ears. The pups are capable of flying within roughly four weeks. Six weeks post-birth, they leave the maternity roosts they were raised in. After a few months they have reached their adult body size. The pups are born in summer (December–February in New Zealand). During this summer birthing period, the dispersed individuals will regroup, forming a large colony. Pups will feed first on milk produced by their mothers. Each mother will give birth to a single pup per season. The result of this is higher maternal investment per offspring, however the non-monogamous mating system results in low paternal investment. The pups are raised in special sections of the colony's roosting site dedicated to maternal activities. Other female bats will group at these maternal roosts and aid in the rearing of pups.

There are no records of the average lifespan of lesser short-tailed bats. Other bats within the suborder Yangochiroptera have been observed to live for upwards of thirty years, which is unexpected for their small body sizes. During spring/summer, male bats attract a female mate. These pairs will mate during autumn. During autumn and winter, the bats will disperse into smaller colony groups while the female bats are pregnant. Then, when it becomes summer again the bats regroup into a larger colony and the pups are born. Around autumntime, the pups have reached physical maturity. It is unclear at what age they reach sexual maturity.

== Human impacts and conservation ==
=== Threats ===
Currently, NZ lesser short-tailed bats are classified as Vulnerable by the IUCN, with the number of individuals observed as declining over time. The introduction of mammalian predators has had a massive impact on the species' numbers. Since the colonisation of New Zealand and the introduction of three key rat species the endemic bat populations have experienced a reduction in numbers. Polynesian rats (R. exulans) were one of the bat's main predators up until the 19th century, when the introduction of the black rat (R. rattus) and the brown rat (R. norvegicus) led to heavier predation. Before mammalian predators colonised New Zealand, the lesser short-tailed bat was preyed on by predatory birds, such as the laughing owl. Another common predator of these bats are common house cats, which will catch the bats as they fly out of their roosting sites. The bat roosts are very vulnerable, as they contain more potential prey within a single area. If these roosts were found by a predator, they could experience mass mortality events; in one incident, 102 lesser short-tailed bat deaths were caused by a single house cat in central North Island.

Department of Conservation New Zealand

Another cause for their decline is increased use of the land for anthropogenic activities, such as logging and agriculture. These activities can often result in negative consequences for the local ecosystem, such as forest fragmentation. For native animals in New Zealand, fragmentation poses threats such as reduced genetic diversity. However, it is possible that the lesser short-tailed bats will not be affected by forest fragmentation, as the species has been observed to show behavioural plasticity, through the ability to change/occupy different habitats.

=== Current conservation plans ===
The current state of conservation for lesser short-tailed bats is being managed by the New Zealand Department of Conservation (DOC). The recovery plan in place since the late 1990s involves a multi-pronged approach of different actions to take to prevent this species from further endangerment. Some of the detailed actions include creating new bat populations on the various predator-free islands around New Zealand, surveying the mainlands to identify areas that require extra conservation efforts, and potentially creating a captive population.
