= St Bathans mammal =

Extinct mammal of New Zealand

The St Bathans mammal is a currently unnamed extinct primitive mammal from the Early Miocene (Altonian, 18.7 Ma to 15.9 Ma) of New Zealand. A member of the St Bathans fauna, it is notable for being a late-surviving "archaic" mammal species, neither a placental nor a marsupial. It also provides evidence that flightless fully terrestrial mammals did in fact once live in Zealandia. This is in contrast to modern New Zealand, where bats, cetaceans and seals are the only non-introduced mammals in the otherwise bird-dominated faunas.

== Discovery ==
The St Bathans mammal is currently represented by three specimens in Te Papa: NMNZ S.40958, NMNZ S.41866, and NMNZ S.42214, composed of two lower jaw fragments and a femur respectively. It was part of an assemblage of fossils recovered in St Bathans in 1978, in what would later be understood to be the Bannockburn Formation (Manuherikia Group), and first described in 2006.

== Description ==
Like most small mammal fossils, the St Bathans mammal material is rather incomplete, with only a lower jaw fragment and femur initially being reported. It was later suggested that the femur may belong to a bat. In 2024, it was reported that additional elements had been recovered including a molar and a premolar tooth, additional mandible fragments, an undoubtedly non-bat femur shaft, as well as other postcranial remains, with it being suggested that at least two distinct species were present.

The lower jaws are toothless, though the presence of deep tooth sockets suggests that they were toothed in life and that the teeth were lost post-mortem. They bear a long fused mandibular symphysis, an evidently procumbent lower incisor, and five additional sockets that imply a dental formula of one incisor, one canine and two double-rooted premolars.

The femur possesses a round head and poorly defined neck, oriented slightly dorsomedially with respect to the long axis of the shaft, and separated from the greater trochanter by a marked trough. The alignment of the femur in life is hard to ascertain, but it is thought that the animal had a semi-sprawling stance, more abducted than in therian mammals but nowhere near as much as in monotremes.

== Phylogeny ==
Because of the incomplete material, it is very hard to understand the position of this taxon within Mammaliaformes as a whole. Worthy et al. 2006 tentatively deemed the St Bathans mammal as a theriiform, being more derived than morganucodontans, eutriconodonts and monotremes but not as much as multituberculates, on the basis of its femoral anatomy. As the phylogeny of non-therian mammals has undergone multiple shifts since its description, new studies might be necessary.

== Ecology ==
The Bannockburn Formation depicts a warm temperate or subtropical lakeside environment, surrounded by herbaceous peat–swamps. Casuarinas, araucarias, podocarps, eucalypts, palm trees and southern beeches are among the various plant species known to have grown here. As today, the local vertebrate fauna was dominated by birds: early moas and adzebills are represented by unnamed species, as are various representatives of groups such as waterfowl, flamingos, rails, herons, strigopoidean parrots and even an early kiwi, Proapteryx. However, unlike modern New Zealand it also had a varied herpetofauna: besides an early tuatara, the St Bathans fauna also includes meiolaniid and pleurodire turtles and possibly mekosuchine crocodylids and snakes.

Besides the St Bathans mammal, this fauna also includes mystacine bats, a group still present in modern New Zealand. Like the modern species, these were probably terrestrial foragers, the same general ecological niche proposed for the St Bathans mammal. Other bats, including a vesper bat and several currently unclassified species, also existed.
