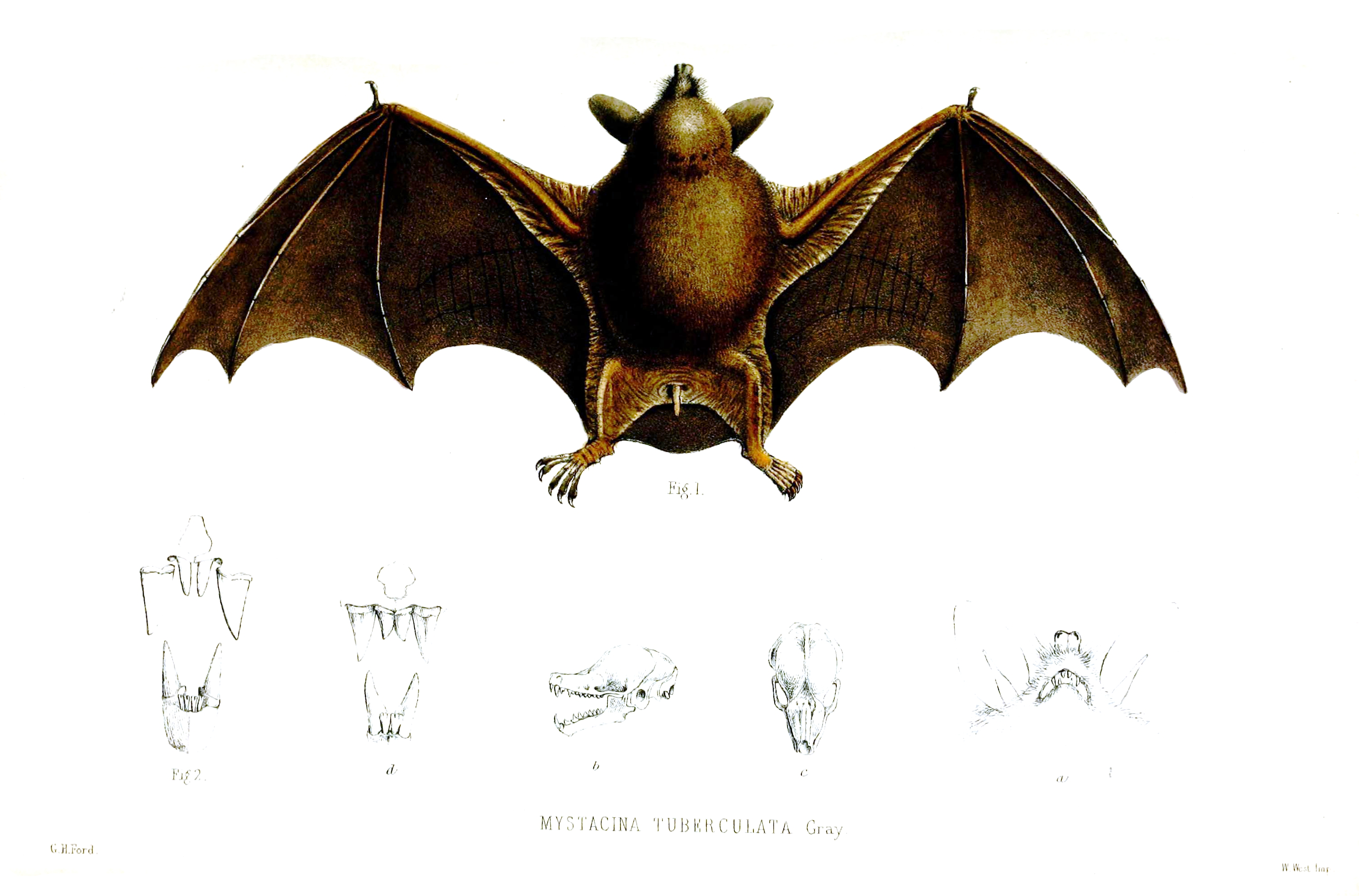
- New Zealand lesser short-tailed bat, (Mystacina tuberculata)

Scientific classification
- Kingdom: Animalia
- Phylum: Chordata
- Class: Mammalia
- Order: Chiroptera
- Family: Mystacinidae
- Genus: Mystacina; Gray in Dieffenbach, 1843

Type species
- Mystacina tuberculata Gray, 1843

Species
- M. tuberculata; †M. miocenalis; M. robusta

= Mystacina =

Mystacina Temporal range: Miocene – Recent 19–recent Ma

Genus of bats

Mystacina is the sole surviving genus of the Mystacinidae family of bats. It has three known species, of which only the New Zealand lesser short-tailed bat (Mystacina tuberculata) is confirmed to survive today. The closely related New Zealand greater short-tailed bat (Mystacina robusta) has not had a confirmed sighting since 1965 and is thought to be extinct. The third species, Mystacina miocenalis, is known from the Middle Miocene, some 19–16 million years ago.
