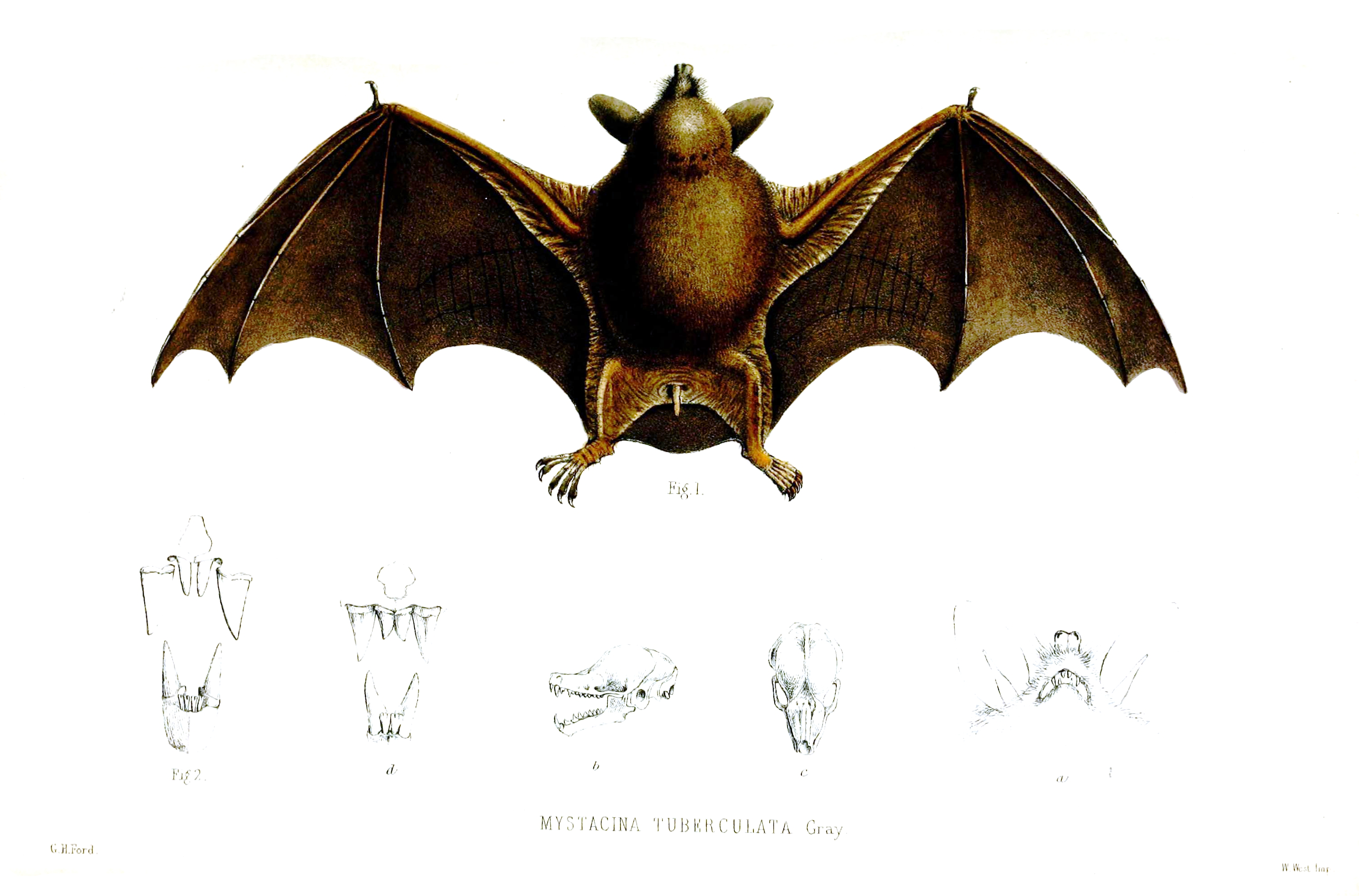
- New Zealand lesser short-tailed bat, Mystacina tuberculata

Scientific classification
- Kingdom: Animalia
- Phylum: Chordata
- Class: Mammalia
- Order: Chiroptera
- Superfamily: Noctilionoidea
- Family: Mystacinidae; Dobson, 1875

Genera
- Mystacina; †Icarops; †Vulcanops

= Mystacinidae =

Mystacina Temporal range: Late Oligocene - Recent

Family of bats

Mystacinidae is a family of unusual bats, the New Zealand short-tailed bats. There is one living genus, Mystacina, with two species, one of which could have possibly become extinct in the 1960s. They are medium-sized bats, about 6 centimetres (2.4 in) in length, with grey, velvety fur.

== Species and range ==
The origins of this family go back to the Late Oligocene of Australia, with the genus Icarops. Several fossil species are also known from the contemporary Saint Bathans Fauna in New Zealand. The oldest unambiguous fossils of the living genus date to the Miocene of New Zealand. A second extinct genus, Vulcanops, lived sympatrically with Mystacina in New Zealand from the Miocene until its extinction during the Pleistocene. The study describing Vulcanops also renders Icarops paraphyletic in regards to the rest of the family.

Mystacines appear to have been an old Gondwanan lineage; they diverged from other bat groups within Noctilionoidea (a primarily Gondwanan group otherwise including Noctilionidae, Phyllostomidae and Mormoopidae) around 51-41 million years ago.

== Description ==
Mystacinids have some unusual characteristics compared to other bats. They spend much of the time on the ground, instead of flying, and are unique in having the ability to fold their wings into a leathery membrane when not in use. Another distinctive feature of the group is an additional projection on some of the claws, which may aid in digging or climbing. They are omnivorous, eating fruit and carrion in addition to ground-dwelling arthropods. They also eat pollen and nectar, which they are able to collect with their extensible tongues. They sometimes chew out burrows in rotting wood, but can also roost in rock crevices or the burrows of seabirds.

Many old sources refer to the terrestriality of these bats as a trait acquired due to island endemism, assumed to have evolved due to the absence of terrestrial mammals in New Zealand. However, Icarops, a mainland Australian genus, shows adaptations to terrestriality, suggesting that it evolved prior to the colonisation of New Zealand, in an environment dominated by terrestrial mammals such as marsupials and monotremes. Furthermore, the Saint Bathans fossil species co-existed with the Saint Bathans mammal, suggesting that New Zealand wasn't devoid of land mammals when these bats first arrived.

They give birth once each summer, to a single young. They are able to hibernate during the winter.

In 2010 the Department of Conservation discovered a feral cat that was responsible for killing over 100 short-tailed bats over a seven-day period in a forested area on the southern slope of Mount Ruapehu.
