= Geology of Zealandia =

Geology of continental crust containing New Zealand and New Caledonia

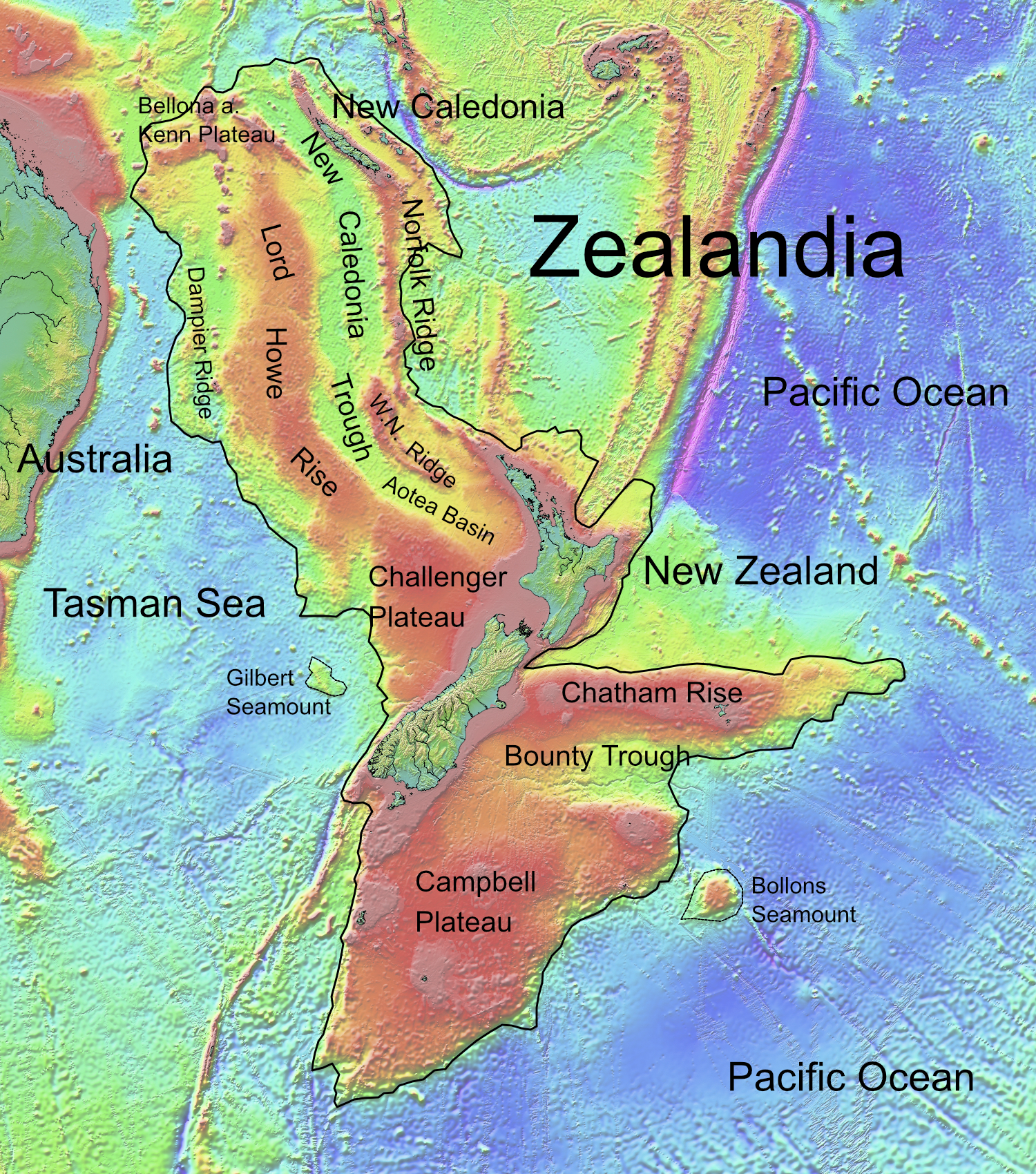
Topographic map of Zealandia.

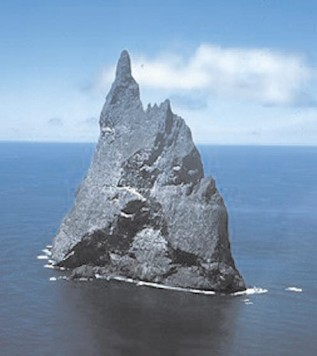
Most of Zealandia is underwater. Ball's Pyramid, near Lord Howe Island, is one place (other than New Zealand itself) where it rises above sea level.

See Zealandia (disambiguation) for other than Continent

Zealandia is an area of mostly submerged continental crust that contains New Zealand and New Caledonia.

== Geology ==
The Zealandia continent is largely made up of two nearly parallel ridges, separated by a failed rift, where the rift breakup of the continent stops and becomes a filled graben. The ridges rise above the sea floor to heights of 1,000–1,500 m (3,300–4,900 ft), with a few rocky islands rising above sea level. The ridges are continental rock, but are lower in elevation than normal continents because their crust is thinner than usual, approximately 20 km (12 mi) thick, and consequently, they do not float so high above Earth's mantle as that of most landmasses.

About 25 million years ago, the southern part of Zealandia (on the Pacific Plate) began to shift relative to the northern part (on the Indo-Australian Plate). The resulting displacement by approximately 500 km (310 mi) along the Alpine Fault is evident in geological maps. Movement along this plate boundary also has offset the New Caledonia Basin from its previous continuation through the Bounty Trough.

Compression across the boundary has uplifted the Southern Alps, although due to rapid erosion their height reflects only a small fraction of the uplift. Farther north, subduction of the Pacific Plate has led to extensive volcanism, including the Coromandel and Taupō Volcanic Zones. Associated rifting and subsidence has produced the Hauraki Rift and more recently, the Whakatane Graben and Wanganui Basin.

=== Volcanism ===
Volcanism on Zealandia has taken place repeatedly in various parts of the continental fragment before, during, and after it rifted away from the supercontinent Gondwana. Although Zealandia has shifted approximately 6,000 km (3,700 mi) to the northwest with respect to the underlying mantle from the time when it rifted from Antarctica, recurring intracontinental volcanism exhibits magma composition similar to that of volcanoes in previously adjacent parts of Antarctica and Australia. Large volume magmatism occurred in two periods, being in the Devonian (370 to 368 million years ago) and the Early Cretaceous (129 to 105 million years ago).

This volcanism is widespread across Zealandia, but on present land generally it is of low volume apart from the huge mid to late Miocene shield volcanoes that developed the Banks and Otago Peninsulas. In addition, it took place continually in numerous limited regions all through the Late Cretaceous and the Cenozoic. Some of its causes remain in dispute perhaps because of data gaps. During the Miocene, the northern section of Zealandia (Lord Howe Rise) might have slid over a stationary hotspot, forming the Lord Howe Seamount Chain.

It has been suggested that Zealandia may have played an important part in the origin of the Pacific Ocean's volcanic Ring of Fire.

=== Geological subdivisions ===
Occasionally, Zealandia is divided into two regions by scientists: North Zealandia (or Western Province); and South Zealandia (or Eastern Province), the latter of which contains most of the Median Batholith crust. These two features are separated by the Alpine Fault and Kermadec Trench and by the wedge-shaped Hikurangi Plateau, and they are moving separately from each other.

=== Classification as a continent ===
The case for Zealandia being a continent in its own right has been argued in the Nick Mortimer and Hamish Campbell book Zealandia: Our continent revealed (2014), in which the authors presented geological and ecological evidence in support of their thesis.

In 2017, a team of eleven geologists from New Zealand, New Caledonia, and Australia concluded that Zealandia fulfills all the requirements to be considered a submerged continent, rather than a microcontinent or continental fragment. This verdict was widely covered in the news media.

=== Oldest parent rocks ===
The younger Zealandia rocks have evidence of origins from early Gondwana formations of 500 to 700 million years ago, Rodinia formations about a billion years ago and sources from an expanded-Ur continent between 3.5 and 2 billion years ago.

=== Tectonics ===
The breakup of Gondwana formed Northern Zealandia. Zealandia underwent extension resulting from east to northeast-directed rollback of west to southwest-dipping subduction of the Pacific Plate, which terminated between 95 million to 85 million years ago. After 85 million years ago Zealandia separated from Australia through seafloor spreading of the Coral and Tasman seas until this ceased 52 million years ago. Shortening on an active convergent northern margin of Zealandia occurred mainly between 45 and 35 million years ago. This was followed by the opening of the backarc basins of the southwest Pacific and the migration of the Tonga and Kermadec Trenchs to the east. Shear extrusion followed between 23.3 million to 5 million years ago with the New Zealand Alpine Fault rupture and a southwestward extension of the Campbell Plateau relative to the Challenger Plateau. Southeast Indian Ocean Ridge expansion movement completely separated Zealandia from the Antarctic at about 10 million years ago. In the last 5 million years Zealandia has been generally subsiding owing to the Pacific Plate subducting westward and retreating eastward.

== Attribution History ==
Copied content for back inclusion from Zealandia; see that page's history for attribution.
