= Natural history of New Zealand =

The natural history of New Zealand began when the landmass Zealandia – today an almost entirely submerged mass of continental crust with New Zealand and a few other islands peaking above sea level – broke away from the supercontinent Gondwana in the Cretaceous period. Before this time, Zealandia shared its past with Australia and Antarctica. Since this separation, the New Zealand landscape has evolved in physical isolation, although much of its current biota has more recent connections with species on other landmasses. The exclusively natural history of the country ended in about 1300 AD, when humans first settled there, and the country's environmental history began. The period from 1300 AD to today coincides with the extinction of many of New Zealand's unique species that had evolved there.

The break-up of Gondwana left the resulting continents, including Zealandia, with a shared ecology. Zealandia began to move away from the part of Gondwana which would become Australia and Antarctica approximately 85 million years ago (Ma). By about 70 Ma, the break up was complete. Zealandia has been moving northwards ever since, changing both in relief and climate. Most of the present biota of New Zealand has post-Gondwanan connections to species on other landmasses, but does include a few descendants of Gondwanan lineages, such as the Saint Bathans mammal. Overall, trans-oceanic dispersal has played a clear role in the formation of New Zealand's biota. Several elements of the Gondwana biota are present in New Zealand today: predominantly plants, such as the podocarps and the southern beeches, but also distinctive insects, birds, frogs and the tuatara.

In the Duntroonian stage of the Oligocene, the land area of Zealandia was at a minimum. It has been suggested that water covered all of it, but the consensus is that low-lying islands remained, perhaps a quarter of the modern land area of New Zealand.

== Before the split (Gondwana, 85 million years ago) ==
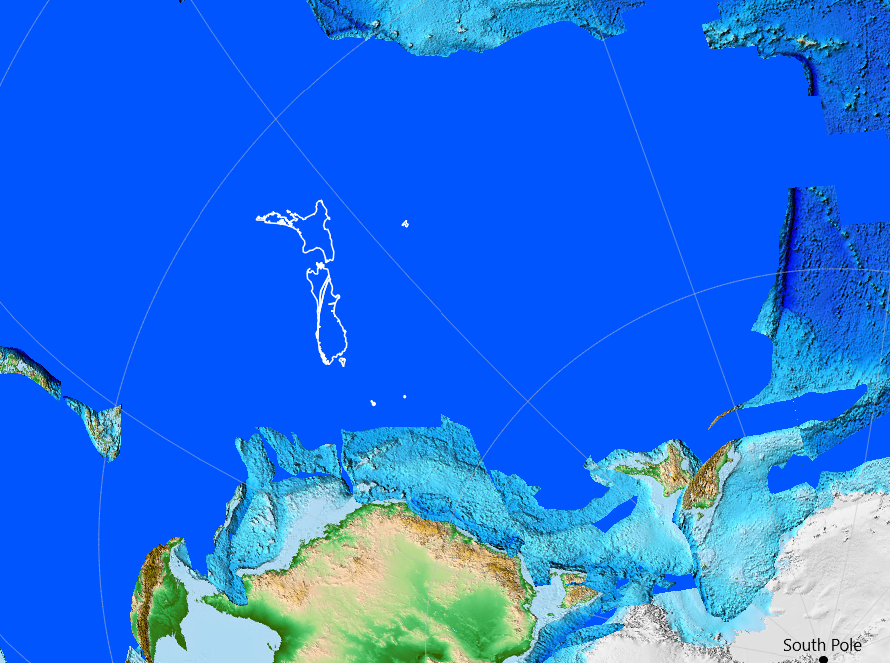
Zealandia (lower right, portions of New Zealand's present North and South Islands visible above sea level), between Australia and Antarctica near the South Pole, 90 million years ago. The present position of New Zealand is outlined in white (centre left).

In the late Cretaceous, Gondwana was a fraction of its original size, however, the landmasses that would become Australia, Antarctica and Zealandia were still attached. Most of the modern 'Gondwanan fauna' had its origin in the Cretaceous. During this time Zealandia was temperate and almost flat, with no alpine environments.

=== Gondwanan fauna ===
Fossils found at Lightning Ridge, New South Wales, suggest that 110 million years ago (Ma), Australia supported a number of different monotremes, but did not support any marsupials. Marsupials appear to have evolved during the Cretaceous in the contemporary northern hemisphere, to judge from a 100-million-year-old marsupial fossil, Kokopellia, found in the badlands of Utah. Marsupials would then have spread to South America and Gondwana. The first evidence of mammals (both marsupials and placental) in Australia comes from the Tertiary, and was found at a 55-million-year-old fossil site at Murgon, in southern Queensland. As Zealandia had rifted away at this time it explains the lack of ground-dwelling marsupials and placental mammals in New Zealand's fossil record.

Dinosaurs continued to prosper but, as the angiosperms diversified, conifers, bennettitaleans and pentoxylaleans disappeared from Gondwana c. 115 Ma together with the specialised herbivorous ornithischians, whilst generalist browsers, such as several families of sauropodomorph Saurischia, prevailed. The Cretaceous–Paleogene extinction event killed off all dinosaurs except birds, but plant evolution in Gondwana was hardly affected. Gondwanatheria is an extinct group of non-therian mammals with a Gondwanan distribution (South America, Africa, Madagascar, India, and Antarctica) during the Late Cretaceous and Palaeogene. Xenarthra and Afrotheria, two placental clades, are of Gondwanan origin and probably began to evolve separately c. 105 Ma when Africa and South America separated.

=== Gondwanan flora ===
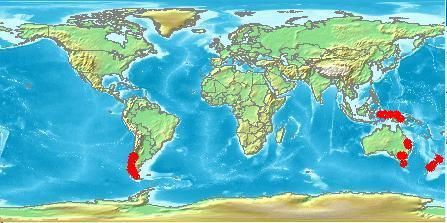
The plant genus Nothofagus provides a good example of a taxon with a Gondwanan distribution, having originated in the supercontinent and existing in present-day Australia, New Zealand, New Caledonia, and South America's Southern Cone

Angiosperms evolved in northern Gondwana/southern Laurasia during the Early Cretaceous and radiated worldwide. The southern beeches, Nothofagus, are prominent members of this early angiosperm flora. The Late Cretaceous pollen record shows that some types of flora evolved across Gondwana, while others originated in Antarctica and spread to Australia. Fossils of Nothofagus have also recently been found in Antarctica. The laurel forests of Australia, New Caledonia, and New Zealand have a number of species related to those of the laurissilva of Valdivia, through the connection of the Antarctic flora. These include gymnosperms and the deciduous species of Nothofagus, as well as the New Zealand laurel, Corynocarpus laevigatus, and Laurelia novae-zelandiae. At this time Zealandia was mostly covered in forests of podocarps, araucarian pines, and ferns.

== Rafting away (latest Cretaceous 85–66 Ma) ==
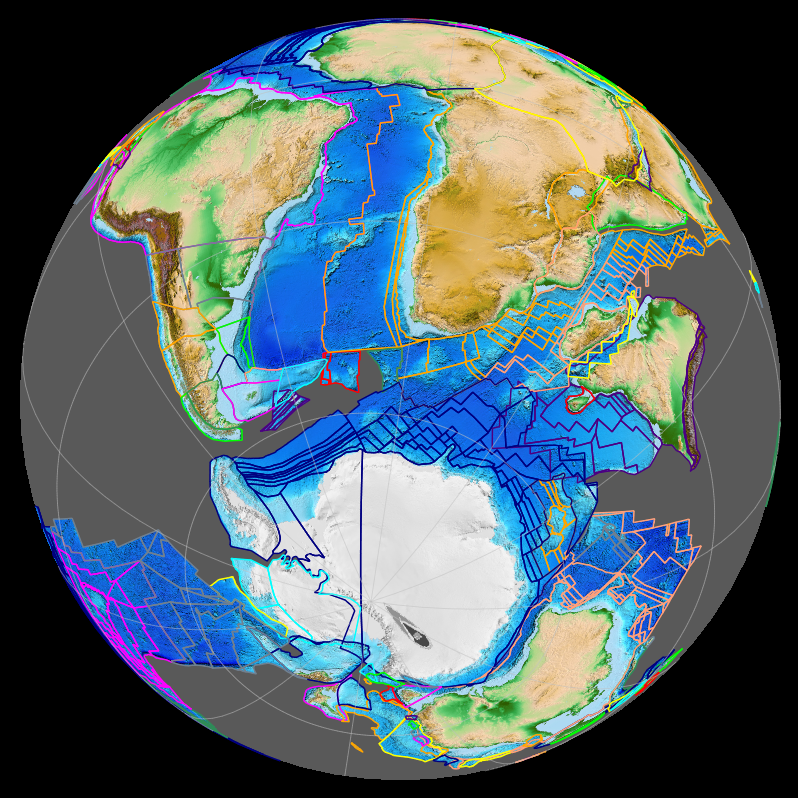
The remains of Gondwana 83 Ma, with Zealandia lower left

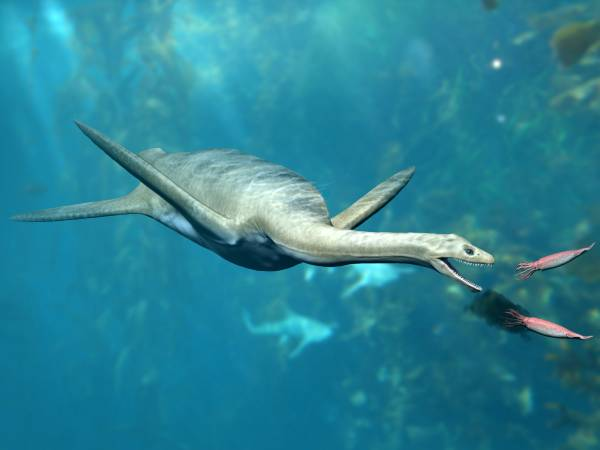
Plesiosaur (Kaiwhekea), is 7 metres long and lived around 70–69 million years ago in the seas around Zealandia.

The Australia-New Zealand continental part of Gondwana split from Antarctica in the late Cretaceous (95–90 Ma). This was followed by Zealandia separating from Australia (c.85 Ma). The split started from the Southern end and eventually formed the Tasman Sea. By about 70 Ma, the continental crust of Zealandia separated from Australia and Antarctica. However, it is not known when the division of land above sea level occurred, and for some time only shallow seas would have separated Zealandia and Australia in the north. Dinosaurs continued to live in New Zealand and had about 10–20 million years to evolve unique species after they separated from Gondwana.

In the Cretaceous, New Zealand was much further south (c.80 degrees south) than it is today, however, it and much of Antarctica was covered in trees as the climate of 90 Ma was much warmer and wetter than today.

New Zealand's present native fauna does not contain land mammals (other than bats) or snakes. Neither marsupials nor placental mammals evolved in time to reach Australia before the split. The multituberculates, a primitive type of mammal, may have evolved in time to cross New Zealand using the land bridge. The evolution and dispersal of snakes is less certain, due to their poor fossil record, it is uncertain as to whether they were in Australia before the opening of the Tasman Sea. Ratites evolved around c. 80 ma and may have been present in Zealandia at this time.

Based on fossils unearthed from the Tahora Formation, dinosaurs endemic to New Zealand would have included parankylosaurs, elasmarian ornithopods, titanosaurs, and theropods. Azhdarchid pterosaurs were also endemic to New Zealand.

== Swamps and rifting (Paleocene to Eocene 66 to 33.9 Ma) ==
At the start of the Paleocene New Zealand's biota was recovering from the extinction of dinosaurs, and the species that survived were expanding into the empty niches. There was a slight decrease in mean temperature at the start of the Paleocene, leading to a change in canopy species. Zealandia was largely covered by shallow seas with low-lying land and swamps. The oldest penguin fossil in the world and various other sea birds are found in New Zealand from this time.

The Tasman Sea continued to expand until the early Eocene (53 Ma). The western half of Zealandia then along with Australia formed the Australian Plate (40 Ma). In response to this, a new plate boundary was created within Zealandia between the Australian Plate and Pacific Plate. This led to the formation of a subduction arc with active volcanism forming islands north and west of present New Zealand. New Zealand was low lying due to this extension and swamps became widespread. Today these are recorded as large coal seams in the geological record.

The isolation of Antarctica and the formation of the Antarctic Circumpolar Current is credited by many researchers with causing the glaciation of Antarctica and global cooling in the Eocene epoch. Oceanic models have shown that the opening of these two passages limited polar heat convergence and caused a cooling of sea surface temperatures by several degrees; other models have shown that CO_{2} levels also played a significant role in the glaciation of Antarctica. Published estimates of the onset of the Antarctic Circumpolar Current vary, but it is commonly considered to have started at the Eocene/Oligocene boundary.

Whales were completely marine creatures by 40 Ma; New Zealand oldest whale fossils are from 35 Ma.

== New Zealand's shallow seas (Oligocene 33.9 to 23 Ma) ==
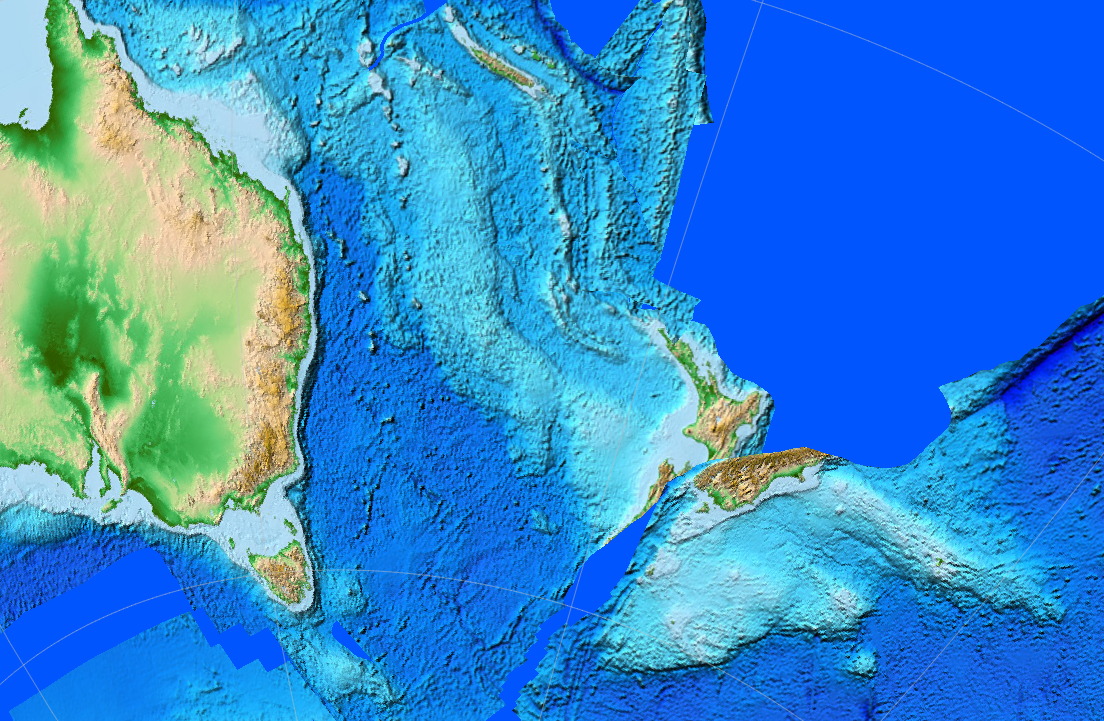
New Zealand before the activation of the Alpine Fault (30 Ma)

From the early Oligocene, at maximum submersion of the Zealandia landmass, almost all New Zealand's rocks are marine. Oligocene terrestrial sediments are few, scattered, and not well-dated.

It has been suggested that at some point, Zealandia was entirely underwater, and consequently all land biota would be descended from later immigrants. However, molecular estimates of divergence times between 248 extant New Zealand lineages and their closest relatives elsewhere follow approximately a smooth exponential over the last 50 million years or more. Some 74 of these lineages appear to have survived the Oligocene in New Zealand. There is no evidence for a deficit of pre-Oligocene lineages, nor an excess of lineages arriving just afterward. This strongly suggests that New Zealand was never submerged completely. Although there is no obvious peak of lineage extinction in the Oligocene, the limited diversity of mitochondrial DNA in kiwis, moas, and New Zealand wrens indicate that all three lineages underwent a genetic bottleneck (small effective populations) roughly coinciding with the maximum submersion; New Zealand at this time probably consisted of low-lying islands with a limited diversity of habitats.

Significant uplift occurred by the mid-Oligocene (~32–29 Ma) in the modern Canterbury Basin, where palaeochannels eroded through the early Oligocene Amuri Limestone lead eastwards to the present Bounty Trough.

The North and South island have been separate for most of the last 30 million years, allowing for the development of separate subspecies.

== The Southern Alps, Foulden Maar and Saint Bathans Fauna (Miocene – Pliocene 23 to 2.6 Ma) ==
Major uplift occurred on the Alpine Fault, which started to form the hills and the mountains that became the Southern Alps.

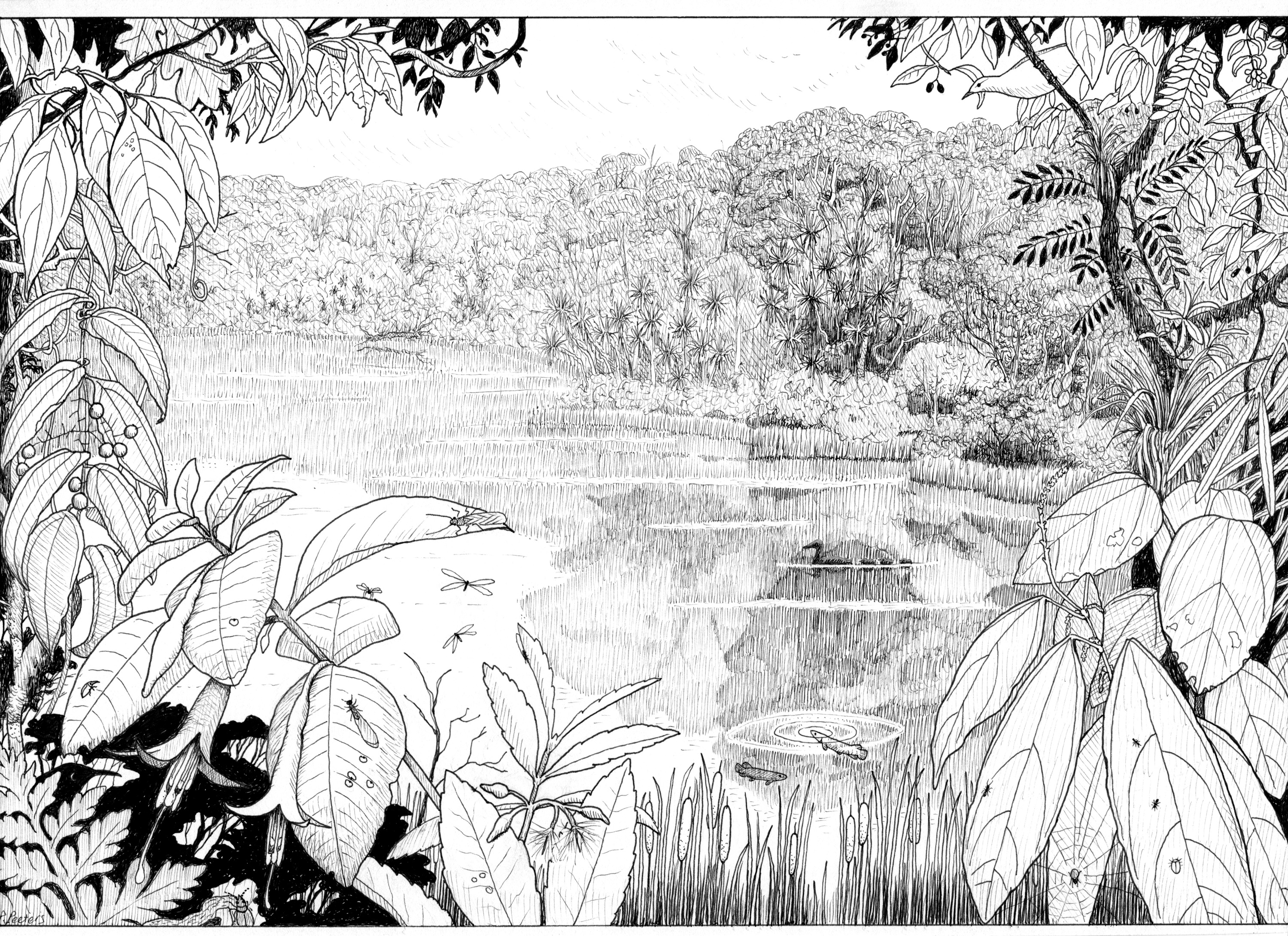
This reconstruction of the lake at Foulden Maar 23 million years ago was commissioned by palaeontologist Daphne Lee and drawn by artist/ecologist Paula Peeters.

Foulden Maar, a maar-diatreme volcano in Otago, preserved a high diversity of freshwater fish, arthropods, plants and fungi at a lake 23 Ma. It is the only known maar of its kind in the Southern Hemisphere and is one of New Zealand's pre-eminent fossil sites. The fossil evidence derived from pollen and spores suggests a warm temperate or sub-tropical rain forest with canopy trees, with an understorey of shrubs, ferns and on the margins pioneer species. Climatically, the area resembled modern-day south-eastern Queensland, a humid sub-tropical zone with species that no longer occur in the New Zealand flora. The lake contained small and large galaxiid fishes and eels, ducks (inferred from coprolites), and likely crocodiles as well.

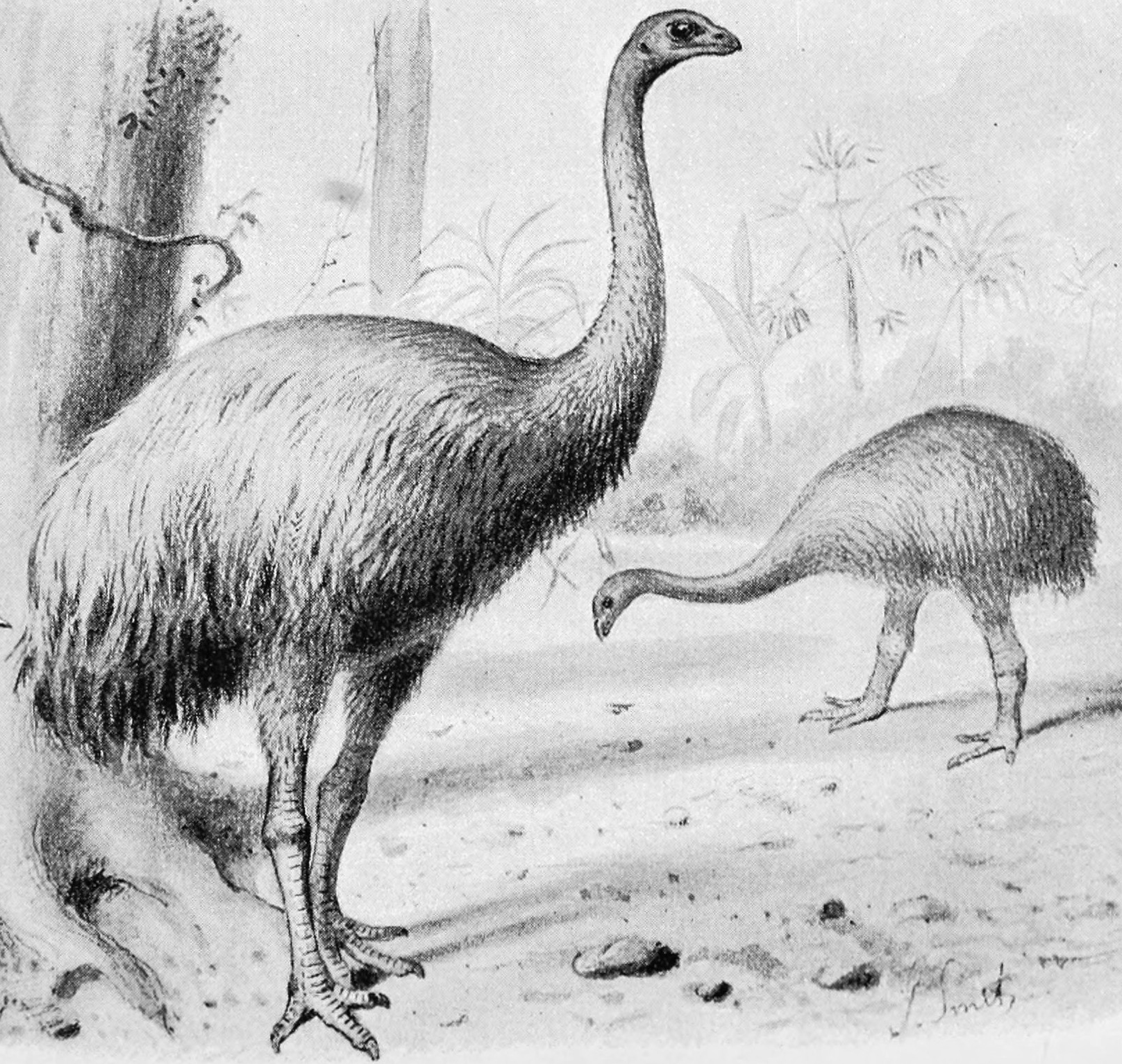
A restoration of Dinornis robustus (the moa), and Pachyornis elephantopus, both from the South Island

The Saint Bathans Fauna represents a detailed record of New Zealand's terrestrial life in the Miocene. It shows that small land mammals and crocodiles existed and have since become extinct. The earliest moa remains come from the Miocene Saint Bathans Fauna. Known from multiple eggshells and hindlimb elements, these represent at least two already fairly large sized species.

The boundaries defining the Pliocene are not set at an easily identified worldwide event but rather at regional boundaries between the warmer Miocene and the relatively cooler Pliocene. The upper boundary was set at the start of the Pleistocene glaciations. Uplift intensified on the Alpine Fault forming the Southern Alps. This global cooling coupled with an increase in elevation led to the local extinction of many groups of plants, which are now still found in New Caledonia. The new niches created in the mountains were filled with migrants from Australia and species that could evolve quickly.

== The Taupō Volcanic Zone and ice age (Pleistocene - Holocene 2.6 Ma to today) ==
Lake Taupo eruption, 186 AD

The ice age began 2.6 Ma, at the start of the Pleistocene epoch, and is defined by the presence of ice sheets on Greenland and Antarctica. During the warmer periods sea level was higher than today leading to raised beaches around New Zealand. New Zealand's flora is still recovering from the last glacial maximum. About 2 Ma, extension and subduction under the North Island formed the Taupō Volcanic Zone, leading to the central North Island being covered in cobalt deficient soils which restrict forest development. One of the largest eruptions was the Lake Taupo eruption of 186 AD.

Since the last glacial maximum there have been three major climatic periods: the coldest period from 28–18,000 years ago, an intermediate period from 18-11,000 years ago and our current climatic condition the warmer Holocene Inter Glacial over the last 11,000 years. In the first period global sea levels were about 130 metres (430 feet) lower than today. This made most of New Zealand a single island and exposed great sections of the currently submerged continental shelf. Temperatures were about 4–5 °C lower than today. Much of the Southern Alps and Fiordland were glaciated and much of the rest of New Zealand was covered in grass or shrubs, due to the cold and dry climate. These vast tracks of exposed land with little vegetation cover increased wind erosion and the deposition of loess (windblown dust). This deforestation led to a reduction in the forest cover and many canopy species were restricted to the northern areas of the country. The kauri was at the time only present in Northland but has progressively moved south from there over the last 7000 years, reaching its current limit about 2000 years ago.

== See also ==
- Environment of New Zealand
- Geology of New Zealand

== Sources ==
- Anderson, J. M.; Anderson, H. M.; Archangelsky, S.; Bamford, M.; Chandra, S.; Dettmann, M.; Hill, R.; McLoughlin, S.; Rösler, O. (1999). "Patterns of Gondwana plant colonisation and diversification". Journal of African Earth Sciences. 28 (1): 145–167. Bibcode:1999JAfES..28..145A. doi:10.1016/S0899-5362(98)00083-9.
- Campbell, Hamish; Hutching, Gerard (2011). In Search of Ancient New Zealand. Penguin Group New Zealand, Limited. ISBN 9780143206170.
- Gibbs, George W. (2007). Ghosts of Gondwana: The History of Life in New Zealand. Potton & Burton. ISBN 9780947503086.
- Graham, I. J. (2015). A Continent on the Move: New Zealand Geoscience Revealed. Geoscience Society of New Zealand. ISBN 9781877480478.
- Gurovich, Y.; Beck, R. (2009). "The phylogenetic affinities of the enigmatic mammalian clade Gondwanatheria". Journal of Mammalian Evolution. 16 (1): 25–49. doi:10.1007/s10914-008-9097-3. S2CID 42799370.
- Woodburne, M. O.; Rich, T. H.; Springer, M. S. (2003). "The evolution of tribospheny and the antiquity of mammalian clades". Molecular Phylogenetics and Evolution. 28 (2): 360–385. Bibcode:2003MolPE..28..360W. doi:10.1016/S1055-7903(03)00113-1. PMID 12878472.
