= Alexander Rogers =

Alexander Rogers may refer to:

- Alexander Rogers (sport shooter)
- Alexander Rogers (Canadian politician)
- Alexander Rogers (Australian politician)

== See also ==
- Alex Rogers (disambiguation)
- Rogers Alexander, American football player
