= Alex Rogers =

Alex Rogers may refer to:

- Alex Rogers (rugby union) (born 1986), rugby union player
- Alex Rogers (biologist), professor of conservation biology
- Alex Rogers (songwriter) (1876–1930), composer
