= Ocean Census Bounty Trough research expedition =

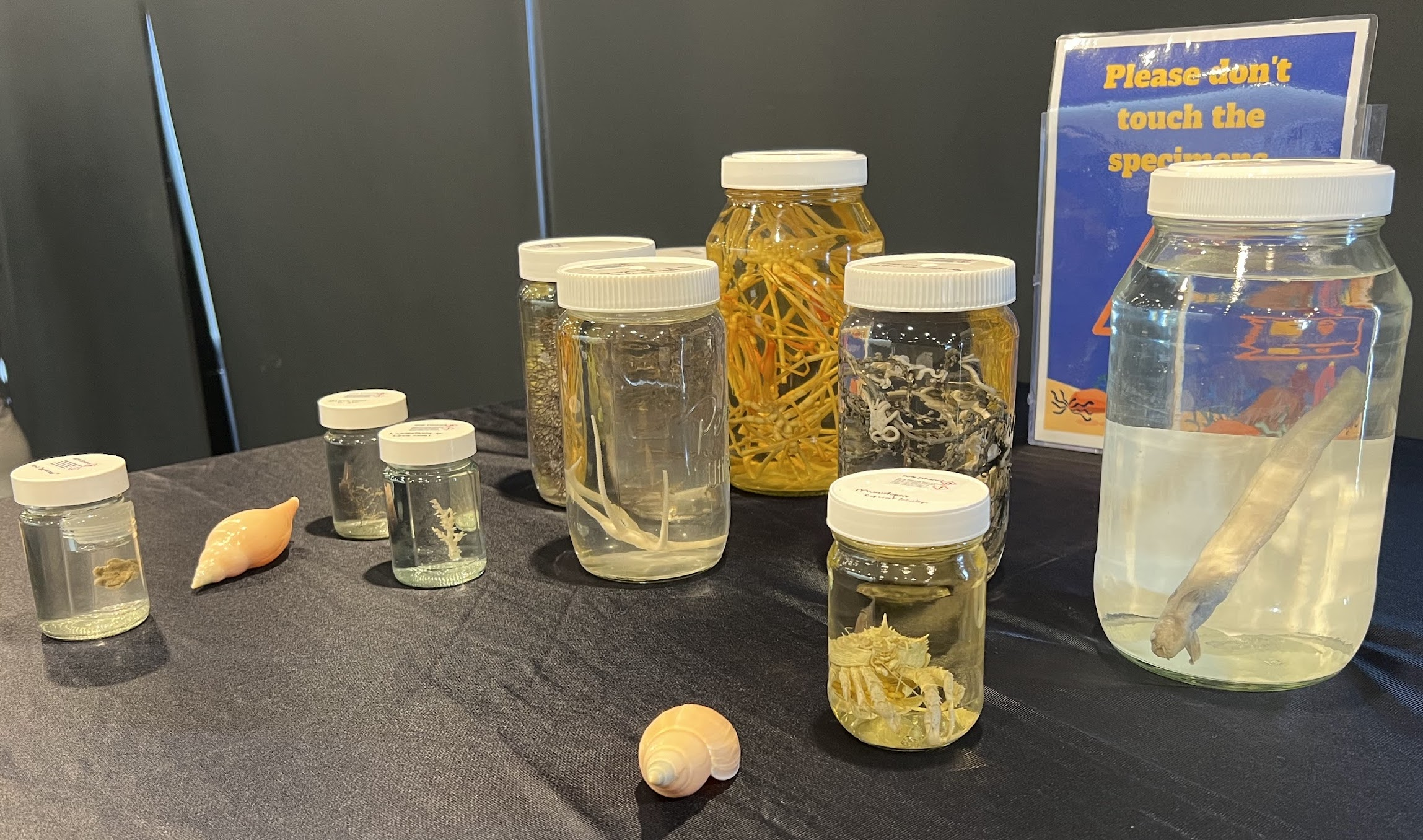
- Country: New Zealand
- Location: Bounty Trough
- Country of origin: New Zealand
- Start: Wellington; 8 February 2024
- Goal: deep-sea exploration
- Leader: Sadie Mills; Alex Rogers
- Affiliation: National Institute of Water and Atmospheric Research; Te Papa; Nippon Foundation-Nekton Ocean Census
- Vessels: RV Tangaroa
- Participants: Sadie Mills; Kerry Walton; Alex Rogers; Thomas D. Linley; Andrew L. Stewart

The Ocean Census Bounty Trough research expedition was a research expedition undertaken in 2024 and organised by Ocean Census, along with scientists from the National Institute of Water and Atmospheric Research and Te Papa, to research the biodiversity of the Bounty Trough.

Sadie Mills and Alex Rogers were the co-leaders of the expedition. Experts from the United Kingdom and Australia were also included.

The expedition gathered about 1800 samples and discovered over 100 new ocean species including maybe three new species of fish.
