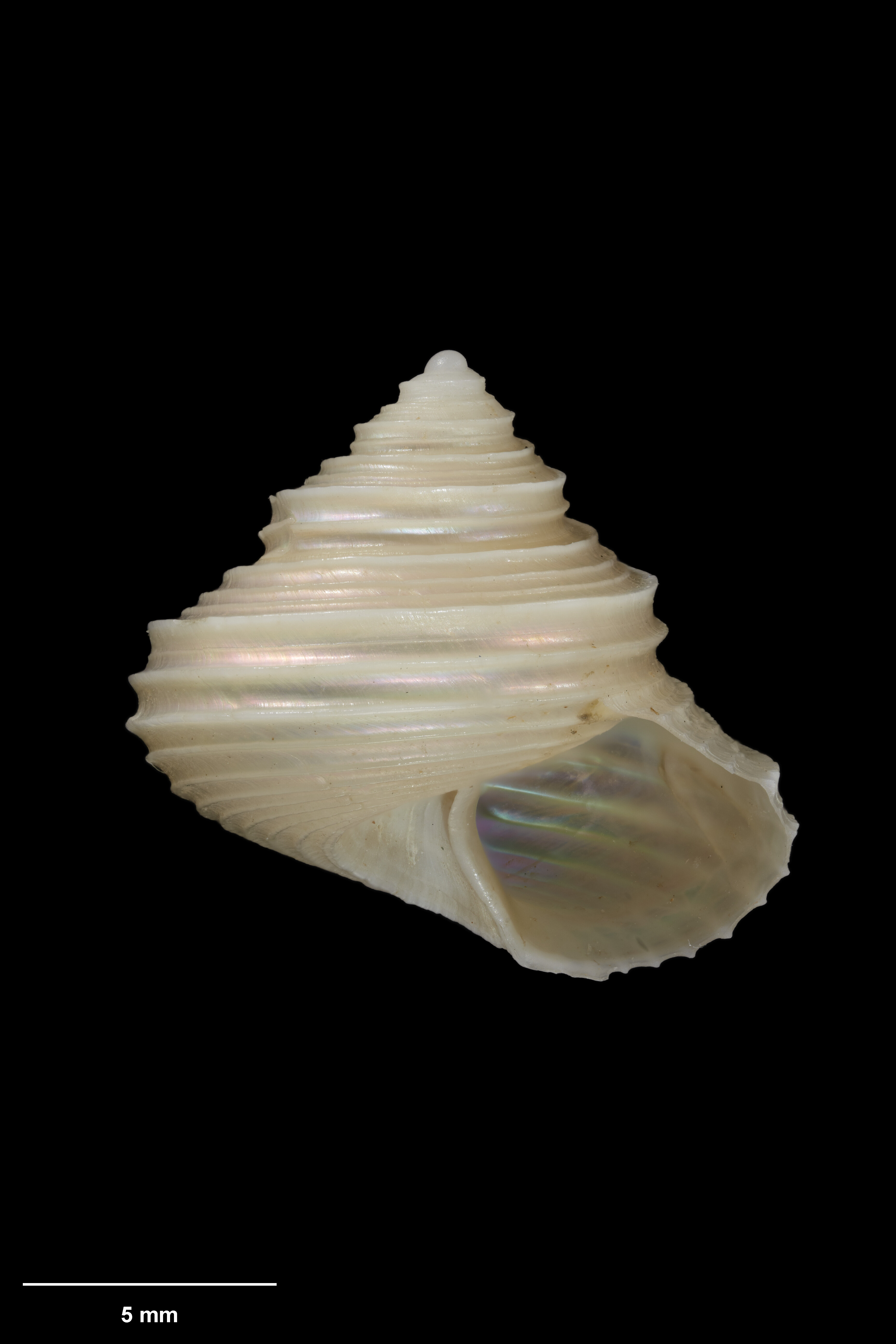
- Specimen collected during the Ocean Census Bounty Trough expedition

Scientific classification
- Kingdom: Animalia
- Phylum: Mollusca
- Class: Gastropoda
- Subclass: Vetigastropoda
- Order: Trochida
- Superfamily: Trochoidea
- Family: Calliostomatidae
- Genus: Falsimargarita
- Species: F. callista

Binomial name
- Falsimargarita callista B. A. Marshall, 2016

= Falsimargarita callista =

Species of gastropod

Falsimargarita callista is a species of sea snail, a marine gastropod mollusk, in the family Calliostomatidae within the superfamily Trochoidea, the top snails, turban snails and their allies.

== Distribution ==
This species occurs in New Zealand Exclusive Economic Zone.

== Cataloguing milestone ==
In 2024 a specimen of this species, collected during the Ocean Census Bounty Trough expedition, became the 1 millionth item to have a catalogue record published by Te Papa on its catalogue online website.

== See also ==
- Calliostomatidae
- Trochoidea (superfamily)
- Sea snail
- Ocean Census Bounty Trough research expedition
- Te Papa
