= Daphne Lee =

New Zealand geologist and palaeontologist

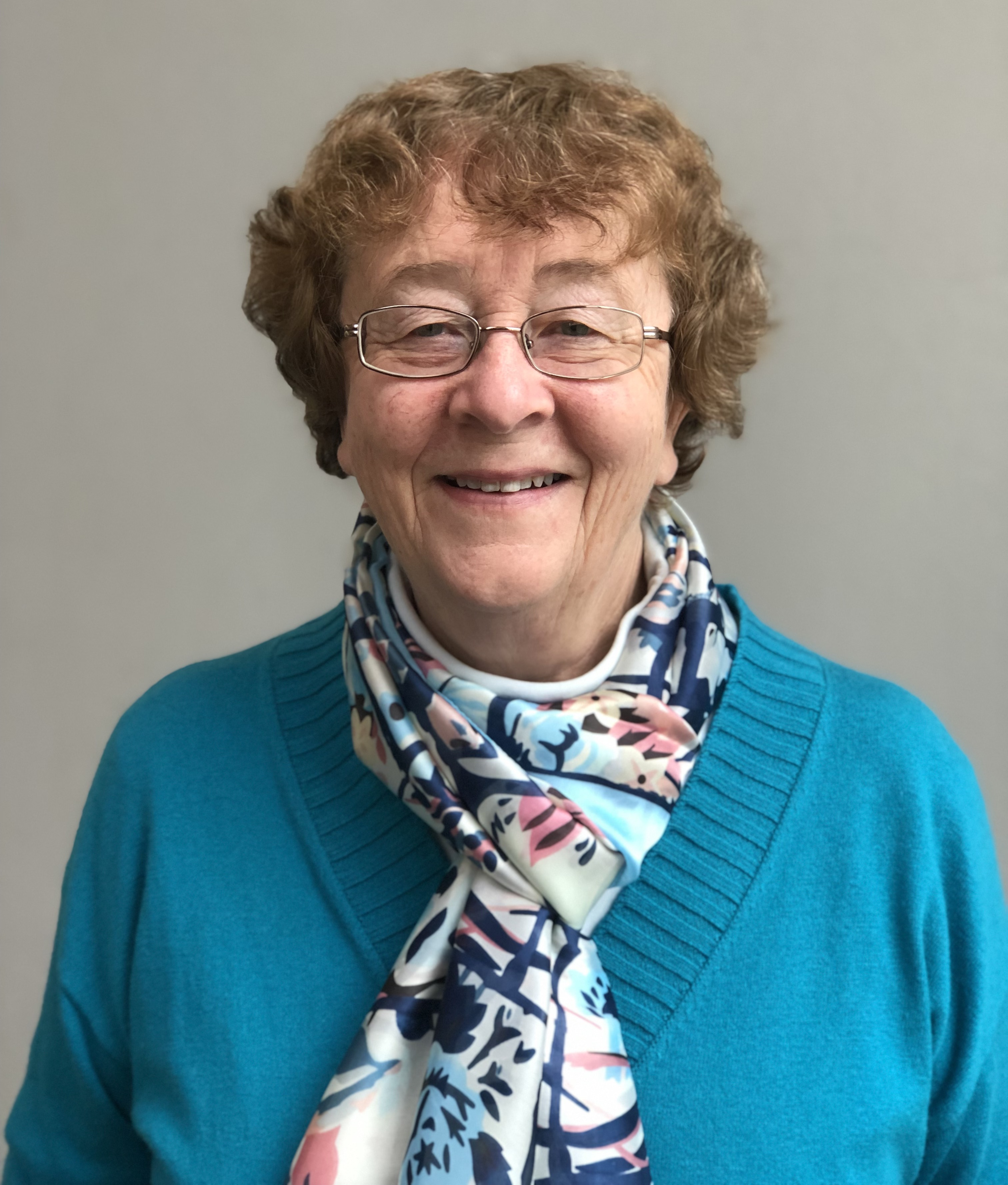
- Born: 1950
- Education: Doctor of Philosophy, Bachelor of Science
- Alma mater: University of Otago
- Awards: McKay Hammer Award (2017)
- Academic career
- Institutions: University of Otago
- Notable students: Henry James Leonard Gard
- Author abbrev. (botany): D.E.Lee

Daphne E. Lee is a New Zealand geologist, palaeontologist and emeritus professor at the University of Otago. She is best known for her work on Foulden Maar and her research into fossils discovered at that site, and her work to improve geoscience education.

== Biography ==
Lee was brought up on a farm near the Mataura River in Southland, and attended Gore High School, where she was a member of the geology club. Lee studied geology at the University of Otago and went on to complete a PhD in 1981, studying part-time while she had a family. Her dissertation was titled The Cenozoic and Recent rhynchonellide brachiopods of New Zealand, with an account of the Eocene and Paleocene brachiopod faunas. She joined the university in 1988, and was for many years the only woman faculty member in the Department of Geology. Lee’s research group was “the largest and most active university paleontological group” in New Zealand. Lee was an associate professor at the Geology Department of the University of Otago, from which she retired in 2018. In 2024 she was awarded the title emeritus professor, "in recognition of her outstanding career as one of New Zealand’s most prominent, dedicated and passionate paleontologists". She is a coordinator of a research team that has focused on researching the fossil site Foulden Maar. Lee is the curator of the University of Otago Geology Museum.

Lee led the GSNZ’s Geoeducation Subcommittee, which later became the Geological Education Special Interest Group. She co-founded the committee in 1983 and led it until 2005. The group created teaching materials and contributed to the national science curriculum for years 1–11, ensuring that earth science was included in the science curriculum in all schools. Lee specialises in palaeobotany and invertebrate paleontology, and is a recognised authority on living and fossil brachiopods.

== Foulden Maar ==
Lee has published both scholarly research as well as a book on the fossils of Foulden Maar. Lee was a vocal opponent of the proposed mining of Foulden Maar.

== Awards ==
Lee was awarded the Geoscience Society of New Zealand McKay Hammer Award in 2017. In November 2024, Lee was made an honorary life member of the Geoscience Society of New Zealand, with the citation noting her “significant contributions to the Society’s endeavours to improve geological education in New Zealand schools and her sustained support of GSNZ throughout her distinguished career.

== Selected publications ==
- Lee, Daphne (2022). Fossil treasures of Foulden Maar : a window into Miocene Zealandia. Uwe Kaulfuss, John Conran. Dunedin, New Zealand. ISBN 978-1-990048-35-7. OCLC 1311951204.
- Daniel B. Thomas; Jeffrey H. Robinson; Daphne Lee (3 June 2025), Fossil treasures of the Geology Museum, University of Otago, doi:10.11157/UO062025, Wikidata Q136263931
- Daphne E. Lee; Uwe Kaulfuss; John G. Conran; Jennifer M. Bannister; Jon K. Lindqvist (11 August 2016). "Biodiversity and palaeoecology of Foulden Maar: an early Miocene Konservat-Lagerstätte deposit in southern New Zealand". Alcheringa. 40 (4): 525–541. doi:10.1080/03115518.2016.1206321. ISSN 0311-5518. Wikidata Q58107192.
- DE Lee; JK Lindqvist; AG Beu; JH Robinson; MA Ayress; HEG Morgans; JK Stein (3 April 2014). "Geological setting and diverse fauna of a Late Oligocene rocky shore ecosystem, Cosy Dell, Southland". New Zealand Journal of Geology and Geophysics. 57 (2): 195–208. doi:10.1080/00288306.2014.898666. ISSN 0028-8306. Wikidata Q136522061.
- Daphne E. Lee; William G. Lee; Nick Mortimer (2001). "Where and why have all the flowers gone? Depletion and turnover in the New Zealand Cenozoic angiosperm flora in relation to palaeogeography and climate". Australian Journal of Botany. 49 (3): 341. doi:10.1071/BT00031. ISSN 0067-1924. Wikidata Q60243494.
