= Inverted Earth =

Earth where its bodies of water and landmasses are swapped

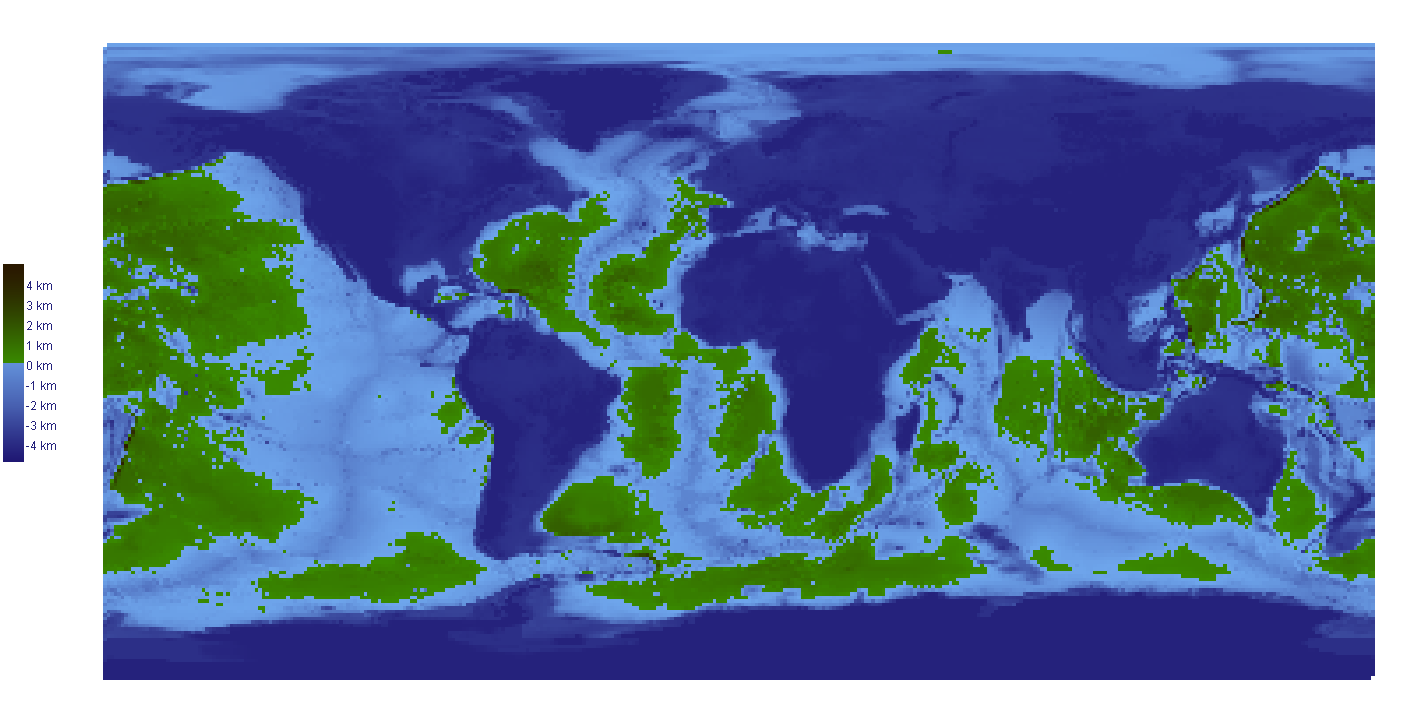
World map inverted by elevation, with the sea level reduced by 4,500m so that the volume of the oceans stays the same

Inverted Earth is an imaginative concept in which the Earth's landmasses and bodies of water are swapped, with landmasses becoming bodies of water and bodies of water becoming landmasses.

== Topography and climate ==
The current Earth comprises 29% land and 71% water, while Inverted Earth comprises 71% land and 29% water. Inverted Earth contains one vast, neverending landmass, allowing people to travel to any "ocean" on foot.

When inverting the Earth, lakes become islands, while rivers become long, narrow strips of land. The mountains on the real Earth would be underwater trenches on Inverted Earth and vice versa. One of the prominent geological features on Inverted Earth would be the Marianas mountain range, which would have the highest peak ("Challenger Peak" or "Mount Challenger") on Earth, even higher than Mount Everest. Likewise, the deepest point on Inverted Earth would be Everest Deep in the Himalayas Trench.

The climate on Inverted Earth would be much different than on the real Earth. Since its bodies of water would cover much less area, combined with tremendous distances between bodies of water, the amount of precipitation on Inverted Earth would be considerably less and deserts would cover much of the "land" area. Due to less precipitation, life would be more challenging to take hold.
