= Super-dense water =

Super-dense water is water that has been contained in an environment with both molecular uniformity and extreme depth, which causes the molecules of water to be packed tightly together and thus gain a tougher solidity and higher density than regular ice. Super dense water is found on planets, such as the moons Tethys, Ganymede, Callisto, and Europa in the Solar System, which are covered entirely in water and have little to no landmass.

== Speculation ==
Speculation exists that a planet located at around 30 light-years away from Earth may contain super-dense water. See ocean planet for more information on its formation.
