= Sadie Mills =

New Zealand marine biologist

- Born: Victoria Sadie Mills
- Citizenship: New Zealand
- Scientific career
- Fields: Marine biology and invertebrate collection manager
- Workplaces: National Institute of Water and Atmospheric Research

Victoria Sadie Mills is a New Zealand marine biologist and an invertebrate collection manager at New Zealand's National Institute of Water and Atmospheric Research. Mills specialises in the taxonomy of Ophiuroidea and has written a book titled Extraordinary echinoderms : a guide to the echinoderms of New Zealand.

== Early life and education ==
Mills grew up in the United Kingdom. She knew from a young age she wanted to be a marine biologist. Mills family moved to Dunedin in the South Island of New Zealand when she was a teenager, and she went on to study at Otago University.

Mills qualified with a Master in Science from Otago University in 2006. Her thesis is: Benthic macrofauna assemblages of fragmented seagrass (Zostera capricorni) beds in two southern New Zealand inlets.

== Career ==
Mills is a marine biologist. In 2006 Mills started work with National Institute of Water and Atmospheric Research Taihoro Nukurangi (NIWA) in Wellington. In 2014 she became Collections Manager of the NIWA Invertebrate Collection. This role heads a small team and is responsible for over 300,000 of preserved marine invertebrates specimens from around New Zealand, Antarctica and the South West Pacific.

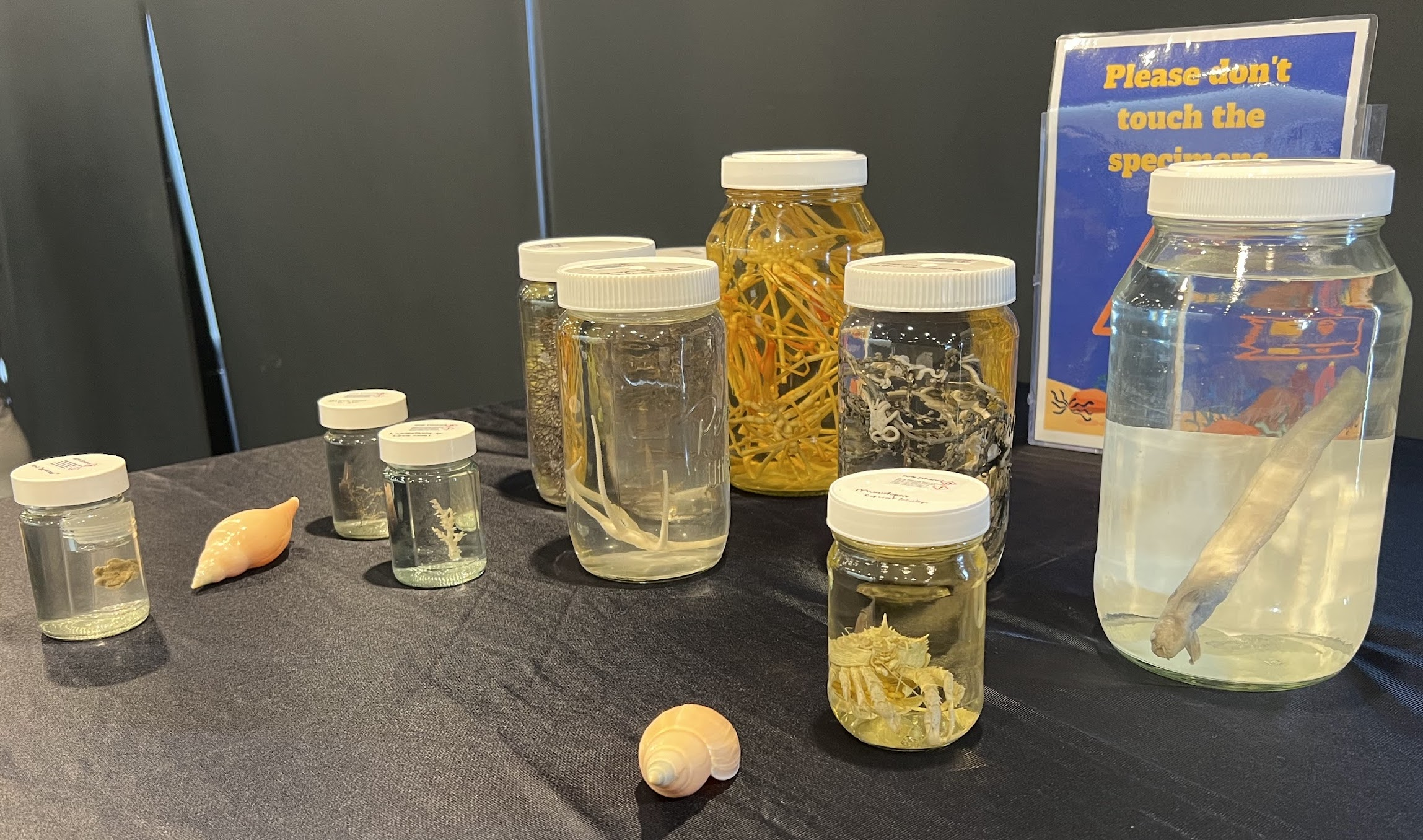
Ocean Census specimens

Mills has participated in over 20 biodiversity research expeditions while working for NIWA. These expeditions include vayages to Antarctica and around New Zealand. Mills has been on international research vessels and on the NIWA ship RV Tangaroa.

Mills was the co-leader of the 2024 Ocean Census Bounty Trough research expedition. The expedition gathered almost 1800 samples and discovered over 100 new ocean species including potentially three new species of fish.
