= Nick Mortimer =

English-born New Zealand geologist

- Born: England, United Kingdom
- Scientific career
- Fields: Geology, petrology
- Institutions: Institute of Geological and Nuclear Sciences Limited (GNS Science), New Zealand

Nick Mortimer is a New Zealand geologist, who has made a name for himself with his work on Zealandia.

Nick Mortimer was born in England and now lives in Dunedin, New Zealand. He studied geology and graduated with a Bachelor of Science with distinction in 1980. He then completed a PhD in geology and received his doctorate four years later.

Mortimer published his first papers in 1986/1987 while working at the Department of Geological Sciences at the University of British Columbia in Vancouver, Canada. He later has been working as a petrologist at the Dunedin Research Centre of the Institute of Geological and Nuclear Sciences (GNS Science) since 1994, where he is one of the "Principal Scientists". During his career, he has conducted research in Antarctica, Australia, Canada, the Pacific islands, the United States, and many areas of New Zealand.

Mortimer became known worldwide as the lead author of the article "Zealandia: Earth's Hidden Continent", which he published 2017 together with ten other scientists in the March issue of GSA Today, a scientific journal of the Geological Society of America and with which he received a broad response in the media worldwide.

== Membership and editor ==
Mortimer is a member of the:

- Geological Society of New Zealand
- New Zealand Geophysical Society
- New Zealand Skeptics
- American Geophysical Union

and senior editor of the scientific magazine NZ Journal of Geology & Geophysics.

== Selected publications ==
=== Books ===
- Nick Mortimer (2009). A Guide to the geology of the Riverton, Aparima district. Lower Hutt: Institute of Geological and Nuclear Sciences.
- Nick Mortimer, Hamish Campbell, Margaret Low (2011). A Photographic Guide to Rocks & Minerals of New Zealand. Lower Hutt: Institute of Geological and Nuclear Sciences. ISBN 978-1869662837.
- Nick Mortimer, Hamish Campbell (2014). Zealandia - Our Continent Revealed. London: Penguin Books. ISBN 978-0-143-57156-8.

=== Own publications in scientific journals ===
- Nick Mortimer (1986). "Late Triassic, arc-related, potassic igneous rocks in the North American Cordillera". Geology. 14 (12): 1035–1038. Bibcode:1986Geo....14.1035M. doi:10.1130/0091-7613(1986)14<1035:LTAPIR>2.0.CO;2.
- Nick Mortimer (December 1987). "The Nicola Group: Late Triassic and Early Jurassic subduction-related volcanism in British Columbia". Canadian Journal of Earth Sciences. 24 (12): 2521–2536. Bibcode:1987CaJES..24.2521M. doi:10.1139/e87-236.
- Nick Mortimer (1993). "Jurassic tectonic history of the Otago schist, New Zealand". Tectonics. 12 (1): 237–244. Bibcode:1993Tecto..12..237M. doi:10.1029/92TC01563.
- Nick Mortimer (1994). "Origin of the Torlesse terrane and coeval rocks, North Island, New Zealand". International Geology Review. 36 (10): 891–910. Bibcode:1994IGRv...36..891M. doi:10.1080/00206819409465494.
- Nick Mortimer (September 2000). "Metamorphic discontinuities in orogenic belts: example of the garnet– biotite–albite zone in the Otago Schist, New Zealand". International Journal of Earth Sciences. 89 (2): 295–306. Bibcode:2000IJEaS..89..295M. doi:10.1007/s005310000086.
- Nick Mortimer (2003). "A provisional structural thickness map of the Otago schist, New Zealand". American Journal of Science. 303 (7): 603–621. Bibcode:2003AmJS..303..603M. doi:10.2475/ajs.303.7.603.
- Nick Mortimer (January 2004). "New Zealand's geological foundations". Gondwana Research. 7 (1): 261–272. Bibcode:2004GondR...7..261M. doi:10.1016/S1342-937X(05)70324-5.

=== Publications as lead author in scientific journals ===
- Nick Mortimer, B. P. Roser (December 1992). "Geochemical evidence for the position of the Caples–Torlesse boundary in the Otago Schist, New Zealand". Journal of the Geological Society. 149 (6). London: 967–977. Bibcode:1992JGSoc.149..967M. doi:10.1144/gsjgs.149.6.0967.
- Nick Mortimer, Dave Parkinson (January 1996). "Hikurangi Plateau: a Cretaceous large igneous province in the southwest Pacific Ocean". Journal of Geophysical Research: Solid Earth. 101 (B1): 687–696. Bibcode:1996JGR...101..687M. doi:10.1029/95JB03037.
- Nick Mortimer, A. J. Tulloch, T. R. Ireland (1997). "Basement geology of Taranaki and Wanganui Basins, New Zealand". New Zealand Journal of Geology and Geophysics. 40 (2): 223–236. Bibcode:1997NZJGG..40..223M. doi:10.1080/00288306.1997.9514754.
- Nick Mortimer, R. H. Herzer, P. B. Gans, D. L. Parkinson, D. Seward (July 1998). "Basement geology from Three Kings Ridge to West Norfolk Ridge, southwest Pacific Ocean: evidence from petrology, geochemistry and isotopic dating of dredge samples". Marine Geology. 148 (3–4): 135–162. Bibcode:1998MGeol.148..135M. doi:10.1016/S0025-3227(98)00007-3.
- Nick Mortimer, A. J. Tulloch, R. N. Spark, N. W. Walker, E. Ladley, A. H. Allibone, David L. Kimbrough (July 1999). "Overview of the Median Batholith, New Zealand: a new interpretation of the geology of the Median Tectonic Zone and adjacent rocks". Journal of African Earth Sciences. 29 (1): 257–268. Bibcode:1999JAfES..29..257M. doi:10.1016/S0899-5362(99)00095-0.
- Nick Mortimer, Phil Gans, Andy Calvert, Nick Walker (September 1999). "Geology and thermochronometry of the east edge of the Median Batholith (Median Tectonic Zone): a new perspective on Permian to Cretaceous crustal growth of New Zealand". Island Arc. 8 (3): 404–425. Bibcode:1999IsArc...8..404M. doi:10.1046/j.1440-1738.1999.00249.x.
- Nick Mortimer, R. H. Herzer, N. W. Walker, A. T. Calvert, D. Seward, G. C. H. Chaproniere (2003). "Cavalli Seamount, Northland Plateau, SW Pacific Ocean: a Miocene metamorphic core complex?". Journal of the Geological Society. 160 (6): 971–983. Bibcode:2003JGSoc.160..971M. doi:10.1144/0016-764902-157.
- Nick Mortimer, Kaj Hoernle, F. Hauff, J. M. Palin, W. J. Dunlap, R. Werner, Kevin Faure (March 2006). "New constraints on the age and evolution of the Wishbone Ridge, southwest Pacific Cretaceous microplates, and Zealandia-West Antarctica breakup". Geology. 34 (3): 185–189. Bibcode:2006Geo....34..185M. doi:10.1130/G22168.1. hdl:1885/22254.
- Nick Mortimer, R. H. Herzer, P. B. Gans, C. Laporte-Magoni, A. T. Calvert, D. Bosch (February 2007). "Oligocene-Miocene tectonic evolution of the South Fiji Basin and Northland Plateau, SW Pacific Ocean: evidence from petrology and dating of dredged rocks". Marine Geology. 237 (1–2): 1–24. Bibcode:2007MGeol.237....1M. doi:10.1016/j.margeo.2006.10.033.
- Nick Mortimer, W. J. Dunlap, J. Michael Palin, R. H. Herzer, F. Hauff, M. Clark (March 2008). "Ultra-fast early Miocene exhumation of Cavalli Seamount, Northland Plateau, Southwest Pacific Ocean" (PDF). New Zealand Journal of Geology and Geophysics. 51 (1): 29–42. Bibcode:2008NZJGG..51...29M. doi:10.1080/00288300809509848.
- Nick Mortimer, Kohn Barry, D. Seward, T. Spell, A. Tulloch (November 2015). "Reconnaissance Thermochronology of Southern Zealandia". Journal of the Geological Society. 173 (2): 370–. doi:10.1144/jgs2015-021.
- Nick Mortimer, Hamish J. Campbell, Andy J. Tulloch, Peter R. King, Vaughan M. Stagpoole, Ray A. Wood, Mark S. Rattenbury, Rupert Sutherland, Chris J. Adams, Julien Collot, Maria Seton (2017). "Zealandia: Earth's Hidden Continent". GSA Today. 27 (3): 27–35. doi:10.1130/GSATG321A.1.

=== Publications as co-author in scientific journals ===
- T. A. Little, Nick Mortimer, M. McWilliams (1999). "An episodic Cretaceous cooling model for the Otago-Marlborough Schist, New Zealand, based on 40Ar/39Ar white mica ages". New Zealand Journal of Geology and Geophysics. 42 (3): 305–325. Bibcode:1999NZJGG..42..305L. doi:10.1080/00288306.1999.9514848.
- I. M. Turnbull, Nick Mortimer, D. Craw (2001). "Textural zones in the Haast Schist—a reappraisal". New Zealand Journal of Geology and Geophysics. 44 (1): 171–183. Bibcode:2001NZJGG..44..171T. doi:10.1080/00288306.2001.9514933.
- Daphne E. Lee, William G. Lee, Nick Mortimer (2001). "Where and why have all the flowers gone? Depletion and turnover in the New Zealand Cenozoic angiosperm flora in relation to palaeogeography and climate". Australian Journal of Botany. 49 (3). Clayton: 341–356. doi:10.1071/BT00031.
- A. J. Tulloch, J. Ramezani, Nick Mortimer, J. Mortensen, P. van den Bogaard, R. Maas (October 2009). "Cretaceous felsic volcanism in New Zealand and Lord Howe Rise (Zealandia) as a precursor to final Gondwana break-up". Special Publications. 321 (1). London: 89–118. Bibcode:2009GSLSP.321...89T. doi:10.1144/SP321.5.
