= Foulden Maar =

Fossil site in Otago, New Zealand

- Maar
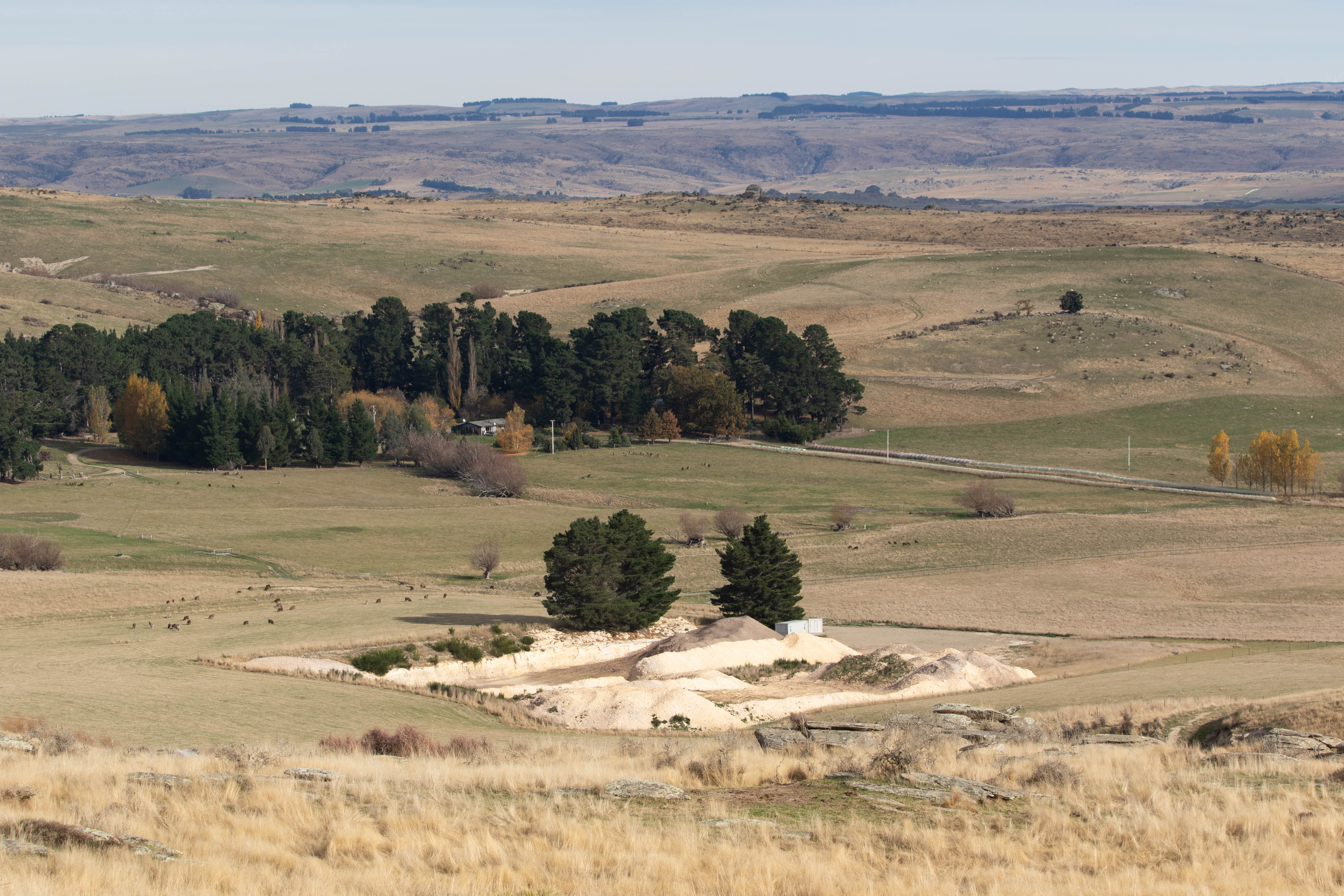
- Foulden Maar pit as seen from Moonlight Road
- Foulden Maar on map showing nearby surface basalt deposits. Legend: Key for the volcanics that are shown with panning is: basalt (shades of brown/orange); monogenetic basalts; undifferentiated basalts; arc basalts; arc ring basalts; olivine (basalts shades of olive); phonolite (pale salmon); dacite; andesite (shades of red); basaltic andesite; rhyolite, (ignimbrite is lighter shades of violet); plutonic or intusive (gray) - so dolerite/diabase/microgabbro will have shadings towards gray compared to erupted basalt.; Clicking on the rectangle icon enables full window and mouse-over with volcano name/wikilink and ages before present.
- Coordinates: 45.5268°S 170.2184°E
- Location: Otago, New Zealand
- Age: Miocene, ~23.2 Ma
- Volcanic field: Waipiata

Foulden Maar is a fossil site near Middlemarch in Otago, New Zealand. The fossils were deposited in the small deep crater lake of a maar formed around 23 million years ago by a volcano in the Miocene epoch. The crater lake existed for a period of around 130,000 years, and during this time it gradually filled up with diatomite, composed of annual layers of silica-shelled algae (diatoms).

These layers of diatomite have preserved exceptional fossils of fish from the crater lake, and plants, spiders and insects from the sub-tropical forest that developed around the crater. The site is the only known maar of its kind in the Southern Hemisphere and is one of New Zealand's pre-eminent fossil sites. A 2018 proposal to mine Foulden Maar for livestock-food additive attracted significant public opposition. The mining company went into receivership in 2019, and in 2023, the Dunedin City Council reached an agreement with the receivers to purchase the land, including the surrender of the mining permits.

== Etymology ==
Foulden Maar is named for the nearby farm of Foulden Hills, itself probably named after the town of Foulden in the Scottish Borders. Many other local locations—such as Kelso, Ettrick, Roxburgh, and the nearby Nenthorn—are similarly named.

== Volcanology ==
=== Dunedin Volcanic Group ===
The landscape of the east Otago region includes a large number of volcanoes. Early studies indicated there were separate volcanic areas within the region – Waipiata Volcanic Field and the Dunedin Volcanic Group which contained the Dunedin Volcano and basaltic monogenetic volcanoes like the maar. However, later research has found that these volcanic fields overlap in both space and time.

Foulden Maar is now considered to be one of around 150 volcanoes in the Dunedin Volcanic Group. Eruptions within the group began around 25 Ma near Middlemarch and finished with the youngest in the group by around 9 Ma. The group is considered extinct.

=== The maar ===
A maar is a volcanic crater with a low rim that is formed in an explosion (known as a phreatomagmatic eruption), when magma or hot lava comes into contact with groundwater. The maar typically fills with water to become a crater lake. Foulden Maar is a maar-diatreme volcano. The diatreme is a long vertical conduit where gas-filled magma rises to the surface of the Earth during an eruption.

The Foulden Maar crater is filled with fossilised diatomite as well as sedimentary rock, debris flows, and pyroclastic rocks.

=== Dating the eruption ===
Two main methods have been used for dating the eruption of Foulden Maar. These are biostratigraphy and radiometric dating, based on analysis of samples from drill cores to depth of 180 metres (590 ft) taken at the site in June 2009.

==== Biostratigraphy ====
Sedimentary rocks in New Zealand can be dated using analysis based on existing data about the first and last occurrences of key taxa in fossil records. Fossil pollen from the Foulden Maar drill cores has been dated at 23 Ma with reference to fossil pollen found at other fossil sites in Southland and Otago.

==== Radiometric dating ====
This method uses the known rate of decay of radioactive isotopes present in minerals. In this case, the analysis was based on the decay of isotopes of argon. Analysis of volcanic clast taken from a depth of 126 metres (413 ft) in the drill core indicated an age of 23.38 Ma. Subsequent dating adjustment is to 23.2 ± 0.4 Ma.

==== Other evidence ====
A geomagnetic reversal was discovered in minerals at a depth of around 107 metres (351 ft) in the drill core. A global magnetic polarity time scale shows few reversals in the general time frame indicated by other dating methods for the eruption, and the reversal found in the drill core provides supporting evidence for the age.

== Geology ==
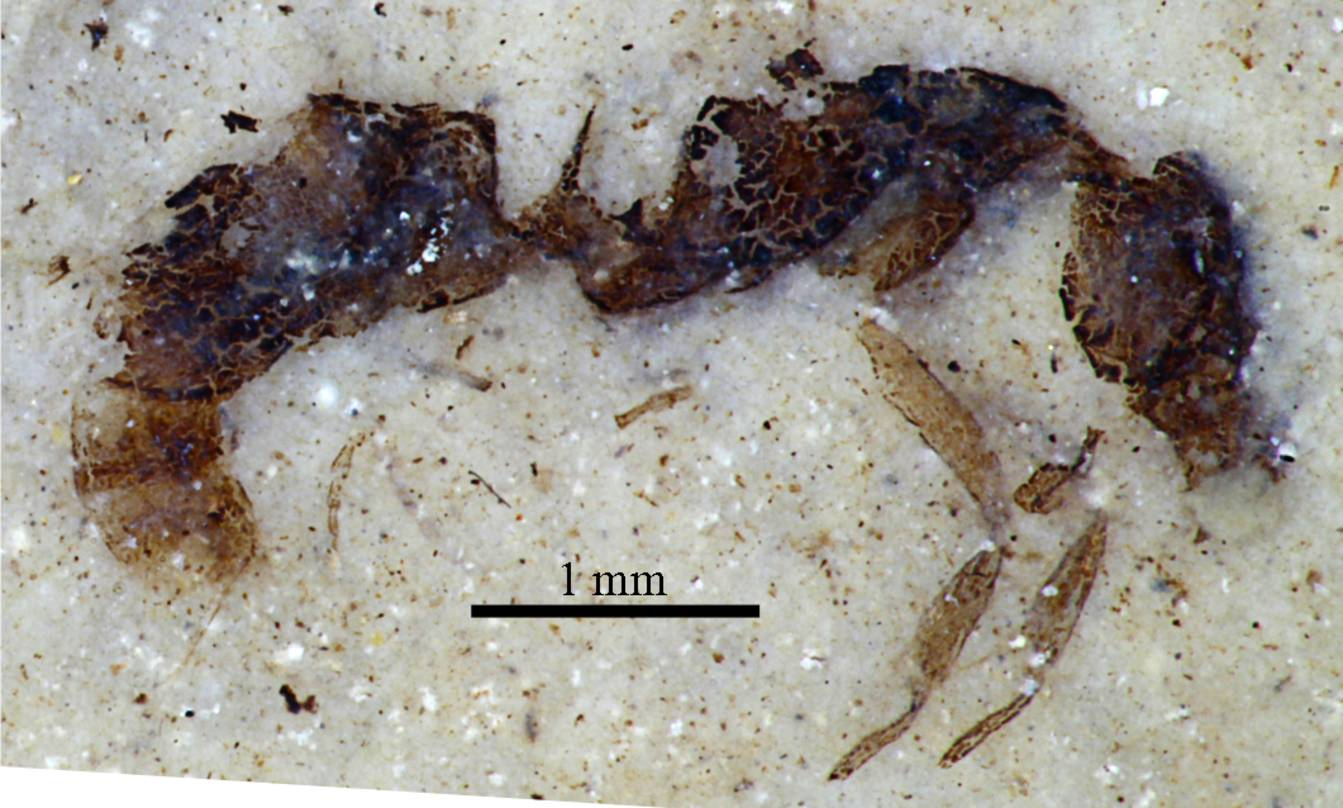
Holotype of the ant Austroponera schneideri

The Foulden Maar crater is approximately 1,000 metres (3,300 ft) in diameter; its sediments are known to be at least 183 metres (600 ft) deep with 120 metres (390 ft) of diatomite layers overlying mixed volcanic and diatomite layers. The Foulden Maar lake formed in a volcanic crater during the Waitakian (early Miocene), approximately 23 million years ago. It was deep and anoxic at the bottom, which precluded decomposition of plant and animal remains. The lake was hydrologically isolated, meaning that no rivers or streams disturbed the sedimentation, which formed multiple laminated layers. These thin layers of silica are known as diatomite, as they are composed primarily of one diatom species, Encyonema jordaniforme Krammer, that grew on submerged rocks or aquatic plants in the lake. As the lake gradually filled in and dried out, the diatomite layers capture a detailed fossil record of about 130,000 years.

== Palaeontology ==
Foulden Maar is one of New Zealand's pre-eminent fossil sites, and is unique in the Southern Hemisphere for the time period it covers. Fossils were first discovered at the site by gold prospectors in the early 1870s and were described as "polishing powder" by the geologists Frederick Hutton and George Ulrich in 1875.

Although excavations have been limited to a small area the size of a tennis court, palaeontologists have discovered hundreds of not previously described species. The sediments are rich in fossil flowers, fruits, seeds, pollen, and bark from plants, as well as fungi. Several new species of plants have been discovered, and the fossil plant genus Fouldenia is named in honour of its type locality Foulden Maar. The first-recorded New Zealand broad-leaved fossil Podocarpus, Podocarpus travisiae, has also been described from this site.

Fossilised freshwater fish are common. The earliest galaxiid fish fossil and the earliest known fossilised eel both come from Foulden Maar. Numerous arthropod fossils have been found at the site, among them Araneae (spiders), Plecoptera (stoneflies), Odonata (dragonflies), Isoptera (termites), Hemiptera (true bugs), Diptera (true flies), Coleoptera (beetles), Trichoptera (caddis flies), and Hymenoptera (wasps, ants and bees). The four arachnids found at Foulden Maar are the first arachnid fossils identified in New Zealand; previous spider specimens had been found in amber but were not identifiable. The first fossil hymenopteran in New Zealand is an ant found at Foulden Maar. Fossils of immature aquatic flies obtained from Foulden Maar are helping scientists to shed light on the ecological history of true flies in New Zealand.

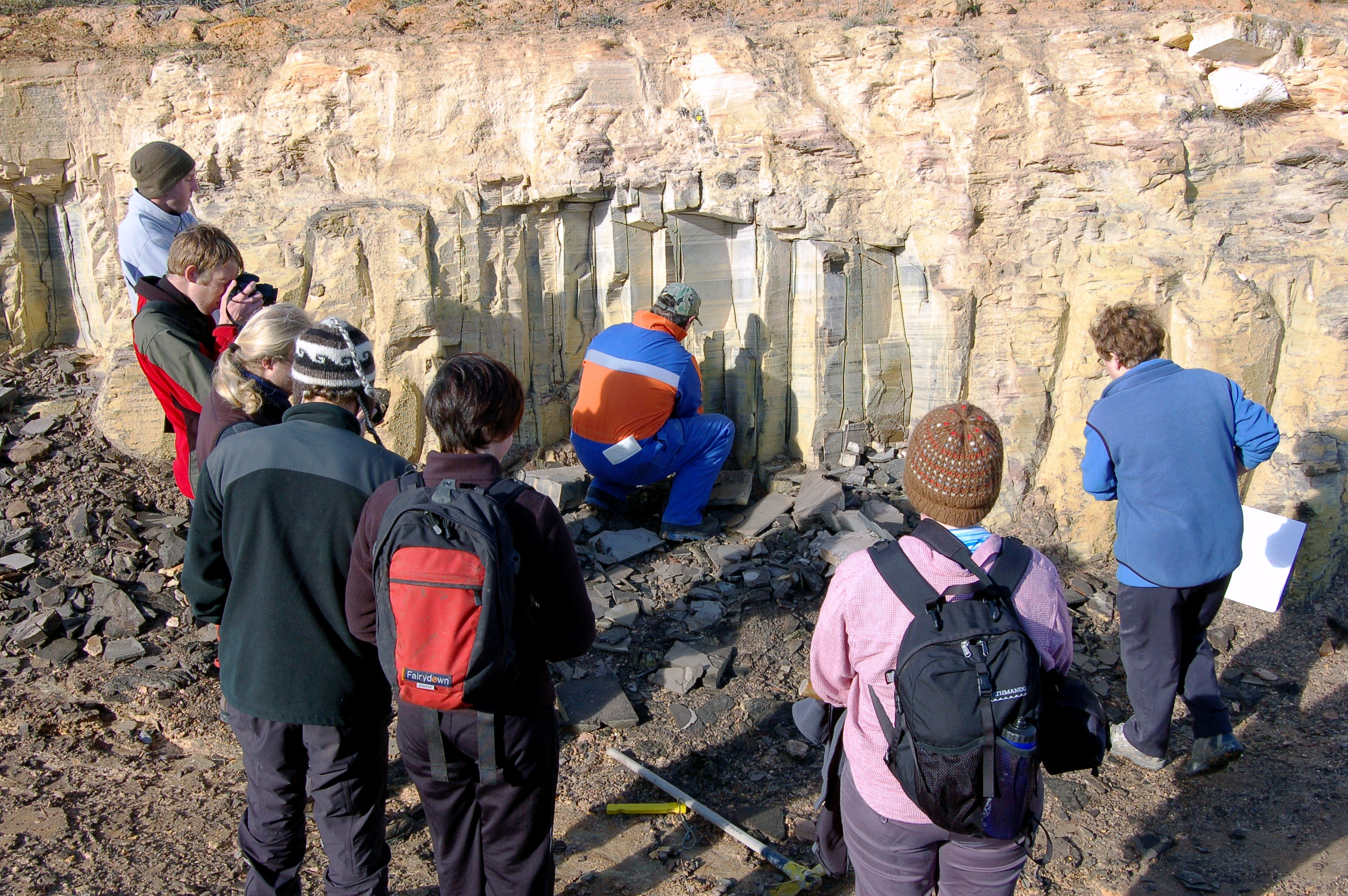
University of Otago students visiting the fossil site in 2006

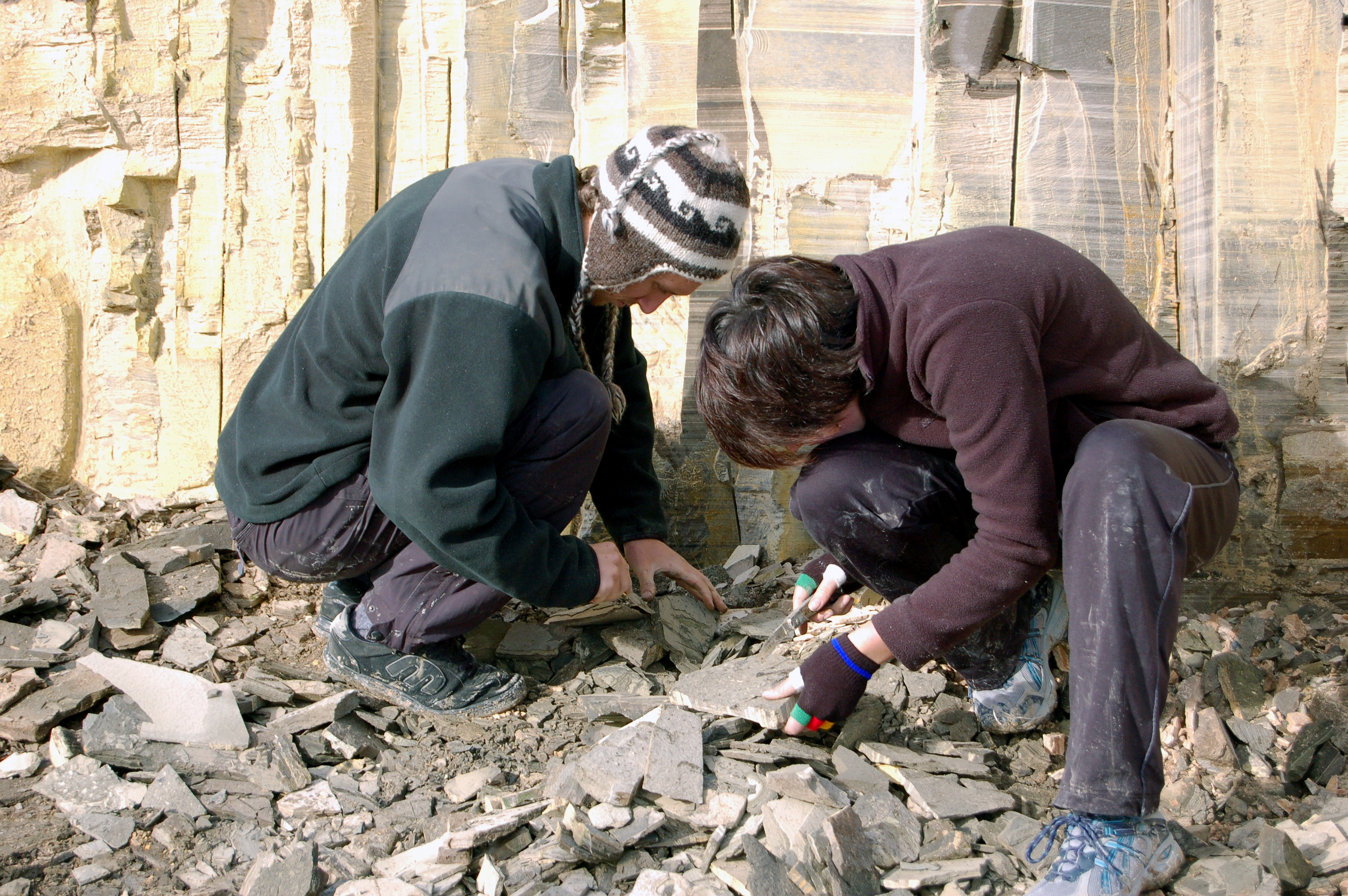
Searching for fossils

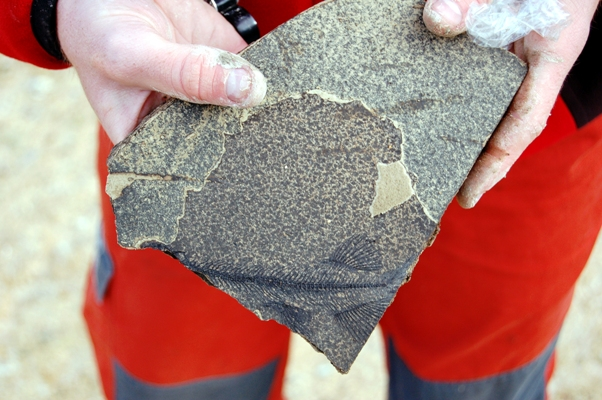
A fossil fish

== Palaeoecology ==
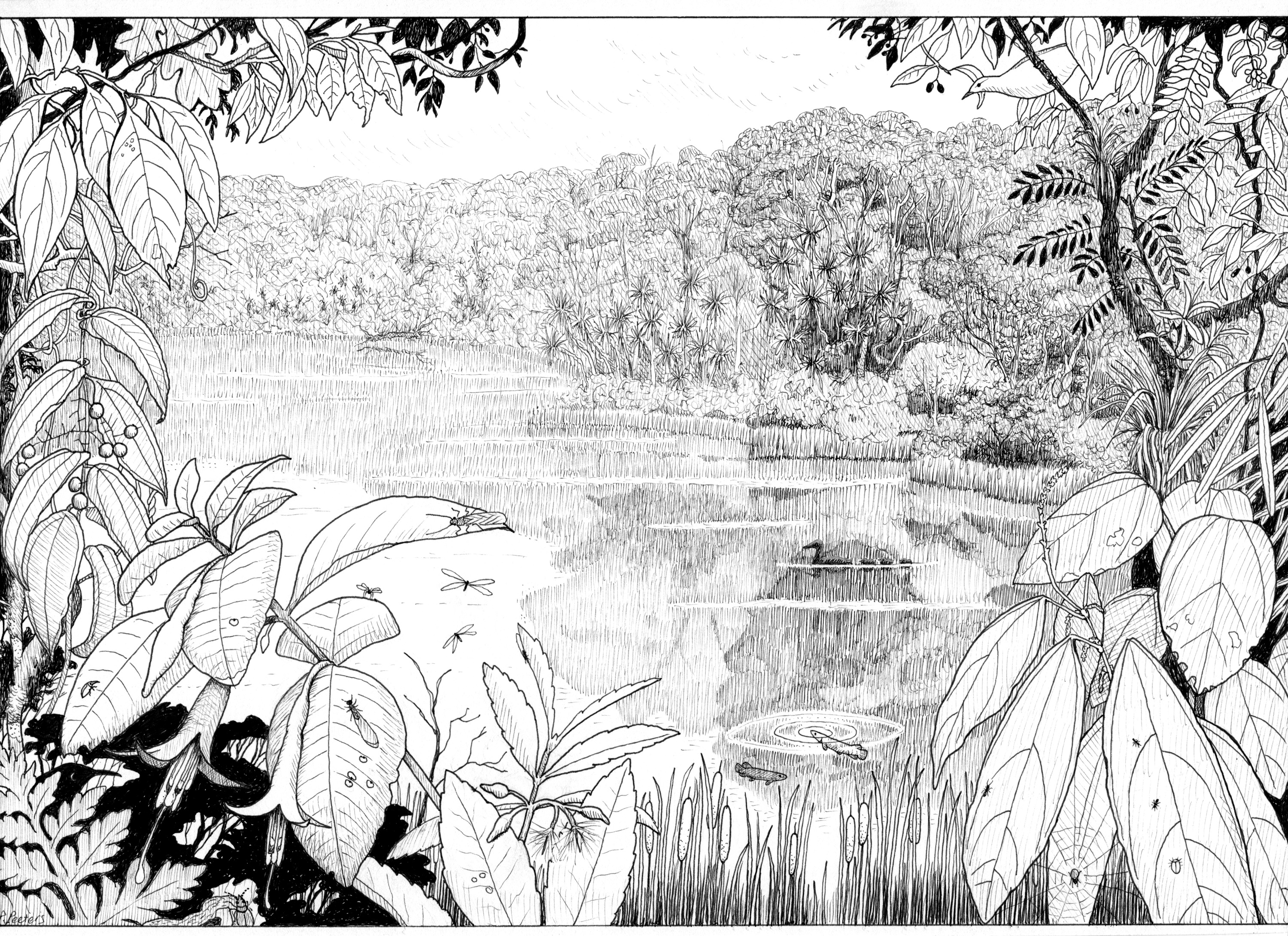
This reconstruction of the lake at Foulden Maar 23 million years ago was commissioned by palaeontologist Dr. Daphne Lee and drawn by artist/ecologist Dr. Paula Peeters

The fossil evidence derived from pollen and spores suggests a warm temperate or sub-tropical rain forest with canopy trees, with an understorey of shrubs, ferns and on the margins pioneer species. Climatically, the area resembled modern-day south-eastern Queensland with species that no longer occur in the New Zealand flora. The lake contained small and large galaxiid fishes and eels, ducks (inferred from coprolites), and likely crocodiles as well.

Leaf fossils from the deposit have been used to link past spikes in carbon dioxide levels with melting of Antarctic ice, and the variations in the laminations of the diatomite have been studied to reveal the New Zealand climate from that time.

== Mining ==
Diatomite was extracted in small quantities from the site during World War II when transport difficulties hindered access to foreign sources. Diatomite has a range of applications, depending primarily on purity, diatom size, and the trace elements present.

=== 1990s operation ===
Foulden Maar is on privately owned land. The area was initially developed for mining by Featherston Resources Ltd in 1997. The deposit was estimated as 5 million tonnes (Mt) by NZ Petroleum and Minerals. This proved uneconomic for the company, and its assets were sold to Plaman Resources Ltd in March 2015.

=== 2019 proposal ===
Plaman Resources claimed the size of the deposit was 31 Mt. The shareholders for Plaman Resources are Iris Corporation, Kuala Lumpur, Malaysia (50.95 percent) and Burleigh Nominees Ltd, Douglas, Isle of Man (49.05 percent). Plaman Resources' shareholders, the Iris Corporation and Burleigh Nominees, have allegedly been involved in corruption and humans-rights abuses and have unpaid debts. It was unclear if Iris Corporation would remain a shareholder of Plaman if Overseas Investment Office (OIO) approval for the mine was received.

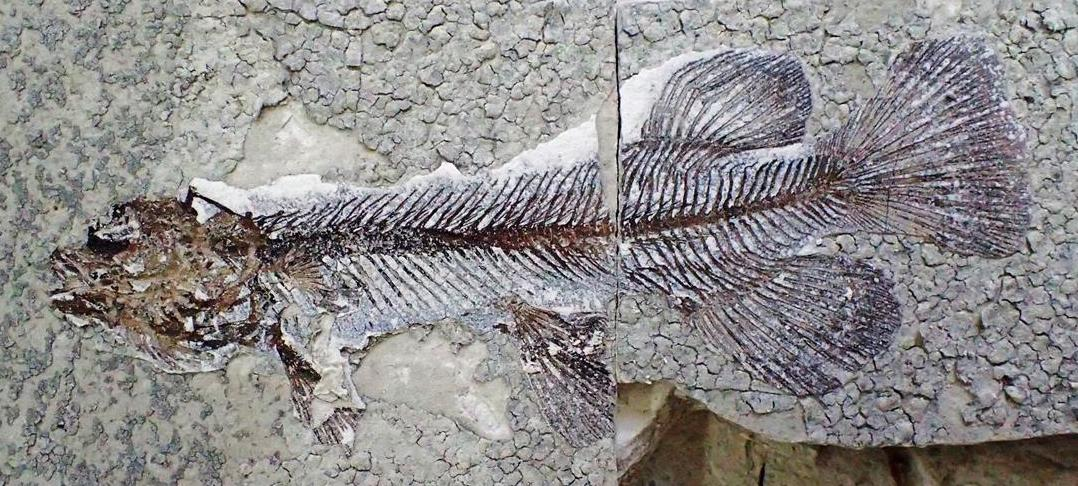
Galaxias effusus from Foulden Maar is the oldest known species of Galaxias, the group to which whitebait belong.

Plaman held the mining rights and planned to turn all of the fossil-containing diatomite into an additive for incorporating into the food of intensively farmed animals such as ducks and pigs. Initial seed funding of about US$20 million (NZ$28 million) was raised through Goldman Sachs New Zealand Holdings, the Auckland branch of New York stock-exchange listed investment bank in August 2018. The financial viability of these plans was reported to hinge on the purchase of an adjoining farm, which the OIO must rule on. No timetable was set for the decision. The proposal involved building a new $36.8m processing plant at Milton to crush the diatomite before shipping offshore from Port Chalmers or Bluff. It was estimated by the company that the trucking and processing would create 100 jobs over 27 years. Plaman discussed with local councils applying to New Zealand's Provincial Growth Fund for help with the costs of building the processing plant, although no application was made.

Previous mining at the site yielded low-quality diatomite only suitable for inclusion in concrete, rather than the high-quality product Plaman was marketing as "Black Pearl". Plaman claimed that livestock will benefit nutritionally from Black Pearl, because the diatomite is "rich in natural organic matter (which contains humics, such as humic and fulvic acid) and other valuable nutrients, which have been shown to be beneficial in animal nutrition." Animal nutrition experts expressed doubt that the product produced by Plaman will have any animal-health benefits, as there is no published data to support their claims. Concerns were expressed by the New Zealand Green Party that the diatomite would be sold as fertiliser to support the production of palm oil.

Plaman Resources offered to refrain from mining nearby Hindon Maar if opposition to the Foulden Maar proposal was dropped. They also offered to set aside 5 hectares (12 acres) (12–20% of the deposit) of the eastern pit at Foulden Maar for scientific research, but geologists said that if the deposit is drained for mining the fossils may be lost regardless.

The company was placed in receivership and voluntary liquidation in June 2019, and the OIO approval process was placed on hold. The Save Foulden Maar group considered crowdfunding to permanently protect the site.

==== Opposition ====
Some locals were opposed to the anticipated levels of dust, noise, and general disruption the proposed mine would create. The Otago Regional Council granted Plaman Resources resource consent to discharge air dust for the purpose of quarrying diatomite until 1 July 2020. The original mining permit was for 20 years but was extended to November 2033. A wider group of people concerned about the loss of the unique fossil record described as "Dunedin's Pompeii" and an "irreplaceable treasure box" launched a petition to preserve the site, garnering nearly 10,000 signatures in the first month. A leaked report by Goldman Sachs details the engagement of former Labour MP Clayton Cosgrove as a lobbyist to "secure approval" for the mine.

Some locals wanted to see the area turned into a geo-park, along similar lines to other diatomite sites in Norway, Germany, and China. Former Prime Minister Helen Clark suggested that the site could be protected as a scientific reserve under the Reserves Act 1977, saying "It just doesn't stack up. It's a question of values. Do we value knowledge? Do we value natural heritage? Do we value science and research, or do we just want to a quick dollar from a low value pit? I mean, really, it's distressing."

MP Clare Curran voiced support for the mining proposal, saying that she had been given assurances by Plaman. She argued that "misinformation" was abundant due to the slow overseas-investment-approval process and said that the resource-consent process would still need to be followed. Dunedin Mayor Dave Cull, who wrote a letter of support for the mining proposal, publicly called for clarification from Plaman after hearing details of the leaked Goldman Sachs report. Clutha Mayor Bryce Cadogan, who also supported the proposal, expressed frustration that commercial sensitivity prevented the release of all the information in favour of the mine.

Dunedin City Council councillor Aaron Hawkins proposed that the council should "recognise the importance of Foulden Maar, and support its preservation, and protection as a scientific resource", and the council voted to do so, later formally opposing the mining proposal. The council made this decision after hearing from Daphne Lee, a palaeontologist and associate professor at the University of Otago, explaining the scientific importance of the site. The University of Otago also formally opposed the mining proposal. Sir Alan Mark, chair of the environmental group the Wise Response Society, called for the government to purchase the site and establish a geological reserve.

Juliet Gerrard, the Prime Minister's Chief Science Adviser, said that "the tale is far from simple and at least two weak spots at the interface of science and policy are exposed as we dig through the complexities: there is no obvious point in central government to consider the value of a fossil record; and the science community has perhaps not previously sufficiently communicated the national and international value of this geological site." The Geoscience Society of New Zealand called for the mining proposal to be stopped, with President Jennifer Eccles saying, "New Zealand's national identity is strongly bound to its unique plants and animals. We cannot stand by and see this fountain of paleontological knowledge about where we have come from destroyed; particularly not for so little transient local and national gain."

In November 2019, the Dunedin City Council issued a "notice of desire" under the Public Works Act, signalling the intention to purchase the land and return it to public ownership. As of September 2022, the Dunedin City Council had not proceeded with acquiring the land under the Public Works Act, and the protection of the site remained unclear. Scientists were unable to access the site.

=== Surrender of mining permits ===
In February 2023, the Dunedin City Council reached an agreement with the receivers for Plaman Resources for the purchase 42 hectares (100 acres) of land at the site. The agreement included Plaman surrendering mining permits. The total cost of the purchase was $924,000.

== See also ==
- Natural history of New Zealand
