= Submerged continent =

Large continental mass mainly undersea

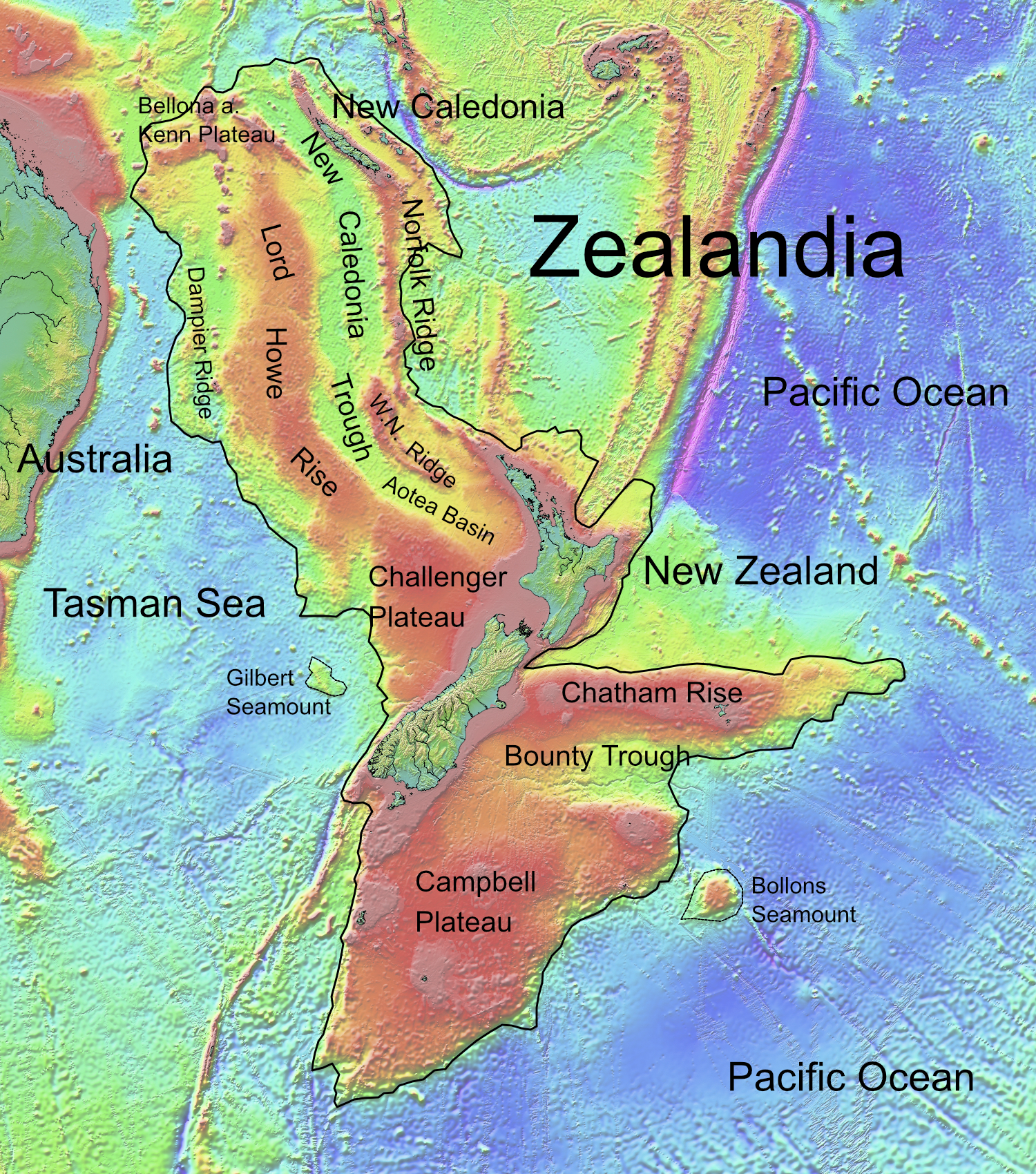
Topographic map of Zealandia

A submerged continent or a sunken continent is a region of continental crust, extensive in size but mainly undersea. The terminology is used by some paleogeologists and geographers in reference to some landmasses (none of which are as large as any of the seven generally-recognized continents).

== Definition ==
The definition of this term is unclear. If continental fragments and microcontinents smaller than 2,500,000 km^{2} (970,000 mi^{2}), which is approximately one third of the area of mainland Australia, are excluded, then Zealandia (approximately 4,900,000 km^{2} or 1,900,000 mi^{2}) would be the only geological feature which is classifiable as a submerged continent.

== Notable examples ==
Other notable submerged lands include Beringia, Doggerland, the Kerguelen Plateau, Mauritia, Sahul, and Sunda.

== History ==
Submerged continents have been sought and speculated about in regard to a possible "lost continent" underwater in the Atlantic Ocean. There was also a search in the 1930s for Lemuria, thought to have been a possible submerged continent between the Indian and African coasts.

== See also ==
- Continental fragment – Part of a continent broken from its main mass
- Lost lands – Islands or continents supposedly existing during prehistory, having since disappeared
- List of mythological places
- Zealandia – Mostly submerged continental crust area in Oceania
