= Landmass =

Large area of land

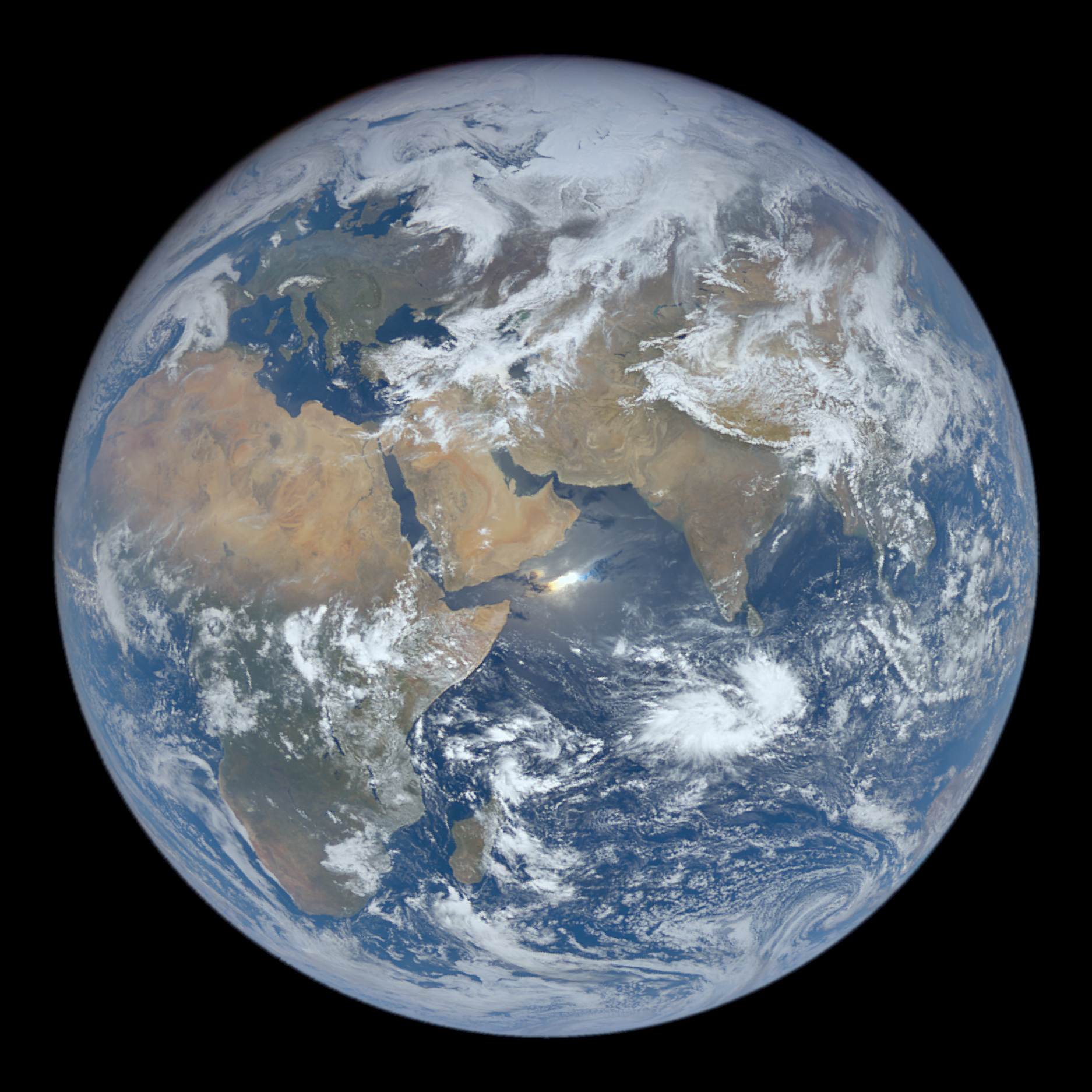
Afro-Eurasia, the largest landmass on Earth

A landmass, or land mass, is a large region or area of land that is in one piece and not noticeably broken up by oceans. The term is often used to refer to lands surrounded by an ocean or sea, such as a continent or a large island. In the field of geology, a landmass is a defined section of continental crust extending above sea level.

Continents are often thought of as distinct landmasses and may include any islands that are part of the associated continental shelf. When multiple continents form a single contiguous land connection, the connected continents may be viewed as a single landmass. Earth's largest landmasses are (starting with largest):

1. Afro-Eurasia (main landmass of the geoscheme region of the same name and its continental parts Africa and Eurasia, or Europe and Asia; the center of Earth's land hemisphere, comprising more than half of Earth's landmass)
2. Americas (main landmass of the geo-region of the same name and its continental parts North and South America; comprising most of the landmass of the Western Hemisphere)
3. Antarctica (main landmass of the geo-region and continent of the same name)
4. Mainland Australia (main landmass of the geo-region Oceania, its subregion Australasia, the continent Australia and the country Australia)

== Continental landmasses ==
Generally, the continental landmasses are not all classified as islands despite being completely surrounded by water. (Note: The United States Geological Survey is a notable exception. The United States-based scientific agency classifies all landmasses (including all continental mainlands except Antarctica) surrounded by water as islands. Under their definition, Africa, Australia, Eurasia, North America, and South America are classified as continental mainland islands.) However, because the definition of continent varies between geographers, the Americas are sometimes defined as two separate continents while mainland Australia is sometimes defined as an island as well as a continent. (Note: Geoscience Australia notes that 'Australia is often referred to as an island continent')

Nevertheless, for the purposes of this list, mainland Australia along with the other three major landmasses have been listed as continental landmasses for comparison. The figures are approximations and are for the four continental landmasses only. (Note: Physiographically, there are only four continents (including offshore continental islands which sit on the nearby continental shelves) that are completely surrounded by the ocean: Africa-Eurasia (57% of the global land area), the Americas (28.5%), Antarctica (9%), and Australia (5%). The remaining 0.5% is made up of remote oceanic islands, mostly scattered within Oceania in the central and south Pacific Ocean.)

Rank	Continental landmass (Note: Including continental landmasses which are above water and over 2,500,000 km^{2} (970,000 sq mi). The submerged continent of Zealandia (approx. 5,000,000 km^{2} (1,900,000 sq mi)) is excluded.)	Area		Nation(s)	Notes
Rank	Continental landmass	(km^{2})	(sq mi)	Nation(s)	Notes
I	Afro-Eurasia (Africa-Eurasia)	79,810,726 (Note: Figure derived from the Global Islands Explorer website, by adding the areas of mainland Africa (29,370,907 km^{2} (11,340,171 sq mi)) and mainland Eurasia (50,439,819 km^{2} (19,474,923 sq mi)).)	30,815,094	126 countries 6 de facto states	48 countries and two de facto states on mainland Africa. (Note: Egypt has a small portion of its land located on mainland Eurasia.); 78 countries and four de facto states on mainland Eurasia: 1. 38 countries and two de facto states on continental Asia. (Note: Azerbaijan, Georgia, Kazakhstan, and Turkey each have a small portion of their land located on continental Europe. Malaysia has a significant portion of its land located on an island.) (Note: Abkhazia and South Ossetia are both located south of the Greater Caucasus watershed, and thus they are geographically parts of Asia.); 2. 40 countries and two de facto states on continental Europe (Note: Russia has a big portion of its land located on continental Asia. Denmark's capital city is located on an island.)
II	America (landmass)	37,699,623 (Note: Figure derived from the Global Islands Explorer website, by adding the areas of mainland North America (20,090,075 km^{2} (7,756,821 sq mi)) and mainland South America (17,609,548 km^{2} (6,799,084 sq mi)).)	14,555,906	22 countries 1 overseas territory	Ten countries on mainland North America. (Note: Depending on the definition, a significant portion of Panama (land east of the Panama Canal) could be considered a part of mainland South America.); Twelve countries and an overseas department and region of France on mainland South America.
III	Antarctica	12,272,800 (Note: Area of mainland Antarctica, without the ice shelves and nearby islands.)	4,738,600	None (Note: Seven countries have made eight territorial claims. All territorial claims in Antarctica are in abeyance under the Antarctic Treaty System.)	Antarctica is a special case, for if its ice is considered not as land, but as water, it is not a single landmass, but several landmasses of much smaller area, since the ice-bedrock boundary is below sea level in many regions of the continent. If its ice cover were to be lifted, some rocks that are currently below sea level would rise as the weight of the ice would be removed, although this would in part be counteracted, and in some areas of the continent overtaken, by eustatic rises in sea level.
IV	Australia (landmass)	7,591,608 (Note: Figure derived from the Geoscience Australia website, the area of mainland Tasmania (64,519 km^{2} (24,911 sq mi)) has been deducted. The Global Islands Explorer website has given a slightly larger figure of 7,618,696 km^{2} (2,941,595 sq mi) for the area of mainland Australia.)	2,931,136	Australia	Mainland Australia is more than three times the size of Greenland, the largest island. Australia is sometimes dubbed "The Island Continent" or "Earth's largest island, but its smallest continent".

Dymaxion map (Fuller map) with continental landmasses (I,II,III,IV) and largest islands (1–30) roughly to scale

== See also ==
- Coastline paradox
- Continent
  - Boundaries between the continents of Earth
- Island
  - List of islands by area
- Landform
  - Glossary of landforms
- Mainland
- Supercontinent
- Pangaea
