= Alex Rogers (rugby union) =

English rugby union player

Alex Rogers (born 16 December 1986 (age 39) in England) was a rugby union player. As of 2015 he played for the Newcastle Falcons in the English Premiership.

Rogers played as a prop. Previously he played for Harlequins.
