= Alex Rogers (biologist) =

Alex D. Rogers is professor of conservation biology and fellow of Somerville College, University of Oxford.
