= New Zealand Journal of Geology and Geophysics =

New Zealand peer-reviewed science journal

- Discipline: Earth sciences
- Language: English

Publication details
- History: 1958–present
- Publisher: Taylor & Francis (New Zealand)
- Frequency: Quarterly

Standard abbreviations
- ISO 4: N. Z. J. Geol. Geophys.

Indexing
- ISSN: 0028-8306 (print); 1175-8791 (web)
- OCLC no.: 946807346

Links
- Journal homepage; Publisher's portal

The New Zealand Journal of Geology and Geophysics is a peer-reviewed academic journal published by Taylor & Francis on behalf of the Royal Society Te Apārangi. The journal is issued quarterly in print, with additional open access and other material published online. First published in 1958 by New Zealand's former Department of Scientific and Industrial Research, it covers topics in the earth sciences relevant to New Zealand and its surrounding regions in Antarctica and the Pacific Rim.
