= Bounty Trough =

Depression in the submerged eastern part of Zealandia

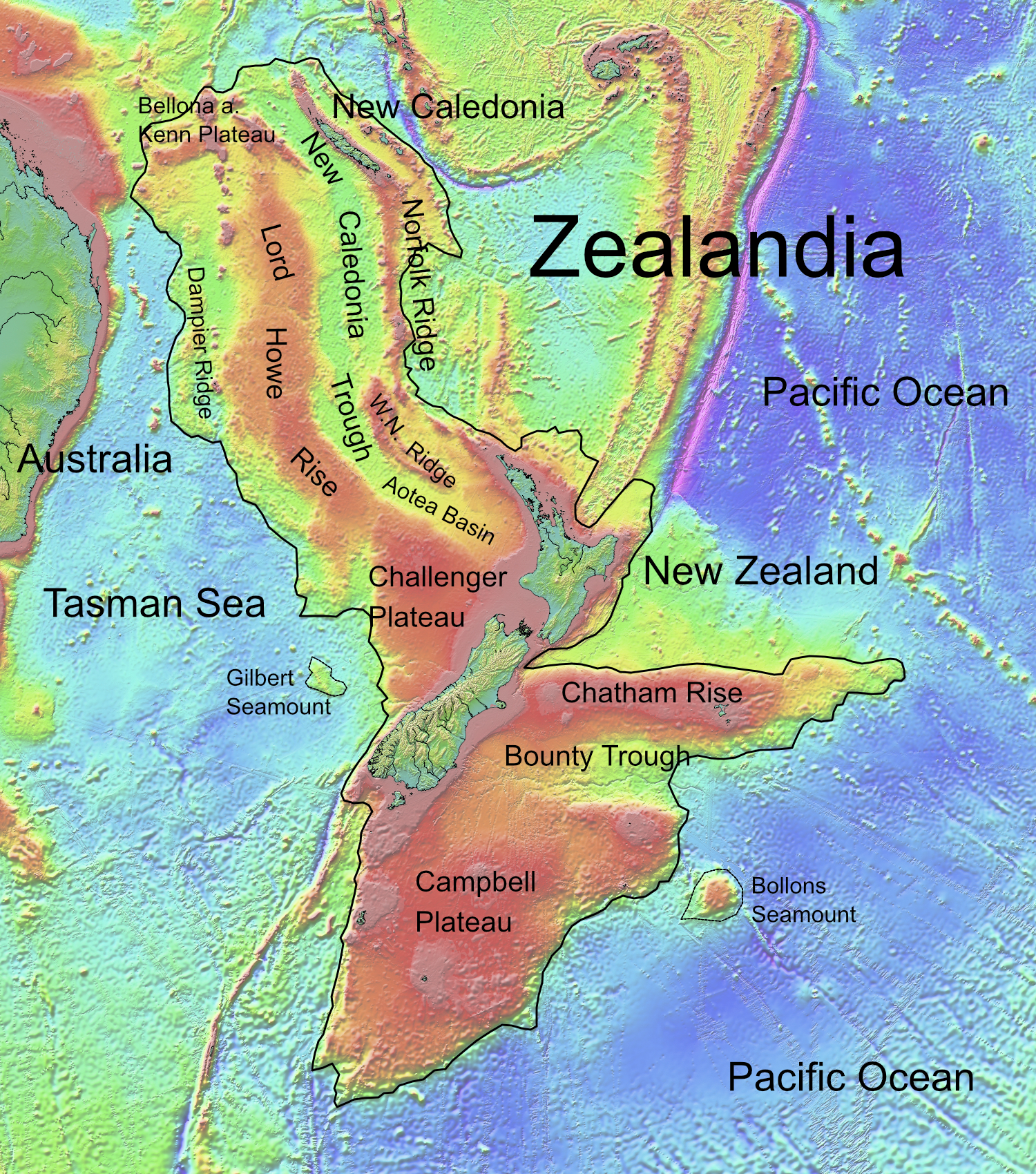
Topographic map of Zealandia showing the Bounty Trough

The Bounty Trough is a major submerged feature, a bathymetric depression, of the oceanography of the southwest Pacific Ocean. It is located off the east coast of New Zealand's South Island. It is named after the Bounty Islands near the Eastern end of the trough. The islands, in turn, are named after HMS Bounty.

== Extent ==
The Bounty Trough is located to the South of the Chatham Rise, and North of the Campbell Plateau. It runs East-West for a distance of some 800 kilometres (497 mi) to the deep ocean between the Chatham and Bounty Island groups. The Bounty Trough's western extremity is less than 50 kilometres (31 mi) off the South Island's coast. It covers an area of approximately 100,000 km^{2} (38,610 sq mi).

Much of The Bounty Trough lies at depths of 2,000–3,000 metres (6,562–9,843 ft), and it marks an indentation in the "coastline" of the largely submerged continent of Zealandia.

== Geology ==
A curious feature of the Bounty Trough is that it marks the continuation of several main river features in the South Island – the "Otago Fan Complex". This is a distinct series of channels existing in the base of the trough which is an extension of the Clutha and Waitaki River systems.

Both these rivers, especially the Clutha, are noted for their fast flow. This alone would not account for the existence of the channels, though much of their current contours was probably shaped by sediment during the ice ages.

The channel system is the remnant of a Cretaceous (failed) rift formed via ocean-floor spreading at the time when Zealandia separated from Antarctica between 130 and 85 Mya. The channels provide a major transportation system for sediments from the major rivers in the eastern South Island. At the Eastern end of the rift is the abyssal Bounty Fan.

In July 2012, the NIWA research ship RV Tangaroa mapped the area finding a structure of nine canyons ending in "a large deep apron-shaped sediment deposit in the Bounty Trough". The survey considered development of a biodiversity assessment of the area which would then support "potential environmental effects of any oil drilling, and help establish environmental guidelines specific to the area". The mapping also found "pock marks" some 20 m (66 ft) deep by 200 m (656 ft) in diameter in the margins which may indicate methane seepage. The survey could support petrochemical exploration, though, Roberts et al. found evidence of "an extensive and effective petroleum system" to be "conjectural".

Both the Otago and abyssal fans, and the rift itself developed from the Kaikoura Orogeny and were greatly accelerated after about 2.5 Ma, with the onset of global glacial/interglacial climatic cycles and the development of an icecap along the alpine region of South Island. The glacial periods contributed large amounts of sediment to the trough. Sediment is not being deposited now in the same way as it was during the glacial period.
