= Zealandia =

Mostly submerged continental crust area in Oceania

Coordinates: 40°S 170°E

Map of Zealandia

Map of New Caledonia and New Zealand, the two main areas that make up Zealandia

Zealandia (pronounced /ziːˈlændiə/), also known as Te Riu-a-Māui (Māori) or Tasmantis (from the Tasman Sea), is an almost entirely submerged mass of continental crust in Oceania that subsided after breaking away from Gondwana 83–79 million years ago. It has been described variously as a submerged continent, continental fragment, and microcontinent. The name and concept for Zealandia was proposed by Bruce Luyendyk in 1995, and satellite imagery shows it to be almost the size of Australia. A 2021 study suggests Zealandia is over one billion years old, about twice the age previously theorised by geologists.

By about 23 million years ago, the landmass may have been completely submerged. Today, most of the landmass (94%) remains submerged beneath the Pacific Ocean. New Zealand is the largest portion of Zealandia above sea level, followed by New Caledonia.

Mapping of Zealandia concluded in 2023. With a total area of approximately 4,900,000 km^{2} (1,900,000 mi^{2}), Zealandia is substantially larger than any other features termed microcontinents and continental fragments. If classified as a microcontinent, Zealandia would be the world's largest microcontinent. Its area is six times the area of the next-largest microcontinent, Madagascar, and more than half the exposed land area of the Australian continent. Zealandia is more than twice the size of the largest intraoceanic large igneous province (LIP) in the world, the Ontong Java Plateau (approximately 1,900,000 km^{2} or 730,000 mi^{2}), and the world's largest island, Greenland (2,166,086 km^{2} or 836,330 mi^{2}). Zealandia is also substantially larger than the Arabian Peninsula (3,237,500 km^{2} or 1,250,000 mi^{2}), the world's largest peninsula, and the Indian subcontinent (4,300,000 km^{2} or 1,700,000 mi^{2}). Due to these and other geological considerations, such as crustal thickness and density, some geologists from New Zealand, New Caledonia, and Australia have concluded that Zealandia fulfills all the requirements to be considered a continent rather than a microcontinent or continental fragment. Geologist Nick Mortimer commented that if it were not for the ocean level, it would have been recognised as such long ago.

Zealandia supports substantial inshore fisheries and contains gas fields, of which the largest known is the New Zealand Maui gas field, near Taranaki. Permits for oil exploration in the Great South Basin were issued in 2007. Offshore mineral resources include ironsands, volcanic massive sulfides and ferromanganese nodule deposits.

== Etymology ==
GNS Science recognises two names for the landmass. In English, the most common name is Zealandia, a latinate name for New Zealand, itself referring to the Dutch Zeeland province; the name was coined in the mid-1990s and became established through common use. In the Māori language, the landmass is named Te Riu-a-Māui, meaning 'the hills, valleys, and plains of Māui'.

== Geology ==
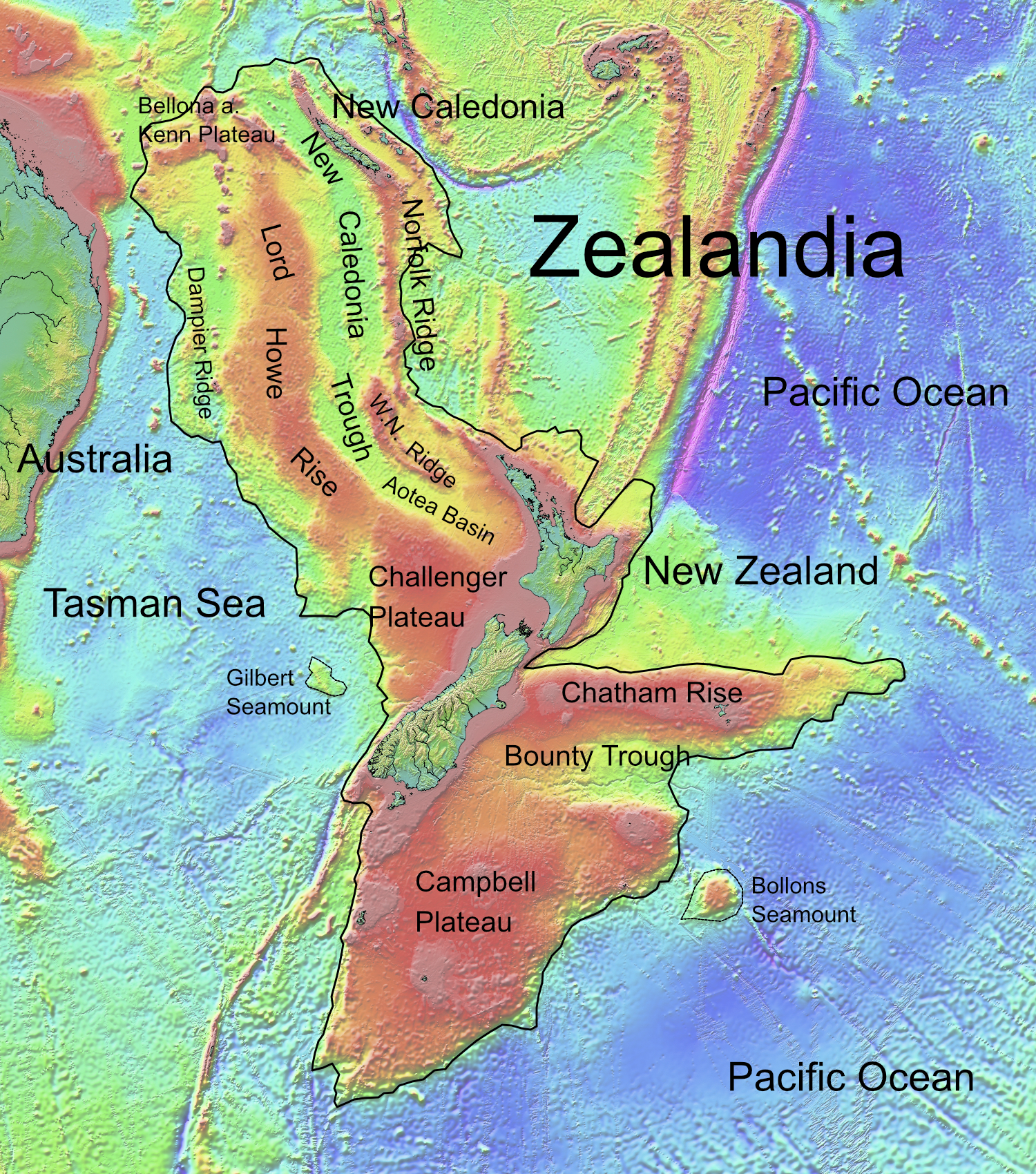
Topographic map of Zealandia

The Zealandia continent is largely made up of two nearly parallel ridges, separated by a failed rift, where the rift breakup of the continent stops and becomes a filled graben. The ridges rise above the sea floor to heights of 1,000–1,500 m (3,300–4,900 ft), with a few rocky islands rising above sea level. The ridges are continental rock, but are lower in elevation than normal continents because their crust is thinner than usual, approximately 20 km (12 mi) thick, and consequently, they do not float so high above Earth's mantle as that of most landmasses.

About 25 million years ago, the southern part of Zealandia (on the Pacific Plate) began to shift relative to the northern part (on the Indo-Australian Plate). The resulting displacement by approximately 500 km (310 mi) along the Alpine Fault is evident in geological maps. Movement along this plate boundary also has offset the New Caledonia Basin from its previous continuation through the Bounty Trough.

Compression across the boundary has uplifted the Southern Alps, although due to rapid erosion their height reflects only a small fraction of the uplift. Farther north, subduction of the Pacific Plate has led to extensive volcanism, including the Coromandel and Taupō Volcanic Zones. Associated rifting and subsidence has produced the Hauraki Rift and more recently, the Whakatane Graben and Wanganui Basin.

=== Volcanism ===
Volcanism on Zealandia has taken place repeatedly in various parts of the continental fragment before, during, and after it rifted away from the supercontinent Gondwana. Although Zealandia has shifted approximately 6,000 km (3,700 mi) to the northwest with respect to the underlying mantle from the time when it rifted from Antarctica, recurring intracontinental volcanism exhibits magma composition similar to that of volcanoes in previously adjacent parts of Antarctica and Australia. Large volume magmatism occurred in two periods, being in the Devonian (370 to 368 million years ago) and the Early Cretaceous (129 to 105 million years ago).

This volcanism is widespread across Zealandia, but on present land generally it is of low volume apart from the huge mid to late Miocene shield volcanoes that developed the Banks and Otago Peninsulas. In addition, it took place continually in numerous limited regions all through the Late Cretaceous and the Cenozoic. Some of its causes remain in dispute perhaps because of data gaps. During the Miocene, the northern section of Zealandia (Lord Howe Rise) might have slid over a stationary hotspot, forming the Lord Howe Seamount Chain.

It has been suggested that Zealandia may have played an important part in the origin of the Pacific Ocean's volcanic Ring of Fire.

=== Geological subdivisions ===
Occasionally, Zealandia is divided into two regions by scientists: North Zealandia (or Western Province); and South Zealandia (or Eastern Province), the latter of which contains most of the Median Batholith crust. These two features are separated by the Alpine Fault and Kermadec Trench and by the wedge-shaped Hikurangi Plateau, and they are moving separately from each other.

=== Classification as a continent ===
The case for Zealandia being a continent in its own right has been argued in the Nick Mortimer and Hamish Campbell book Zealandia: Our continent revealed (2014), in which the authors presented geological and ecological evidence in support of their thesis.

In 2017, a team of eleven geologists from New Zealand, New Caledonia, and Australia concluded that Zealandia fulfills all the requirements to be considered a submerged continent, rather than a microcontinent or continental fragment. This verdict was widely covered in the news media.

=== Oldest parent rocks ===
The younger Zealandia rocks have evidence of origins from early Gondwana formations of 500 to 700 million years ago, Rodinia formations about a billion years ago and sources from an expanded-Ur continent between 3.5 and 2 billion years ago.

=== Tectonics ===
The breakup of Gondwana formed Northern Zealandia. Zealandia underwent extension resulting from east to northeast-directed rollback of west to southwest-dipping subduction of the Pacific Plate, which terminated between 95 million to 85 million years ago. After 85 million years ago Zealandia separated from Australia through seafloor spreading of the Coral and Tasman seas until this ceased 52 million years ago. Shortening on an active convergent northern margin of Zealandia occurred mainly between 45 and 35 million years ago. This was followed by the opening of the backarc basins of the southwest Pacific and the migration of the Tonga and Kermadec Trenchs to the east. Shear extrusion followed between 23.3 million to 5 million years ago with the New Zealand Alpine Fault rupture and a southwestward extension of the Campbell Plateau relative to the Challenger Plateau. Southeast Indian Ocean Ridge expansion movement completely separated Zealandia from the Antarctic at about 10 million years ago. In the last 5 million years Zealandia has been generally subsiding owing to the Pacific Plate subducting westward and retreating eastward.

== Biogeography ==
New Caledonia is at the northern end of the ancient continent, while New Zealand rises at the plate boundary that bisects it. These land masses constitute two outposts of the Antarctic flora, featuring araucarias and podocarps. At Curio Bay, logs of a fossilized forest closely related to modern kauri and Norfolk pine can be seen that grew on Zealandia approximately 180 million years ago during the Jurassic period, before it split from Gondwana. The trees growing in these forests were buried by volcanic mud flows and gradually replaced by silica to produce the fossils now exposed by the sea.

As sea levels drop during glacial periods, more of Zealandia becomes a terrestrial environment rather than a marine environment. Originally, it was thought that Zealandia had no native land mammal fauna, but the discovery in 2006 of a fossil mammal jaw from the Miocene in the Otago region demonstrates otherwise.

== Political divisions ==
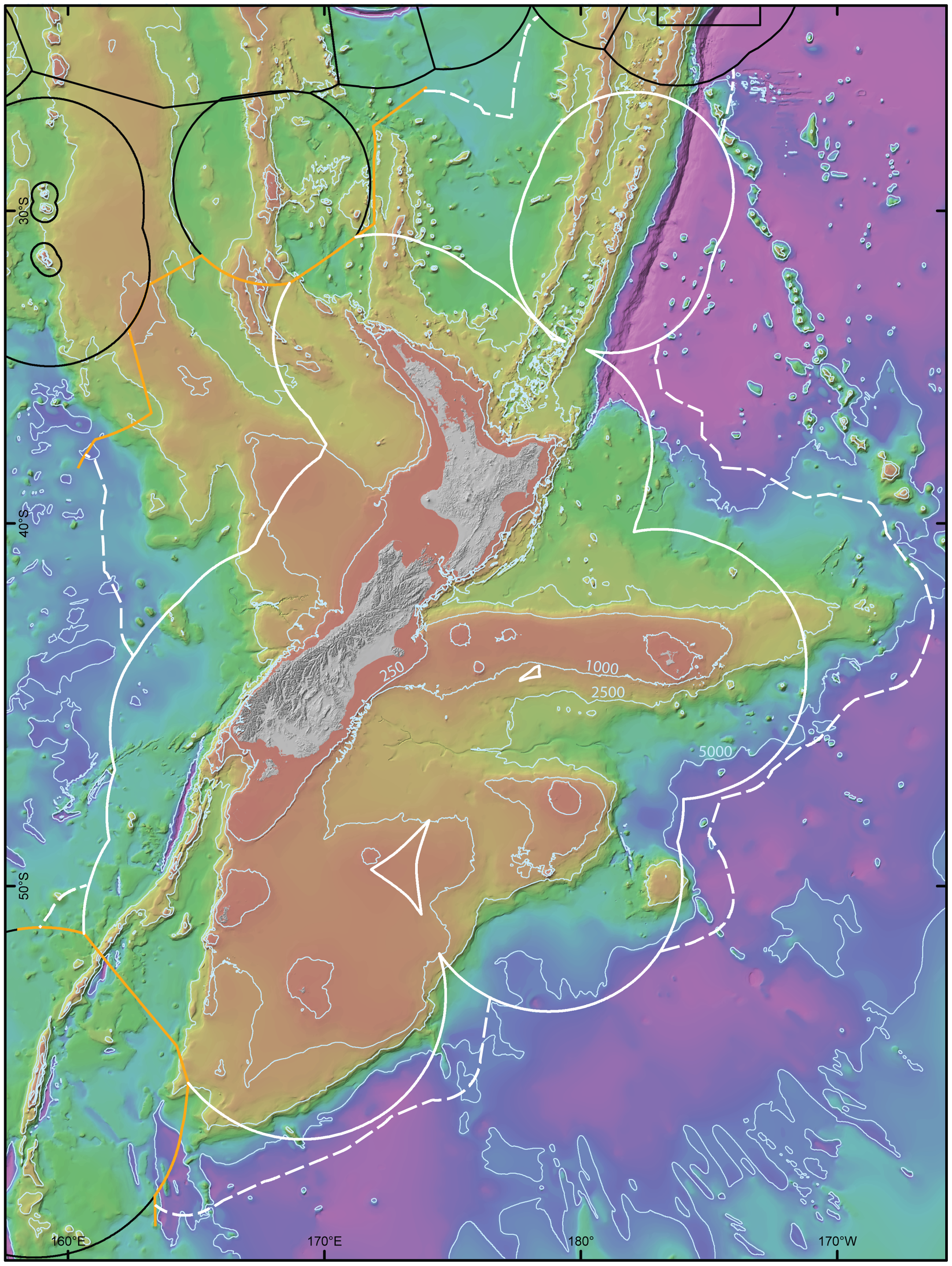
Exclusive economic zone of New Zealand and continental shelf boundaries for much of Zealandia

The total land area (including inland water bodies) of Zealandia is 286,660.25 km^{2} (110,680.14 sq mi). Of this, New Zealand comprises the overwhelming majority, at 267,988 km^{2} (103,471 sq mi, or 93.49%) that includes the mainland (North Island and South Island), the nearby islands, and most outlying islands, including the Chatham Islands, the New Zealand Subantarctic Islands, the Solander Islands, and the Three Kings Islands (but not the Kermadec Islands or Macquarie Island (Australia), which are parts of the rift).

New Caledonia and the islands surrounding it comprise some 18,576 km^{2} (7,172 sq mi or 6.48%) and the remainder is made up of various territories of Australia including the Lord Howe Island Group (New South Wales) at 56 km^{2} (22 sq mi or 0.02%), Norfolk Island at 35 km^{2} (14 sq mi or 0.01%), as well as the Cato, Elizabeth, and Middleton reefs (the Coral Sea Islands Territory) with 5.25 km^{2} (2.03 sq mi).

== Population ==
As of 2024, the total human population of Zealandia is approximately 5.4 million people. The largest city is Auckland with about 1.7 million people; roughly one-third of the total population of the submerged continent.

- New Zealand – 5,112,300
- New Caledonia (France) – 268,767
- Norfolk Island (Australia) – 1,748
- (New South Wales) Lord Howe Island Group (Australia) – 382
- (Coral Sea Islands) Cato Reef (Australia) – 0
- (Coral Sea Islands) Elizabeth Reef (Australia) – 0
- (Coral Sea Islands) Middleton Reef (Australia) – 0

== See also ==
- Australia (continent)
- Exclusive economic zone of New Zealand
- New Zealand Subantarctic Islands
