= List of gastropods described in 2016 =

This list of gastropods described in 2016 is a list of new taxa of snails and slugs of every kind that have been described (following the rules of the ICZN) during the year 2016. The list only includes taxa at the level of genus or species. For changes in taxonomy above the level of genus, see Changes in the taxonomy of gastropods since 2005.

== Marine gastropods ==
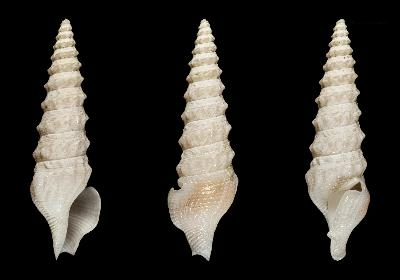
Holotype of Agladrillia torquata

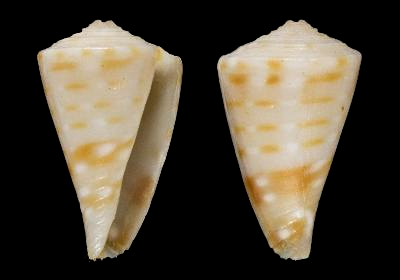
Holotype of Profundiconus barazeri

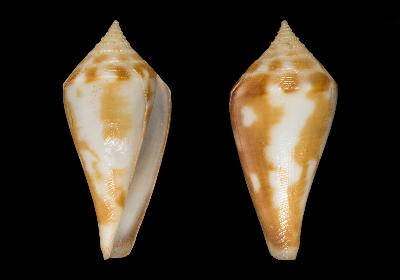
Holotype of Profundiconus limpalaeri

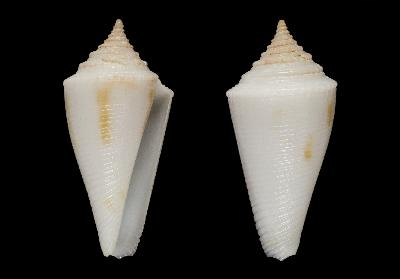
Holotype of Profundiconus maribelae

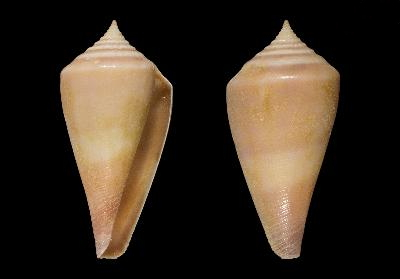
Holotype of Profundiconus neocaledonicus

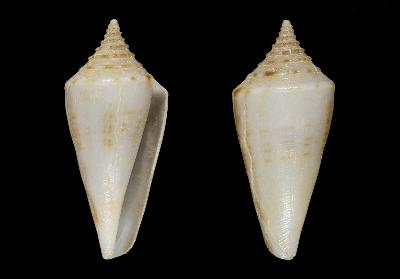
Holotype of Profundiconus robmoolenbeeki

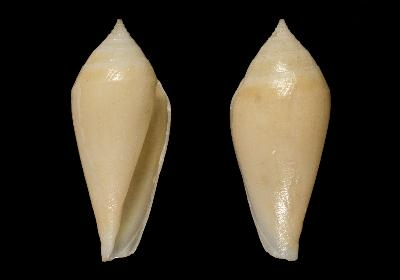
Holotype of Profundiconus puillandrei

- Aforia obesa Pastorino & Sánchez, 2016
- Aforia watsoni Kantor, Harasewych & Puillandre, 2016
- Agladrillia aureola Fallon Jr., 2016
- Agladrillia torquata Fallon Jr., 2016
- Amoria stricklandi Bail & Limpus, 2016
- Ancilla atimovatae Kantor, Fedosov, Puillandre & Bouchet, 2016
- Ancilla kaviengensis Kantor, Fedosov, Puillandre & Bouchet, 2016
- Ancilla lhaumeti Kantor, Fedosov, Puillandre & Bouchet, 2016
- Ancilla morrisoni Kantor, Fedosov, Puillandre & Bouchet, 2016
- Angaria neocaledonica Günther, 2016
- Angaria rubrovaria Günther, 2016
- Angaria scalospinosa Günther, 2016
- Argeneuthria varicosa Pastorino, 2016
- Atlanta ariejansseni Wall-Palmer, Burridge & Peijnenburg, 2016
- Attiliosa eosae Espinosa & Ortea, 2016
- Bathyhedyle boucheti Neusser, Jörger, Lodde-Bensch, Strong & Schrödl, 2016
- Bayerotrochus delicatus Zhang, Zhang & Wei, 2016
- Bellaspira amplicostata Fallon Jr., 2016
- Bellaspira aurantiaca Fallon Jr., 2016
- Bellaspira barbadensis Fallon Jr., 2016
- Calyptoliva bbugeae Kantor, Fedosov, Puillandre & Bouchet, 2016
- Ceratia francisca Lima, Júnior, Guimarães & Dominguez, 2016
- Ceratia sergipana Lima, Júnior, Guimarães & Dominguez, 2016
- Clithon cryptum Eichhorst, 2016
- Clithon teres Eichhorst, 2016
- Conomodulus neocaledonensis Lozouet & Krygelmans, 2016
- Conus guanahacabibensis Espinosa & Ortea, 2016
- Conus molaerivus Dekkers, 2016
- Cribrarula boninensis Simone & Takashigue, 2016
- Cuspivolva singaporica Fehse & Koh, 2016
- Cuthona luciae Valdés, Medrano & Bhave, 2016
- Cuvierina tsudai Burridge, Janssen & Peijnenburg, 2016
- Dendronotus arcticus Korshunova, Sanamyan, Zimina, Fletcher & Martynov, 2016
- Dendronotus dudkai Ekimova, Schepetov, Chichvarkhina & Chichvarkhin, 2016
- Dendronotus robilliardi Korshunova, Sanamyan, Zimina, Fletcher & Martynov, 2016
- Desbruyeresia chamorrensis Chen, Ogura & Okutani in Chen et al., 2016
- Diodora giannispadai Assaoui, Puillandre & Bouchet, 2016
- Doris ananas Lima, Tibiriçá & Simone, 2016
- Doto carinova Moles, Avila & Wägele, 2016
- Drilliola antarctica Kantor, Harasewych & Puillandre, 2016
- Entocolax olgae Nekhaev, 2016
- Epidendrium parvitrochoides Nakayama in Nakayama & Hasegawa, 2016
- Erato africana Fehse, 2016
- Falsimargarita callista Marshall, 2016
- Falsimargarita challengerica Marshall, 2016
- Falsimargarita coriolis Marshall, 2016
- Falsimargarita eximia Marshall, 2016
- Falsimargarita kapala Marshall, 2016
- Falsimargarita tangaroa Marshall, 2016
- Favartia mariagordae Espinosa & Ortea, 2016
- Ficus schneideri Morrison, 2016
- Fusinus angeli Russo & Angelidis, 2016
- Fusinus damasoi Petuch & Berschauer, 2016
- Fusinus mariaodeteae Petuch & Berschauer, 2016
- Haliotis arabiensis Owen, Regter & Van Laethem, 2016
- Harpa queenslandica Berschauer & Petuch, 2016
- Hastulopsis masirahensis Terryn & Rosado, 2016
- Hastulopsis mirbatensis Terryn & Rosado, 2016
- Hermaea conejera Ortea, Moro & Caballer, 2016
- Hoplodoris madibenthos Ortea, 2016
- Hyalina saintjames Ortea & Espinosa, 2016
- Impages anosyana Bozzetti, 2016
- Inbiocystiscus tanialeonae Ortea & Espinosa, 2016
- Intelcystiscus teresacarrenoae Ortea & Espinosa, 2016
- Janolus gelidus Millen, 2016
- Jaspidiconus boriqua Petuch, Berschauer & Poremski, 2016
- Jaspidiconus culebranus Petuch, Berschauer & Poremski, 2016
- Jaspidiconus janapatriceae Petuch, Berschauer & Poremski, 2016
- Jaspidiconus josei Petuch & Berschauer, 2016
- Jaspidiconus marcusi Petuch, Berschauer & Poremski, 2016
- Jaspidiconus masinoi Petuch, Berschauer & Poremski, 2016
- Jujubinus errinae Smriglio, Mariottini & Giacobbe, 2016
- Kanoia myronfeinbergi Warén & Rouse, 2016
- Lamniconus petestimpsoni Petuch & Berschauer, 2016
- Lautoconus saharicus Petuch & Berschauer, 2016
- Lepetella furuncula Lima, Guimarães & Simone, 2016
- Leporicypraea rosea singularis Lorenz, 2016
- Lophiotoma natalensis
- Meteuthria batialis Pastorino, 2016
- Metula sulcata Zhang, Zhang & Zhang, 2016
- Miliariconus sinaiensis Petuch & Berschauer, 2016
- Mitra stossieri Herrmann, 2016
- Monostiolum simonei Watters, 2016
- Monstrotyphis takashigei Houart & Chino, 2016
- Murexiella hebeae Espinosa & Ortea, 2016
- Murexiella jacquesi Espinosa & Ortea, 2016
- Murexsul apollo Espinosa & Ortea, 2016
- Murexsul cubacaribaensis Espinosa & Ortea, 2016
- Nassarius thachorum Dekker, Kool & van Gemert, 2016
- Nereina cresswelli Eichhorst, 2016
- Nerita grasi Eichhorst, 2016
- Neripteron subviolaceum Eichhorst, 2016
- Niveria bieleri Fehse & Grego, 2016
- Niveria guyana Fehse, 2016
- Niveria simonei Fehse, 2016
- Oliva kohi Hunon, Rabiller & Richard, 2016
- Phalium evdoxiae Morrison, 2016
- Phenacomargarites incomptus Marshall, 2016
- Phenacomargarites titan Marshall, 2016
- Phenacomargarites williamsae Marshall, 2016
- Philine baxteri Valdés, Cadien & Gosliner, 2016
- Philine harrisae Valdés, Cadien & Gosliner, 2016
- Philine malaquiasi Valdés, Cadien & Gosliner, 2016
- Philine mcleani Valdés, Cadien & Gosliner, 2016
- Philine wareni Valdés, Cadien & Gosliner, 2016
- Pionoconus quasimagus
- Pirenella arabica Reid in Reid & Ozawa, 2016
- Pirenella asiatica Ozawa & Reid in Reid & Ozawa, 2016
- Pirenella austrocingulata Reid in Reid & Ozawa, 2016
- Pirenella cancellata Ozawa & Reid in Reid & Ozawa, 2016
- Pirenella delicatula Reid in Reid & Ozawa, 2016
- Pirenella nanhaiensis Fu & Reid in Reid & Ozawa, 2016
- Pirenella nipponica Ozawa & Reid in Reid & Ozawa, 2016
- Pirenella pupiformis Ozawa & Reid in Reid & Ozawa, 2016
- Pirenella rugosa Reid in Reid & Ozawa, 2016
- Plakobranchus papua Meyers-Muñoz & van der Velde in Meyers-Muñoz, van der Velde, van der Meij, Stoffels, van Alen, Tuti & Hoeksema, 2016
- Plesiocystiscus jardonae Ortea & Espinosa, 2016
- Pleurotomella petiti Kantor, Harasewych & Puillandre, 2016
- Pleurotomella tippetti Kantor, Harasewych & Puillandre, 2016
- Poremskiconus fonsecai Petuch & Berschauer, 2016
- Poremskiconus smoesi Petuch & Berschauer, 2016
- Provanna cingulata Chen, Watanabe & Ohara, 2016
- Provanna clathrata Sasaki, Ogura, Watanabe & Fujikura, 2016
- Provanna lucida Sasaki, Ogura, Watanabe & Fujikura, 2016
- Provanna kuroshimensis Sasaki, Ogura, Watanabe & Fujikura, 2016
- Provanna subglabra Sasaki, Ogura, Watanabe & Fujikura, 2016
- Profundiconus barazeri Tenorio & Castelin, 2016
- Profundiconus limpalaeri Tenorio & Monnier, 2016
- Profundiconus maribelae Tenorio & Castelin, 2016
- Profundiconus neocaledonicus Tenorio & Castelin, 2016
- Profundiconus puillandrei Tenorio & Castelin, 2016
- Profundiconus robmoolenbeeki Tenorio, 2016
- Profundiconus virginiae Tenorio & Castelin, 2016
- Pterygia morrisoni Marrow, 2016
- Pygmaepterys habanensis Espinosa & Ortea, 2016
- Pygmaepterys tacoensis Espinosa & Ortea, 2016
- Pygmaepterys yemayaensis Espinosa & Ortea, 2016
- Quijote cervantesi Ortea, Moro & Bacallado, 2016
- Raphitoma alida Pusateri & Giannuzzi-Savelli in Pusateri, Giannuzzi-Savelli & Bartolini, 2016
- Raphitoma maculosa Høisaeter, 2016
- Raphitoma obesa Høisaeter, 2016
- Rapturella ryani Salvador & Cunha, 2016
- Retimohnia lussae Kosyan & Kantor, 2016
- Retimohnia mcleani Kosyan & Kantor, 2016
- Rissoina hernandezi Faber & Gori, 2016
- Rissoina mirjamae Faber & Gori, 2016
- Scabricola ivanmarrowi Marrow, 2016
- Sciteconus ariejooste
- Sciteconus nahoonensis
- Sciteconus velliesi
- Sciteconus xhosa
- Severnsia strombeulima Geiger, 2016
- Spiniphiline persei Caballer & Ortea, 2016
- Sulcorissoina stasii Faber & Gori, 2016
- Teinostoma brankovitsi Rubio, Rolán, Worsaae, Martínez & Gonzalez, 2016
- Ticofurcilla maryolisae Ortea, 2016
- Tomura rubiorolanorum Romani & Sbrana, 2016
- Tritonia newfoundlandica Valdés, Murillo, McCarthy & Yedinak, 2016
- Triviella lorenzi Fehse, 2016
- Triviella carptima Fehse, 2016
- Triviella chiapponii Fehse, 2016
- Triviella martybealsi Fehse, 2016
- Triviella montorum Fehse, 2016
- Turbo moolenbeeki Dekker & Dekkers, 2016
- Venustatrochus eclectus Marshall, 2016
- Venustatrochus galatheae Marshall, 2016
- Venustatrochus youngi Marshall, 2016
- Viduoliva tricolor abbasi Thach & Berschauer, 2016
- Xanthodaphne pastorinoi Kantor, Harasewych & Puillandre, 2016
- Zebina moolenbeeki Faber & Gori, 2016
- Zoila venusta morrisoni Lorenz, 2016

Other taxa

- genus Antarctophiline Chaban, 2016
- genus Antarctospira Kantor, Harasewych & Puillandre, 2016
- genus Argeneuthria Pastorino, 2016
- genus Bathyhedyle Neusser, Jörger, Lodde-Bensch, Strong & Schrödl, 2016
- genus Falsimacme Pastorino, 2016
- genus Kanoia Warén & Rouse, 2016
- genus Microdeuthria Pastorino, 2016
- genus Phenacomargarites Marshall, 2016
- genus Quijote Ortea, Moro & Bacallado, 2016
- genus Rapturella Salvador & Cunha, 2016
- genus Severnsia Geiger, 2016

== Freshwater gastropods ==
- Bythinella walensae Falniowski, Hofman & Rysiewska, 2016
- Chilina luciae Gutiérrez Gregoric & de Lucía, 2016
- Chilina nicolasi Gutiérrez Gregoric & de Lucía, 2016
- Chilina santiagoi Gutiérrez Gregoric & de Lucía, 2016
- Cipangopaludina hehuensis Lu, Fang & Du, 2016
- Iglica calepii Niero & Pezzoli, 2016
- Iglica kanalitensis Reischütz, Steiner-Reischütz & Reischütz, 2016
- Myrtoessa hyas Radea in Radea, Parmakelis & Giokas, 2016
- Nicolaia schniebsae Glöer & Bößneck in Glöer, Bößneck, Walther & Neiber, 2016
- Paladilhiopsis prezensis Reischütz, Steiner-Reischütz & Reischütz, 2016
- Pseudobaikalia michelae Sitnikova & Kovalenkova in Sitnikova, Kovalenkova, Peretolchina & Sherbakov, 2016
- Pseudamnicola ianthe Radea & Parmakelis in Radea, Parmakelis, Velentzas & Triantis, 2016
- Pseudamnicola ilione Radea & Parmakelis in Radea, Parmakelis, Velentzas & Triantis, 2016
- Pseudamnicola magdalenae Falniowski, 2016
- Pyrgulopsis hualapaiensis Hershler, Liu & Stevens, 2016
- Shadinia bjniensis Bößneck, Walther & Neiber in Glöer, Bößneck, Walther & Neiber, 2016

Other taxa

- genus Diegus Delicado, Machordom & Ramos, 2016
- genus Intermaria Delicado, Pešić & Glöer, 2016
- genus Myrtoessa Radea in Radea, Parmakelis & Giokas, 2016
- genus Nicolaia Glöer, Bößneck, Walther & Neiber, 2016
- genus Persipyrgula Delicado, Pešić & Glöer, 2016

== Land gastropods ==
- Abbottella crataegus Watters, 2016
- Agardhiella mista Reischütz, Steiner-Reischütz & Reischütz, 2016
- Amphidromus stevenliei Parsons, 2016
- Amphiscopus moolenbeeki Bank, Menkhorst & Neubert, 2016
- Amphiscopus sturmii marmoratus Bank, Menkhorst & Neubert, 2016
- Angustopila singuladentis Inkhavilay & Panha in Inkhavilay, Sutcharit, Tongkerd & Panha, 2016
- Argna szekeresi Reischütz, Steiner-Reischütz & Reischütz, 2016
- Arinia micro Marzuki & Foon, 2016
- Atlasica anflousiana
- Awalycaeus shiosakimasahiroi Yano, Matsuda & Nishi in Yano, Matsuda, Nishi, Kawase & Hayase, 2016
- Awalycaeus yanoshokoae Yano & Matsuda in Yano, Matsuda, Nishi, Kawase & Hayase, 2016
- Bahiensis ribeirensis Salvador, Cavallari & Simone, 2016
- Balcanodiscus mirus Reischütz, Steiner-Reischütz & Reischütz, 2016
- Bathyptychia aplostoma ookuboi Hunyadi & Szekeres, 2016
- Bathyptychia beresowskii eremita Hunyadi & Szekeres, 2016
- Bathyptychia martensi immersa Hunyadi & Szekeres, 2016
- Bathyptychia septentrionalis Nordsieck, 2016
- Bothriembryon sophiarum Whisson & Breure, 2016
- Camaena abbasi Thach, 2016
- Camaena detianensis Zhou & Lin in Ai, Lin, Wang, Zhou & Hwang, 2016
- Camaena lingyunensis Zhou & Lin in Ai, Lin, Wang, Zhou & Hwang, 2016
- Camaena poyuensis Zhou, Wang & Ding in Ding, Wang, Qian, Lin, Zhou, Hwang & Ai, 2016
- Caracolus cimarron Espinosa, Fernández-Velázquez & Ortea, 2016
- Clausilioides berendinae Bank, Menkhorst & Neubert, 2016
- Clausilioides palatalis Bank, Menkhorst & Neubert, 2016
- Cochlodinella pinera Herrera-Uria, Espinosa & Ortea, 2016
- Cochlodinella pirata Herrera-Uria, Espinosa & Ortea, 2016
- Discartemon moolenbeeki Maassen, 2016
- Entadella entadiformis Páll-Gergely & Hunyadi in Páll-Gergely, Hunyadi, Otani & Asami, 2016
- Euchondrus adwani Neubert & Amr, 2016
- Euphaedusa latens Hunyadi & Szekeres, 2016
- Euphaedusa sericea Hunyadi & Szekeres, 2016
- Formosana abscedens Hunyadi & Szekeres, 2016
- Fruticocampylaea tushetica Walther, Neiber & Hausdorf, 2016
- Geminula dolmenensis Bank & Neubert, 2016
- Geminula pyramidata Bank & Neubert, 2016
- Geminula urmiensis Bank & Neubert, 2016
- Glyphyalus quillensis de Winter, van Leeuwen & Hovestadt, 2016
- Gonyostomus elinae Simone, 2016
- Grandinenia crassilabris Nordsieck, 2016
- Grandinenia rutila Nordsieck, 2016
- Grandinenia pallidissima ooharai Hunyadi & Szekeres, 2016
- Gudeoconcha sophiae intermedia Hyman & Ponder, 2016
- Gudeodiscus longiplica Páll-Gergely & Asami, 2016
- Gulella davisae Herbert, 2016
- Gulella hadroglossa Herbert, 2016
- Gyliotrachela plesiolopa Inkhavilay & Panha in Inkhavilay, Sutcharit, Tongkerd & Panha, 2016
- Helicopsis persica Hausdorf & Bössneck, 2016
- Hemiphaedusa ptycholunella Nordsieck, 2016
- Hunyadiscus saurini Páll-Gergely in Páll-Gergely, Muratov & Asami, 2016
- Imparietula inflexa Bank, Menkhorst & Neubert, 2016
- Iranopsis granulata Bank & Neubert, 2016
- Kora rupestris Salvador & Simone, 2016
- Leiostracus carnavalescus Simone & Salvador, 2016
- Leiostyla eikenboomi Bank, Menkhorst & Neubert, 2016
- Leiostyla paphlagonica subangulosa Bank, Menkhorst & Neubert, 2016
- Liocallonia torrebartschi Herrera-Uria & Espinosa, 2016
- Lithocouperia kalkajaka Stanisic, 2016
- Ljudmilena callosa Bank, Menkhorst & Neubert, 2016
- Ljudmilena mariannae Bank, Menkhorst & Neubert, 2016
- Lorelliana hoskini Stanisic, 2016
- Megavitrina imperatoria Bank, Menkhorst & Neubert, 2016
- Minatoia inopinata Hunyadi & Szekeres, 2016
- Miraphaedusa gregoi Hunyadi & Szekeres, 2016
- Montenegrina grammica erosszoltani Fehér & Szekeres, 2016
- Montenegrina grammica improvisa Fehér & Szekeres, 2016
- Montenegrina haringae Fehér & Szekeres, 2016
- Montenegrina hiltrudae desaretica Fehér & Szekeres, 2016
- Montenegrina hiltrudae selcensis Fehér & Szekeres, 2016
- Montenegrina laxa delii Fehér & Szekeres, 2016
- Montenegrina lillae Fehér & Szekeres, 2016
- Montenegrina nana barinai Fehér & Szekeres, 2016
- Montenegrina prokletiana prokletiana Fehér & Szekeres, 2016
- Montenegrina prokletiana kovacsorum Fehér & Szekeres, 2016
- Montenegrina rugilabris golikutensis Fehér & Szekeres, 2016
- Montenegrina rugilabris gregoi Fehér & Szekeres, 2016
- Montenegrina skipetarica danyii Fehér & Szekeres, 2016
- Montenegrina skipetarica gurelurensis Fehér & Szekeres, 2016
- Montenegrina skipetarica pifkoi Fehér & Szekeres, 2016
- Montenegrina skipetarica puskasi Fehér & Szekeres, 2016
- Montenegrina sporadica tropojana Fehér & Szekeres, 2016
- Montenegrina sturanyana sturanyana Fehér & Szekeres, 2016
- Montenegrina sturanyana gropana Fehér & Szekeres, 2016
- Montenegrina sturanyana ostrovicensis Fehér & Szekeres, 2016
- Montenegrina tomorosi hunyadii Fehér & Szekeres, 2016
- Multidentula reducta Bank, Menkhorst & Neubert, 2016
- Muticaria cyclopica Liberto, Reitano, Giglio, Colomba & Sparacio, 2016
- Myxostoma petiverianum tenggolensis Foon, 2016
- Nata aequiplicata Herbert & Moussalli, 2016
- Nata erugata Herbert & Moussalli, 2016
- Nata watsoni Herbert & Moussalli, 2016
- Obeliscus boitata Simone & Salvador, 2016
- Obelus zarzaensis Neiber, Walther, Santana, Alonso & Ibáñez, 2016
- Oospira antilopina antilopa Nordsieck, 2016
- Oospira duci pentaptychia Nordsieck, 2016
- Oospira duci tetraptychia Nordsieck, 2016
- Oospira eregia christae Nordsieck, 2016
- Oospira goniostoma Nordsieck, 2016
- Oospira jensi Nordsieck, 2016
- Oospira minutissima Hunyadi & Szekeres, 2016
- Oospira ootayoshinarii Hunyadi & Szekeres, 2016
- Oospira pacifica decapitata Nordsieck, 2016
- Oospira splendens amphicola Nordsieck, 2016
- Oospira truncatula Hunyadi & Szekeres, 2016
- Oxyloma sarsii tulomica Schikov & Nekhaev, 2016
- Paraboysidia anguloobtusus Inkhavilay & Panha in Inkhavilay, Sutcharit, Tongkerd & Panha, 2016
- Paraboysidia paralella Inkhavilay & Panha in Inkhavilay, Sutcharit, Tongkerd & Panha, 2016
- Parachondria anatolensis Watters, 2016
- Parachondria arcisensis Watters, 2016
- Parachondria daedalus Watters, 2016
- Parachondria heatheraikenae Watters, 2016
- Parachondria isabellinus Watters, 2016
- Parachondria joyeuse Watters, 2016
- Parachondria muchai Watters, 2016
- Parachondria silvaticus Watters, 2016
- Parachondria stigmosus Watters, 2016
- Parmellops perspicuus Hyman & Ponder, 2016
- Phaedusa matejkoi ooharai Hunyadi & Szekeres, 2016
- Phaedusa percostata Nordsieck, 2016
- Plagiodontes parodizi Pizá & Cazzaniga, 2016
- Platyla ceraunorum Reischütz, Steiner-Reischütz & Reischütz, 2016
- Pseudochondrula arsaci Bank & Neubert, 2016
- Pseudochondrula bondouxi Bank & Neubert, 2016
- Pseudochondrula darii Bank & Neubert, 2016
- Pseudochondrula orientalis Bank & Neubert, 2016
- Pseudonapaeus alborsicus Bank & Neubert, 2016
- Pseudonapaeus demorgani Bank & Neubert, 2016
- Pseudonapaeus fusiformis Bank & Neubert, 2016
- Pseudonapaeus ignoratus Bank & Neubert, 2016
- Pseudonapaeus kermanensis Bank & Neubert, 2016
- Pseudonapaeus menkhorsti Bank & Neubert, 2016
- Pseudonapaeus minutus Bank & Neubert, 2016
- Pseudonapaeus orculoides Bank & Neubert, 2016
- Ptilototheca soutpansbergensis Herbert, 2016
- Ptychauchenia panhai euclista Nordsieck, 2016
- Quistrachia nevbrownlowi Stanisic, 2016
- Reticularopa minjerribah Stanisic, 2016
- Rhinus botocudus Simone & Salvador, 2016
- Sciocochlea cryptica harli Reischütz, Reischütz & Szekeres, 2016
- Selenophaedusa dentifera Hunyadi & Szekeres, 2016
- Serriphaedusa diaphana Hunyadi & Szekeres, 2016
- Serriphaedusa fusiformis Hunyadi & Szekeres, 2016
- Serriphaedusa ishibei Hunyadi & Szekeres, 2016
- Serriphaedusa ootanii Hunyadi & Szekeres, 2016
- Serriphaedusa pseudookuboi Nordsieck, 2016
- Serriphaedusa serrata emeicola Nordsieck, 2016
- Serriphaedusa serrata sericina Nordsieck, 2016
- Setobaudinia nicolasi Criscione & Köhler, 2016
- Sheldonia monsmaripi Herbert, 2016
- Sheldonia wolkbergensis Herbert, 2016
- Siciliaria calcarae orlandoi Liberto, Reitano, Giglio, Colomba & Sparacio, 2016
- Sinoennea euryomphala Inkhavilay & Panha in Inkhavilay, Sutcharit, Tongkerd & Panha, 2016
- Sinoennea reischuetzorum Maassen, 2016
- Sphendone insolita Slapcinsky & Kraus, 2016
- Synprosphyma aegrota Hunyadi & Szekeres, 2016
- Synprosphyma basilissa ishibei Hunyadi & Szekeres, 2016
- Synprosphyma gibbosula basalifera Nordsieck, 2016
- Synprosphyma hosodai Hunyadi & Szekeres, 2016
- Synprosphyma incrustata Nordsieck, 2016
- Synprosphyma ookuboi Hunyadi & Szekeres, 2016
- Synprosphyma pallgergelyi Hunyadi & Szekeres, 2016
- Synprosphyma wanshinensis monachorum Hunyadi & Szekeres, 2016
- Tetrentodon jaumei Herrera-Uria & Espinosa, 2016
- Theba pisana almogravensis Holyoak & Holyoak, 2016
- Tropidauchenia mengyuanensis
- Truncatellina algoviana Colling & Karle-Fendt, 2016
- Tsoukatosia argolica Reischütz, Reischütz & Szekeres, 2016
- Tsoukatosia nicolae Reischütz, Reischütz & Szekeres, 2016
- Tsoukatosia pallgergelyi Reischütz, Reischütz & Szekeres, 2016
- Tudora paraguanensis Hovestadt, 2016
- Turanena andonakii salpinx Bank, Menkhorst & Neubert, 2016
- Turanena elegantula Bank, Menkhorst & Neubert, 2016
- Turanena pseudobscura Bank & Neubert, 2016
- Vargapupa humilis Páll-Gergely, 2016
- Xanthomelon arnhemense Köhler & Burghardt, 2016
- Xanthomelon darwinense Köhler & Burghardt, 2016
- Xeroleuca pallaryi

Other taxa

- subgenus Aegaeotheba Neiber & Hausdorf, 2016
- genus Anatolya Páll-Gergely & Bank, 2016
- subgenus Campylaea (Oricampylaea) Groenenberg, Subai & Gittenberger, 2016
- genus Chordaropa Stanisic, 2016
- genus Entadella Páll-Gergely & Hunyadi in Páll-Gergely, Hunyadi, Otani & Asami, 2016
- genus Graniberia Gittenberger, Groenenberg & Kokshoorn in Gittenberger, Kokshoorn, Bößneck, Reijnen & Groenenberg, 2016
- subgenus Grohiellus Neiber, Walther, Santana, Alonso & Ibáñez, 2016
- genus Hunyadiscus Páll-Gergely in Páll-Gergely, Muratov & Asami, 2016
- genus Kollarix Groenenberg, Subai & Gittenberger, 2016
- genus Lithocouperia Stanisic, 2016
- genus Lorelliana Stanisic, 2016
- genus Megavitrina Bank, Menkhorst & Neubert, 2016
- genus Minatoia Hunyadi & Szekeres, 2016
- genus Mordaniella Bank & Neubert, 2016
- genus Naggsia Páll-Gergely & Muratov in Páll-Gergely, Muratov & Asami, 2016
- subgenus Pontotheba Neiber & Hausdorf, 2016
- genus Pseudojaminia Páll-Gergely & Bank, 2016
- genus Pseudotrizona Groenenberg, Subai & Gittenberger, 2016
- genus Ptilototheca Herbert, 2016
- genus Reticularopa Stanisic, 2016
- subgenus Rhytidotheba Neiber & Hausdorf, 2016
- genus Sphendone Slapcinsky & Kraus, 2016
- subgenus Trichotheba Neiber & Hausdorf, 2016

== See also ==
- List of gastropods described in 2015
- List of gastropods described in 2017
