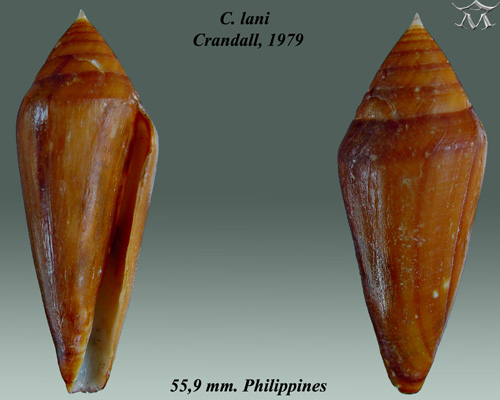
- Apertural and abapertural views of shell of Profundiconus lani (Crandall, 1979)

Scientific classification
- Kingdom: Animalia
- Phylum: Mollusca
- Class: Gastropoda
- Subclass: Caenogastropoda
- Order: Neogastropoda
- Superfamily: Conoidea
- Family: Conidae
- Genus: Profundiconus; Kuroda, 1956

Type species
- Chelyconus profundorum Kuroda, 1956

Synonyms
- Conus (Profundiconus) Kuroda, 1956; Lizaconus da Motta, 1991

= Profundiconus =

Profundiconus Temporal range: Eocene–Recent

Genus of gastropods

Profundiconus is a genus of sea snails, marine gastropod mollusks in the family Conidae, the cone snails and their allies.

As the name of the genus suggests, these species live in deep water. It is presumed that they are vermivorous.

This genus is the type genus of the subfamily Profundiconinae Limpalaër & Monnier, 2018. This is an alternate representation for the family Conidae.

== Species ==
- Profundiconus barazeri Tenorio & Castelin, 2016
- Profundiconus cakobaui (Moolenbeek, Röckel & Bouchet, 2008)
- Profundiconus dondani (Kosuge, 1981)
- Profundiconus emersoni (Hanna, 1963)
- Profundiconus frausseni (Tenorio & Poppe, 2004)
- † Profundiconus hennigi Hendricks, 2015
- Profundiconus ikedai (Ninomiya, 1987)
- Profundiconus jeanmartini G. Raybaudi Massilia, 1992
- Profundiconus kanakinus (Richard, 1983)
- Profundiconus lani (Crandall, 1979)
- Profundiconus limpalaeri Tenorio & Monnier, 2016
- Profundiconus loyaltiensis (Röckel & Moolenbeek, 1995)
- Profundiconus maribelae Tenorio & Castelin, 2016
- Profundiconus neocaledonicus Tenorio & Castelin, 2016
- Profundiconus neotorquatus (da Motta, 1985)
- Profundiconus pacificus (Moolenbeek & Röckel, 1996)
- Profundiconus profundorum (Kuroda, 1956)
- Profundiconus puillandrei Tenorio & Castelin, 2016
- Profundiconus rashafunensis Bozzetti, 2021
- Profundiconus robmoolenbeeki Tenorio, 2016
- Profundiconus scopulicola Okutani, 1972
- Profundiconus smirna (Bartsch & Rehder, 1943)
- Profundiconus smirnoides Tenorio, 2015
- Profundiconus stahlschmidti Tenorio & Tucker, 2014
- Profundiconus tarava (Rabiller & Richard, 2014)
- Profundiconus teramachii (Kuroda, 1956)
- Profundiconus tuberculosus (Tomlin, 1937)
- Profundiconus vaubani (Röckel & Moolenbeek, 1995)
- Profundiconus virginiae Tenorio & Castelin, 2016
- Profundiconus weii Lorenz & Barbier, 2019
- Profundiconus zardoyai Tenorio, 2015

Species brought into synonymy

- Profundiconus bayeri (Petuch, 1987): synonym of Conus bayeri Petuch, 1987
- Profundiconus darkini (Röckel, Korn & Richard, 1993) represented as Conus darkini Röckel, Korn & Richard, 1993 (alternate representation)
- Profundiconus luciae (Moolenbeek, 1986) represented as Conus luciae Moolenbeek, 1986 (alternate representation)
- Profundiconus soyomaruae Okutani, 1964: synonym of Conus profundorum (Kuroda, 1956), synonym of Profundiconus profundorum (Kuroda, 1956)
