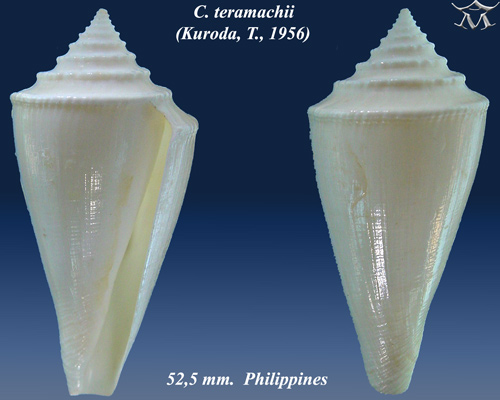
- Apertural and abapertural views of shell of Profundiconus teramachii (Kuroda, T., 1956)
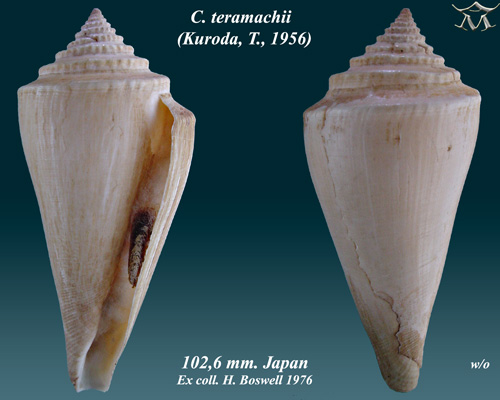

Conservation status
- Least Concern (IUCN 3.1)

Scientific classification
- Kingdom: Animalia
- Phylum: Mollusca
- Class: Gastropoda
- Subclass: Caenogastropoda
- Order: Neogastropoda
- Superfamily: Conoidea
- Family: Conidae
- Genus: Profundiconus
- Species: P. teramachii

Binomial name
- Profundiconus teramachii (Kuroda, 1956)

Synonyms
- Asprella (Endemoconus) teramachii Kuroda, 1956 (basionym); Asprella teramachii Kuroda, 1956; Conus teramachii (Kuroda, 1956); Conus torquatus Martens, 1901 (invalid: junior secondary homonym of Cucullus torquatus Röding, 1798; Conus neotorquatus is a replacement name); Conus (Profundiconus) tarava Rabiller & Richard, 2014 accepted, alternate designation; Leptoconus teramachii (Kuroda, 1956)

= Profundiconus teramachii =

Species of gastropod

Profundiconus teramachii, common name Teramachi's cone, is a species of sea snail, a marine gastropod mollusk in the family Conidae, the cone snails and their allies.

Like all species within the genus Profundiconus, these cone snails are predatory and venomous. They are capable of stinging humans, therefore live ones should be handled carefully or not at all.

== Description ==
The size of the shell varies between 50 mm and 115 mm. Their elegant high-spired shapes are highly valued by collectors. Named after Akibumi Teramachi, a famous Japanese shell collector, its scientific holotype originally came from his collection.

== Distribution ==
This marine species occurs from Southeast Africa and the Philippines to Southern Japan, and off Queensland, Australia; also on the Tarava Seamounts off Tahiti.

== Habitat ==
Sometimes trawled in deep water on mud.
