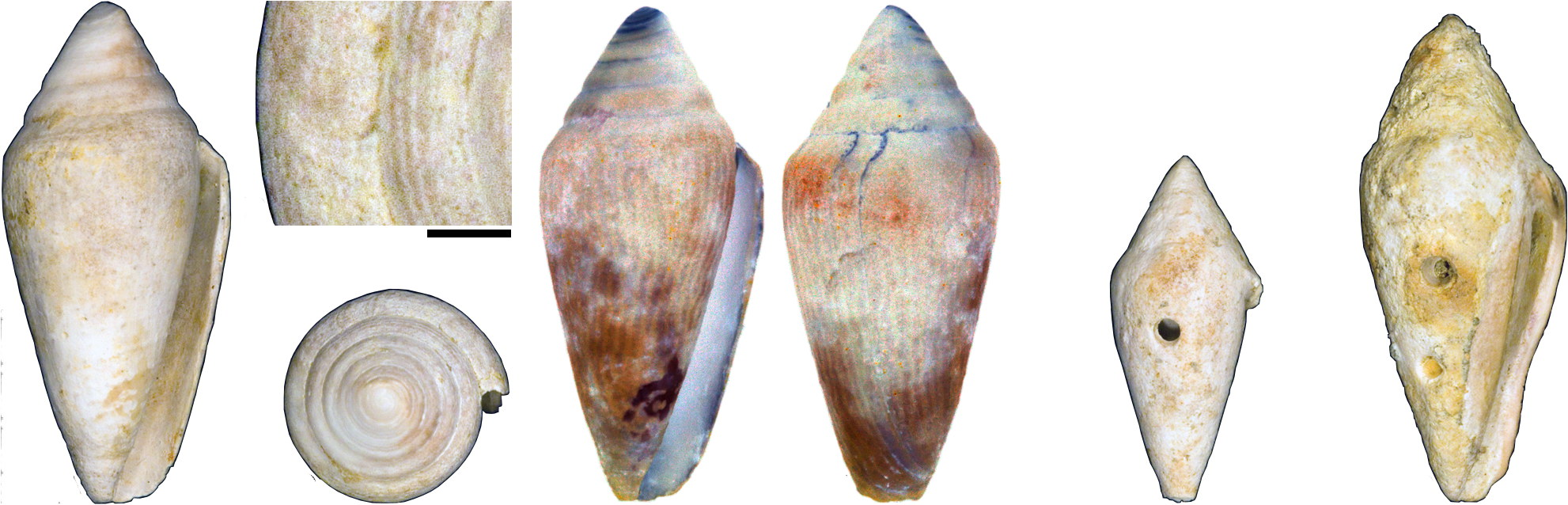
- Several views of a shell of Profundiconus hennigi; the four images on the right are reversed images of the holotype photographed under UV light

Scientific classification
- Kingdom: Animalia
- Phylum: Mollusca
- Class: Gastropoda
- Subclass: Caenogastropoda
- Order: Neogastropoda
- Superfamily: Conoidea
- Family: Conidae
- Genus: Profundiconus
- Species: P. hennigi

Binomial name
- Profundiconus hennigi Hendricks, 2015

= Profundiconus hennigi =

Extinct species of gastropod

Profundiconus hennigi is an extinct species of sea snail (a marine gastropod mollusc) in the genus Profundiconius, in the family Conidae, the cone snails and their allies.

== Description ==
The species is described from a 2015 fossil specimen and added to the genus based on color and morphological similarities to Profundiconus lani, though the high spire on its shell is more similar to Conus bellacoensis. The assignment to the current genus is disputed. The size of the shell varies between 17.6 mm and 25.5 mm.

== Distribution ==
This proposed fossil cone snail is the only one of its genus found in the Neogene of the Dominican Republic.
