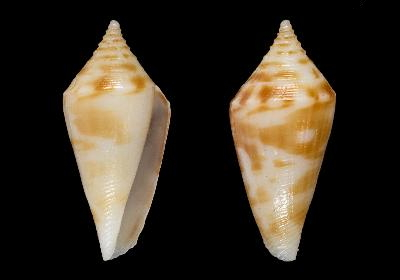
- Shell of Profundiconus cakobaui (holotype in MNHN, Paris)

Scientific classification
- Kingdom: Animalia
- Phylum: Mollusca
- Class: Gastropoda
- Subclass: Caenogastropoda
- Order: Neogastropoda
- Superfamily: Conoidea
- Family: Conidae
- Genus: Profundiconus
- Species: P. cakobaui

Binomial name
- Profundiconus cakobaui (Moolenbeek, Röckel, & Bouchet, 2008)

Synonyms
- Conus cakobaui Moolenbeek, Röckel & Bouchet, 2008 (original combination)

= Profundiconus cakobaui =

Species of gastropod

Profundiconus cakobaui is a species of sea snail, a marine gastropod mollusk in the family Conidae, the cone snails and their allies.

Like all species within the genus Profundiconus, these cone snails are predatory and venomous. They are capable of stinging humans, therefore live ones should be handled carefully or not at all.

== Description ==
The size of the shell varies between 19 mm and 25 mm.

== Distribution ==
This species occurs in the Pacific Ocean off Fiji and Tonga.
