= Hunyadiscus andersoni =

Scientific classification
- Kingdom: Animalia
- Phylum: Mollusca
- Class: Gastropoda
- Order: Stylommatophora
- Family: Plectopylidae
- Genus: Hunyadiscus
- Species: H. andersoni

Binomial name
- Hunyadiscus andersoni (W. Blanford, 1869)

Synonyms
- Helix (Plectopylis) andersoni Blanford, 1869; Chersaecia andersoni (Blanford, 1869)

Species of gastropod

Hunyadiscus andersoni is a species of air-breathing land snail, a terrestrial pulmonate gastropod mollusc in the family Plectopylidae.

== Distribution ==
The distribution of Hunyadiscus andersoni includes Kachin State and Mandalay Region in Northern Myanmar and in Kakhyen Hills, Western Yunnan, China.

The type locality is "Bhamo in regno Avæ et Hoetone in Yunan".
