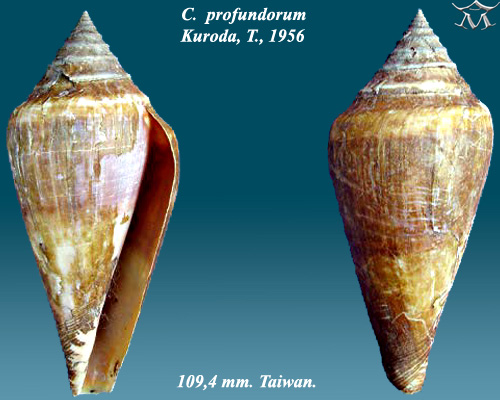
- Apertural and abapertural views of shell of Profundiconus profundorum (Kuroda, T., 1956)

Scientific classification
- Kingdom: Animalia
- Phylum: Mollusca
- Class: Gastropoda
- Subclass: Caenogastropoda
- Order: Neogastropoda
- Superfamily: Conoidea
- Family: Conidae
- Genus: Profundiconus
- Species: P. profundorum

Binomial name
- Profundiconus profundorum (Kuroda, 1956)

Synonyms
- Chelyconus profundorum Kuroda, 1956 (original combination); Conus profundorum (Kuroda, 1956); Profundiconus soyomaruae Okutani, 1964

= Profundiconus profundorum =

Species of gastropod

Profundiconus profundorum is a species of sea snail, a marine gastropod mollusk in the family Conidae, the cone snails and their allies.

Like all species within the genus Profundiconus, these cone snails are predatory and venomous. They are capable of stinging humans, therefore live ones should be handled carefully or not at all.

== Description ==
The size of the shell varies between 46 mm and 114 mm.

== Distribution ==
This marine species occurs off Japan, Taiwan and New Caledonia. Sometimes trawled by nets at 240-250 metres depth.
