= Profundiconus pacificus =

Scientific classification
- Kingdom: Animalia
- Phylum: Mollusca
- Class: Gastropoda
- Subclass: Caenogastropoda
- Order: Neogastropoda
- Superfamily: Conoidea
- Family: Conidae
- Genus: Profundiconus
- Species: P. pacificus

Binomial name
- Profundiconus pacificus (Moolenbeek & Röckel, 1996)

Synonyms
- Conus pacificus Moolenbeek & Röckel, 1996 (original combination); Cylinder pacificus (Moolenbeek & Röckel, 1996); Turriconus (Mitraconus) pacificus (Moolenbeek & Röckel, 1996)

Species of gastropod

Profundiconus pacificus is a species of sea snail, a marine gastropod mollusk in the family Conidae, the cone snails and their allies.

Like all species within the genus Profundiconus, these cone snails are predatory and venomous. They are capable of stinging humans, therefore live ones should be handled carefully or not at all.

== Description ==
The size of the shell attains 20 mm.

== Distribution ==
This marine species occurs off New Caledonia and Wallis & Futuna Islands
