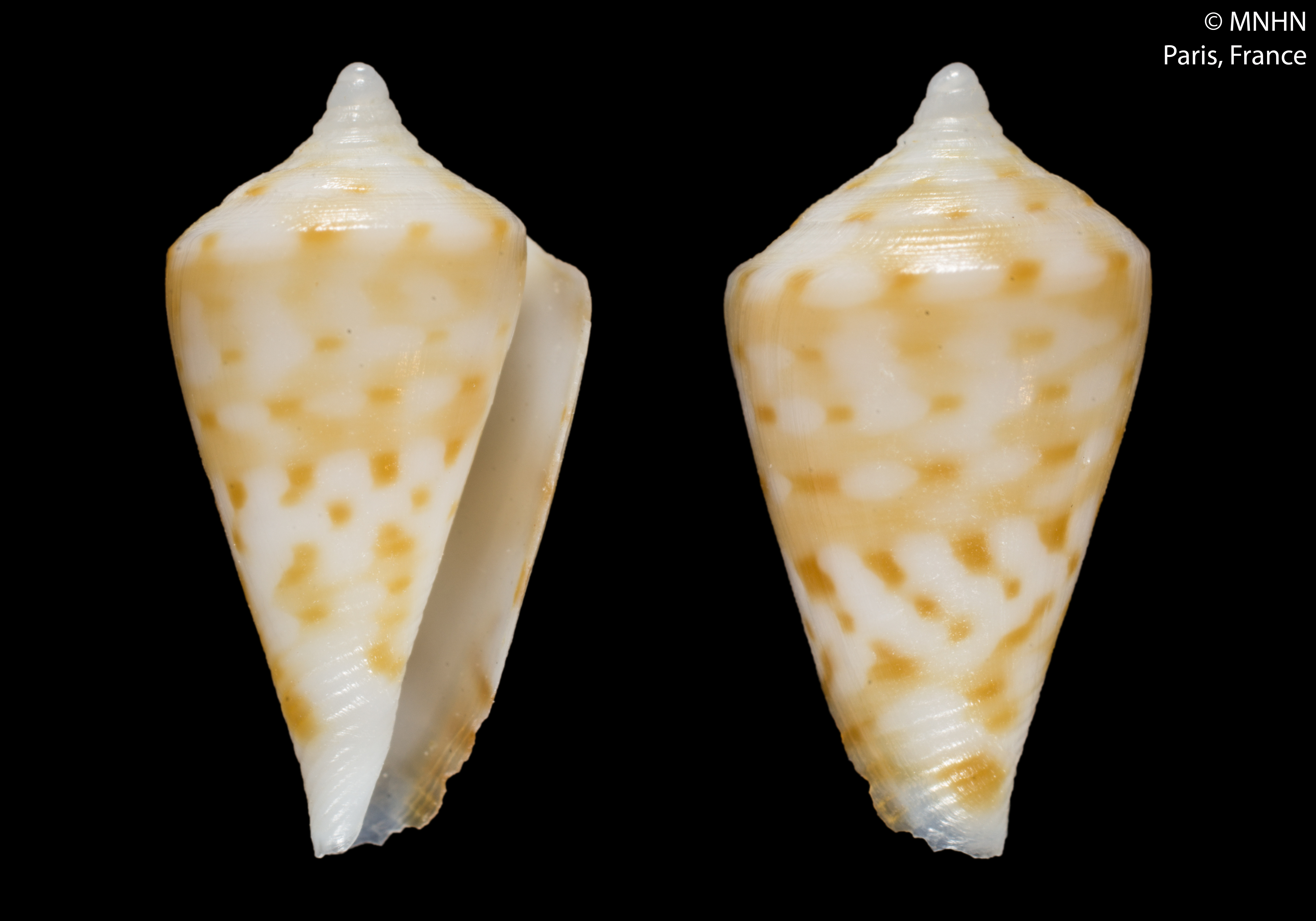
- Shell of Profundiconus zardoyai (holotype at MNHN, Paris)

Scientific classification
- Kingdom: Animalia
- Phylum: Mollusca
- Class: Gastropoda
- Subclass: Caenogastropoda
- Order: Neogastropoda
- Superfamily: Conoidea
- Family: Conidae
- Genus: Profundiconus
- Species: P. zardoyai

Binomial name
- Profundiconus zardoyai Tenorio 2015

= Profundiconus zardoyai =

Species of gastropod

Profundiconus zardoyai is a species of sea snail, a marine gastropod mollusc in the family Conidae, the cone snails and their allies.

Like all species within the genus Profundiconus, these cone snails are predatory and venomous. They are capable of stinging humans, therefore live ones should be handled carefully or not at all.

== Description ==
The size of the shell attains 10 mm.

== Distribution ==
This marine species occurs off New Caledonia.
