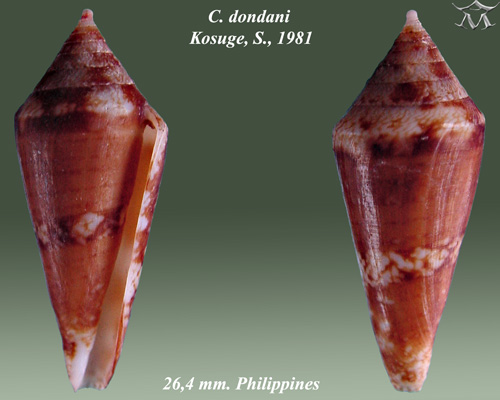
- Apertural and abapertural views of shell of Profundiconus dondani (Kosuge, S., 1981)

Conservation status
- Least Concern (IUCN 3.1)

Scientific classification
- Kingdom: Animalia
- Phylum: Mollusca
- Class: Gastropoda
- Subclass: Caenogastropoda
- Order: Neogastropoda
- Superfamily: Conoidea
- Family: Conidae
- Genus: Profundiconus
- Species: P. dondani

Binomial name
- Profundiconus dondani (Kosuge, 1981)

Synonyms
- Conus dondani Kosuge, 1981 (original combination); Cylinder dondani (Kosuge, 1981); Turriconus (Mitraconus) dondani (Kosuge, 1981)

= Profundiconus dondani =

Species of gastropod

Profundiconus dondani is a species of sea snail, a marine gastropod mollusk in the family Conidae, the cone snails and their allies.

Like all species within the genus Profundiconus, these cone snails are predatory and venomous. They are capable of stinging humans, therefore live ones should be handled carefully or not at all.

== Description ==
The size of the shell varies between 16 mm and 33 mm.

== Distribution ==
This marine species occurs off the Philippines.
