= Profundiconus jeanmartini =

Scientific classification
- Kingdom: Animalia
- Phylum: Mollusca
- Class: Gastropoda
- Subclass: Caenogastropoda
- Order: Neogastropoda
- Superfamily: Conoidea
- Family: Conidae
- Genus: Profundiconus
- Species: P. jeanmartini

Binomial name
- Profundiconus jeanmartini G. Raybaudi Massilia, 1992

Synonyms
- Conus jeanmartini (G. Raybaudi Massilia, 1992) (original combination)

Species of gastropod

Profundiconus jeanmartini is a species of sea snail, a marine gastropod mollusk in the family Conidae, the cone snails and their allies.

Like all species within the genus Profundiconus, these cone snails are predatory and venomous. They are capable of stinging humans, therefore live ones should be handled carefully or not at all.

== Description ==
The length of the shell varies between 25 mm and 67 mm.

== Distribution ==
This marine species occurs off Réunion and Sulawesi, Indonesia.
