= Profundiconus ikedai =

Scientific classification
- Kingdom: Animalia
- Phylum: Mollusca
- Class: Gastropoda
- Subclass: Caenogastropoda
- Order: Neogastropoda
- Superfamily: Conoidea
- Family: Conidae
- Genus: Profundiconus
- Species: P. ikedai

Binomial name
- Profundiconus ikedai (Ninomiya, 1987)

Synonyms
- Conus ikedai Ninomiya, 1987 (original combination)

Species of gastropod

Profundiconus ikedai is a species of sea snail, a marine gastropod mollusk in the family Conidae, the cone snails and their allies.

Like all species within the genus Profundiconus, these cone snails are predatory and venomous. They are capable of stinging humans, therefore live ones should be handled carefully or not at all.

== Description ==
The size of the shell varies between 25 mm and 50 mm.

== Distribution ==
This marine species occurs off Vietnam and in Sagami Bay, Japan.
