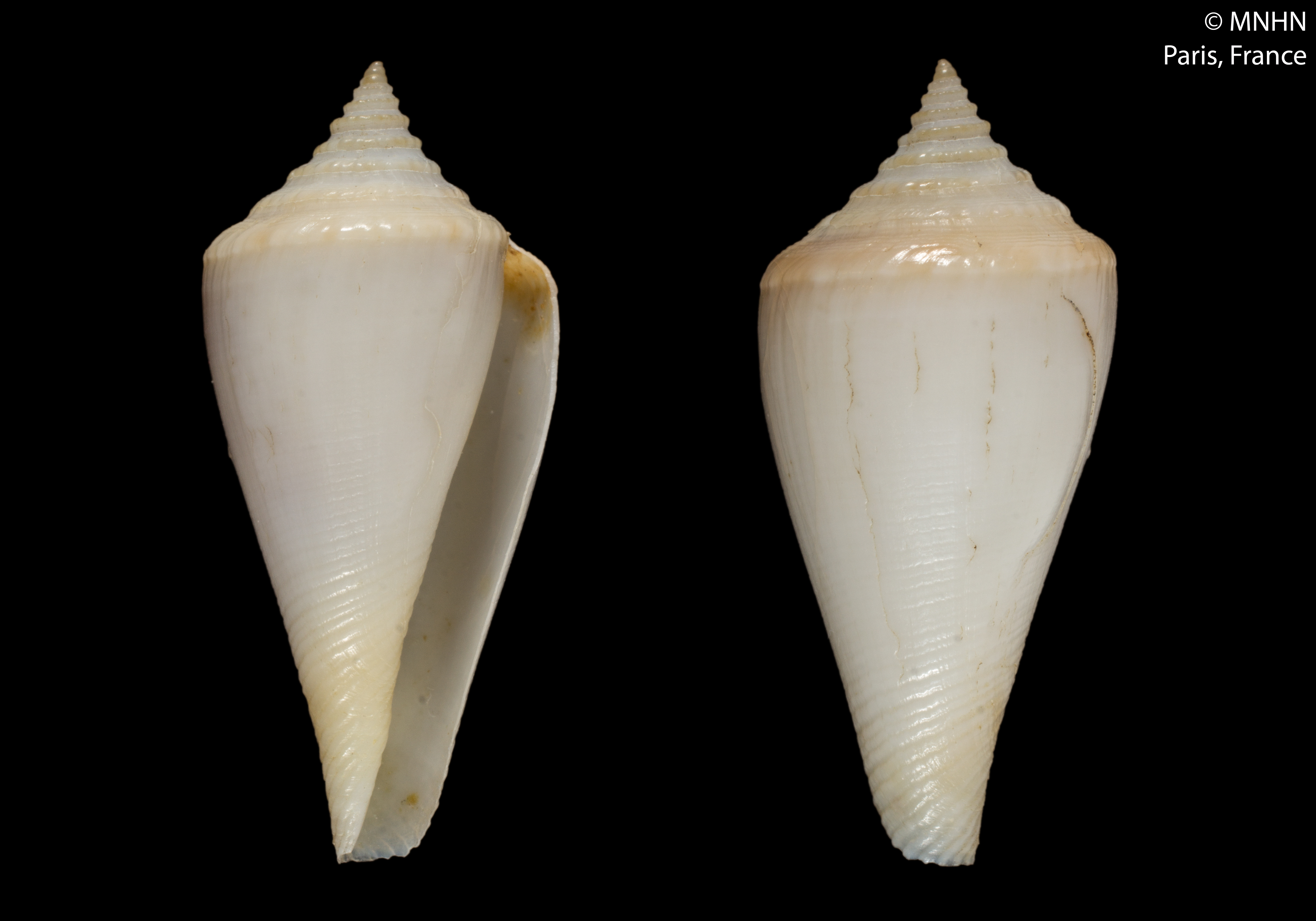
- Shell of Profundiconus frausseni (paratype at MNHN, Paris)

Conservation status
- Data Deficient (IUCN 3.1)

Scientific classification
- Kingdom: Animalia
- Phylum: Mollusca
- Class: Gastropoda
- Subclass: Caenogastropoda
- Order: Neogastropoda
- Superfamily: Conoidea
- Family: Conidae
- Genus: Profundiconus
- Species: P. frausseni

Binomial name
- Profundiconus frausseni (Tenorio & Poppe, 2004)

Synonyms
- Conus frausseni Tenorio & Poppe, 2004 (original combination)

= Profundiconus frausseni =

Species of gastropod

Profundiconus frausseni is a species of sea snail, a marine gastropod mollusk in the family Conidae, the cone snails and their allies.

Like all species within the genus Profundiconus, these cone snails are predatory and venomous. They are capable of stinging humans, therefore live ones should be handled carefully or not at all.

== Description ==
The size of the shell varies between 21.3 to 47 millimetres (0.84 to 1.85 in).

== Distribution ==
This marine species occurs off the coast of the Philippines.
