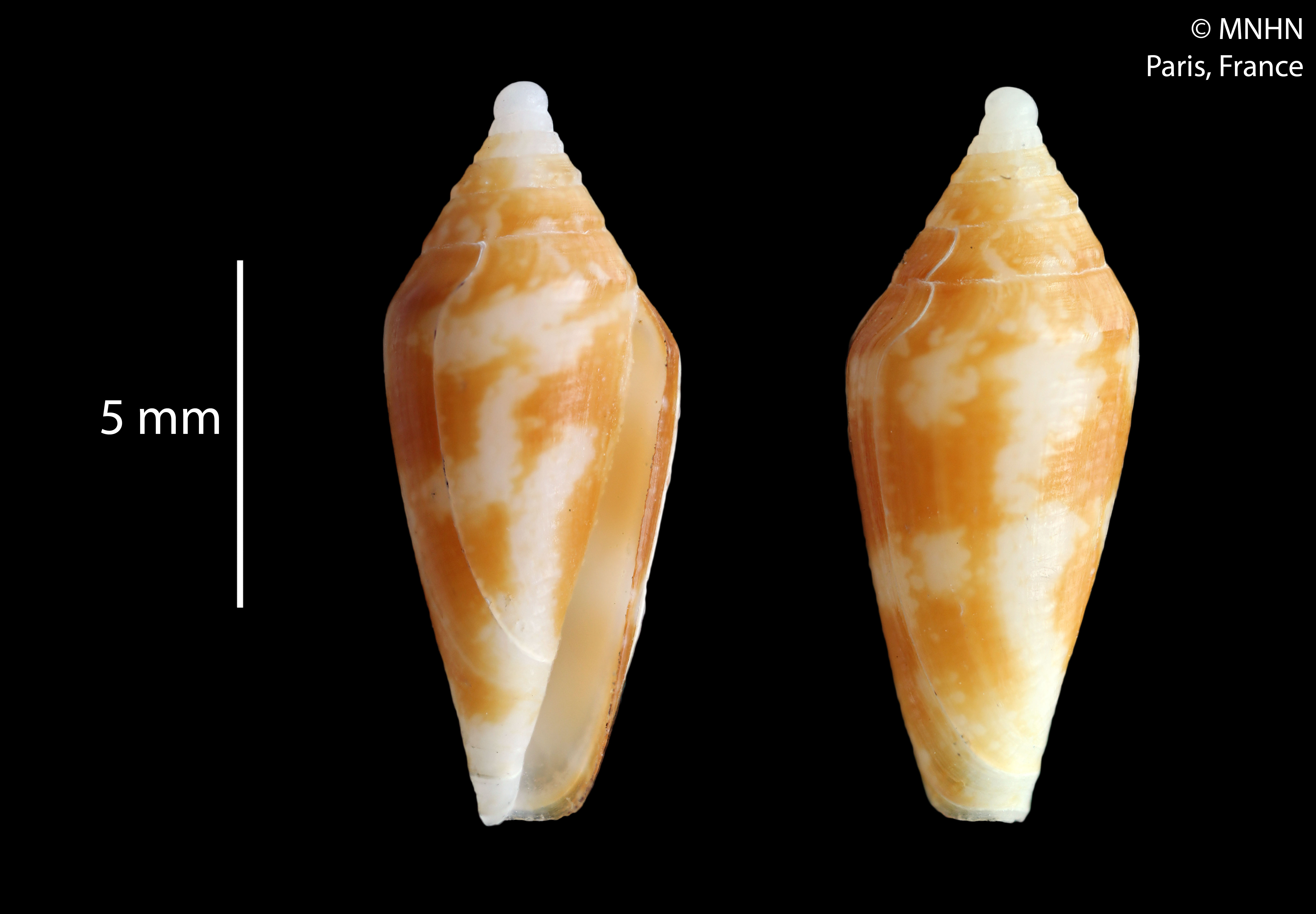
- Shell of Profundiconus stahlschmidti (paratype at MNHN, Paris)

Scientific classification
- Kingdom: Animalia
- Phylum: Mollusca
- Class: Gastropoda
- Subclass: Caenogastropoda
- Order: Neogastropoda
- Superfamily: Conoidea
- Family: Conidae
- Genus: Profundiconus
- Species: P. stahlschmidti

Binomial name
- Profundiconus stahlschmidti Tenorio & Tucker, 2014

Synonyms
- Turriconus (Mitraconus) stahlschmidti (Tenorio & J. K. Tucker, 2014)

= Profundiconus stahlschmidti =

Species of gastropod

Profundiconus stahlschmidti is a species of sea snail, a marine gastropod mollusc in the family Conidae, the cone snails and their allies.

Like all species within the genus Profundiconus, these cone snails are predatory and venomous. They are capable of stinging humans, therefore live ones should be handled carefully or not at all.

== Description ==
The size of the shell varies between 10 mm and 26 mm.

== Distribution ==
This marine species occurs off Togian Islands, Sulawesi, Indonesia.
