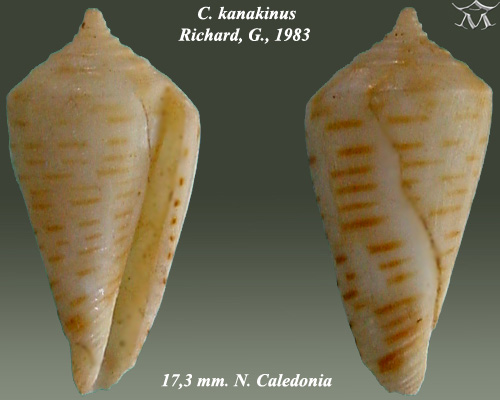
- Apertural and abapertural views of shell of Profundiconus kanakinus Richard, G., 1983
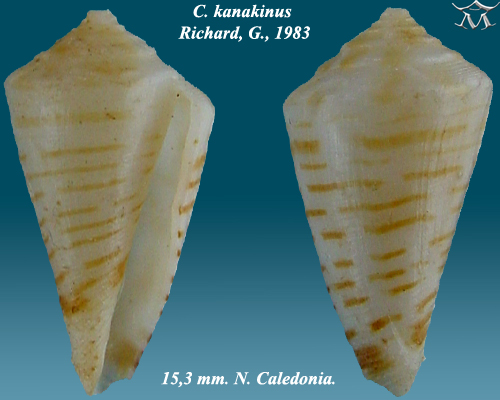

Scientific classification
- Kingdom: Animalia
- Phylum: Mollusca
- Class: Gastropoda
- Subclass: Caenogastropoda
- Order: Neogastropoda
- Superfamily: Conoidea
- Family: Conidae
- Genus: Profundiconus
- Species: P. kanakinus

Binomial name
- Profundiconus kanakinus (Richard, 1983)

Synonyms
- Conus kanakinus Richard, 1983 (original combination); Phasmoconus kanakinus (Richard, 1983)

= Profundiconus kanakinus =

Species of gastropod

Profundiconus kanakinus is a species of sea snail, a marine gastropod mollusk in the family Conidae, the cone snails and their allies.

Like all species within the genus Conus, these snails are predatory and venomous. They are capable of stinging humans, therefore live ones should be handled carefully or not at all.

== Description ==
The size of the shell varies between 11 mm and 21 mm.

== Distribution ==
This marine species occurs off New Caledonia.
