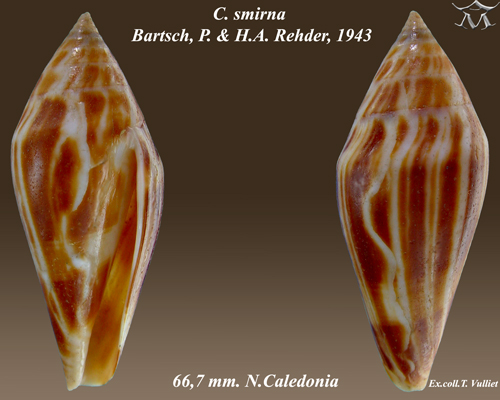
- Apertural and abapertural views of shell of Profundiconus smirna (Bartsch, P. & H.A. Rehder, 1943)

Scientific classification
- Kingdom: Animalia
- Phylum: Mollusca
- Class: Gastropoda
- Subclass: Caenogastropoda
- Order: Neogastropoda
- Superfamily: Conoidea
- Family: Conidae
- Genus: Profundiconus
- Species: P. smirna

Binomial name
- Profundiconus smirna (Bartsch & Rehder, 1943)

Synonyms
- Conus smirna Bartsch & Rehder, 1943 (original combination)

= Profundiconus smirna =

Species of gastropod

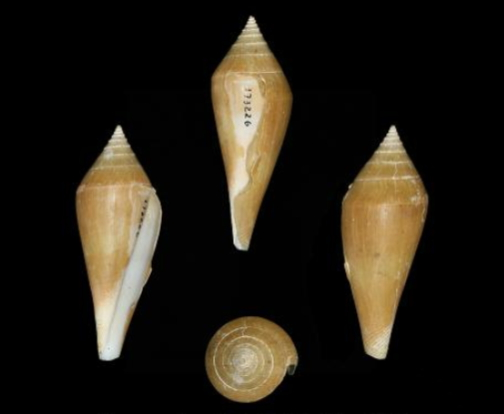
Profundiconus smirna, holotype at the Smithsonian Institution

Profundiconus smirna, common name the Smirna cone, is a species of sea snail, a marine gastropod mollusk in the family Conidae, the cone snails and their allies.

Like all species within the genus Profundiconus, these cone snails are predatory and venomous. They are capable of stinging humans, therefore live ones should be handled carefully or not at all.

== Description ==
The size of the shell varies between 39 mm and 98 mm.

== Distribution ==
This marine species occurs off Southern Japan; off Hawaii, Tonga, Fiji, and New Zealand.
