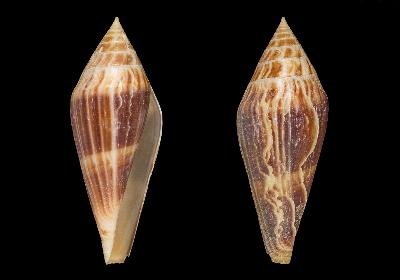
- Shell of Profundiconus smirnoides (holotype in MNHN, Paris)

Scientific classification
- Kingdom: Animalia
- Phylum: Mollusca
- Class: Gastropoda
- Subclass: Caenogastropoda
- Order: Neogastropoda
- Superfamily: Conoidea
- Family: Conidae
- Genus: Profundiconus
- Species: P. smirnoides

Binomial name
- Profundiconus smirnoides Tenorio 2015

= Profundiconus smirnoides =

Species of gastropod

Profundiconus smirnoides is a species of sea snails, a marine gastropod mollusc in the family Conidae, the cone snails and their allies.

Like all species within the genus Conus, these cone snails are predatory and venomous. They are capable of stinging humans, therefore live ones should be handled with caution or not at all.

== Description ==
The size of the shell varies between 11 mm and 21 mm. The shell is bright orange with streaks of white.

== Distribution ==
This marine species occurs at the Norfolk Ridge off New Caledonia.
