= Venustatrochus secundus =

Scientific classification
- Kingdom: Animalia
- Phylum: Mollusca
- Class: Gastropoda
- Subclass: Vetigastropoda
- Order: Trochida
- Family: Calliostomatidae
- Genus: Venustatrochus
- Species: V. secundus

Binomial name
- Venustatrochus secundus Powell, 1958

Species of gastropod

Venustatrochus secundus is a species of sea snail, a marine gastropod mollusk in the family Calliostomatidae, the top snails.
