= Profundiconus emersoni =

Scientific classification
- Kingdom: Animalia
- Phylum: Mollusca
- Class: Gastropoda
- Subclass: Caenogastropoda
- Order: Neogastropoda
- Superfamily: Conoidea
- Family: Conidae
- Genus: Profundiconus
- Species: P. emersoni

Binomial name
- Profundiconus emersoni (G. D. Hanna, 1963)

Synonyms
- Conus emersoni G. D. Hanna, 1963 (original combination)

Species of gastropod

Profundiconus emersoni is a species of sea snail, a marine gastropod mollusk in the family Conidae, the cone snails and their allies.

Like all species within the genus Profundiconus, these cone snails are predatory and venomous. They are capable of stinging humans, therefore live ones should be handled carefully or not at all.

== Description ==
The size of the shell attains 43 mm.

== Distribution ==
This marine species occurs off Baja California, Mexico, and off the Galapagos Islands.
