= Venustatrochus galateae =

Scientific classification
- Kingdom: Animalia
- Phylum: Mollusca
- Class: Gastropoda
- Subclass: Vetigastropoda
- Order: Trochida
- Superfamily: Trochoidea
- Family: Calliostomatidae
- Genus: Venustatrochus
- Species: V. galateae

Binomial name
- Venustatrochus galateae B. A. Marshall, 2016

Species of gastropod

Venustatrochus galateae is a species of sea snail, a marine gastropod mollusk, in the family Calliostomatidae within the superfamily Trochoidea, the top snails, turban snails and their allies.

== Distribution ==
This species occurs in New Zealand Exclusive Economic Zone.
