= Raphitoma maculosa =

Scientific classification
- Kingdom: Animalia
- Phylum: Mollusca
- Class: Gastropoda
- Subclass: Caenogastropoda
- Order: Neogastropoda
- Superfamily: Conoidea
- Family: Raphitomidae
- Genus: Raphitoma
- Species: R. maculosa

Binomial name
- Raphitoma maculosa Høisæter, 2016

Species of gastropod

Raphitoma maculosa is a species of sea snail, a marine gastropod mollusk in the family Raphitomidae.

This is a taxon inquirendum. It may be a divergent form of Raphitoma bicolor (Risso, 1826)

== Distribution ==
This marine species occurs off Norway.
