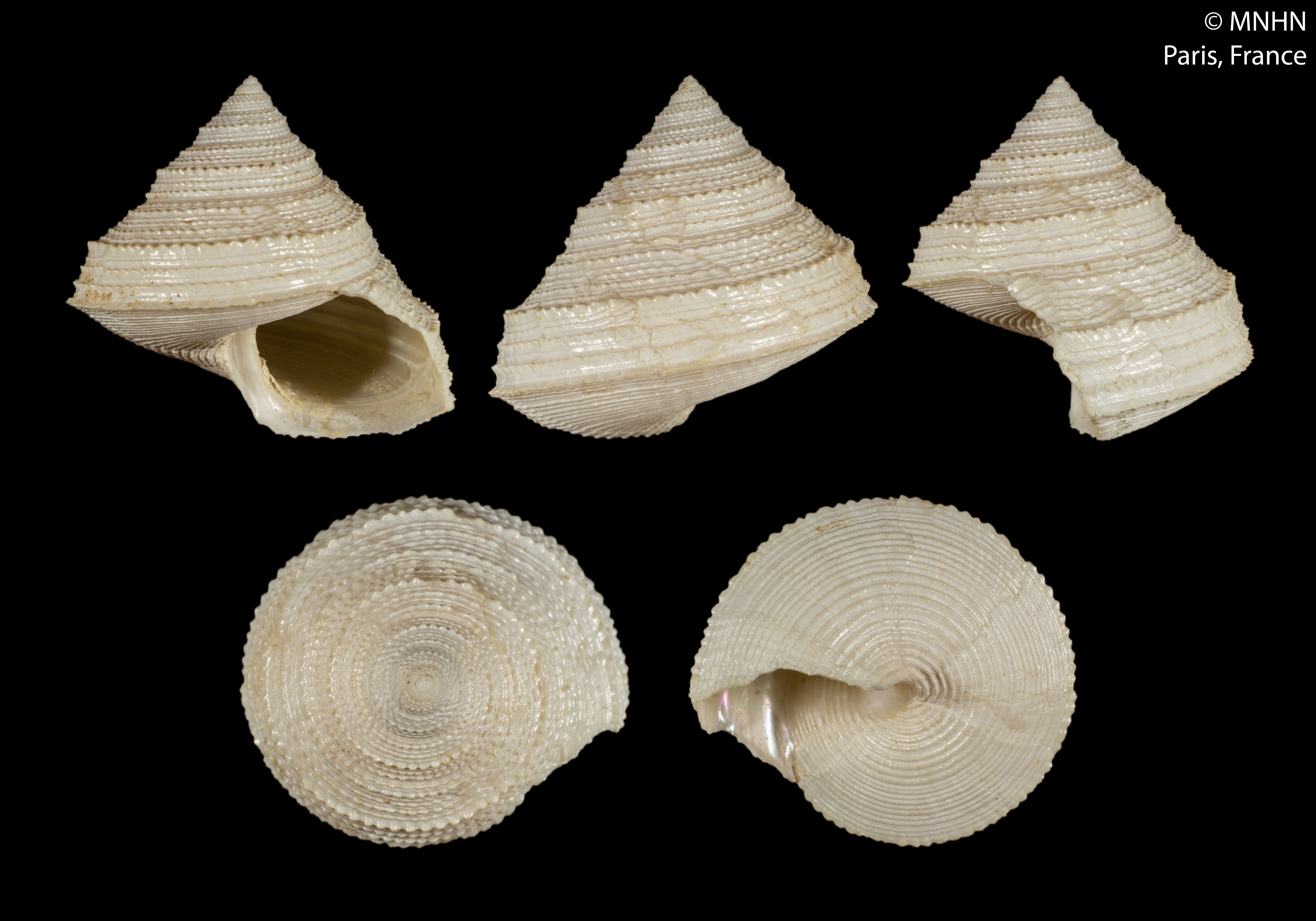
- Shell of Venustatrochus malaita

Scientific classification
- Kingdom: Animalia
- Phylum: Mollusca
- Class: Gastropoda
- Subclass: Vetigastropoda
- Order: Trochida
- Superfamily: Trochoidea
- Family: Calliostomatidae
- Genus: Venustatrochus; Powell, 1951

Type species
- Venustatrochus georgianus Powell, 1951

= Venustatrochus =

Genus of gastropods

Venustatrochus is a genus of sea snails, marine gastropod mollusks in the family Calliostomatidae.

== Species ==
Species within the genus Venustatrochus include:

- Venustatrochus atlantis B. A. Marshall, 2016
- Venustatrochus eclectus B. A. Marshall, 2016
- Venustatrochus galateae B. A. Marshall, 2016
- Venustatrochus georgianus A. W. B. Powell, 1951
- Venustatrochus malaita Vilvens, 2009
- Venustatrochus secundus Powell, 1958
- Venustatrochus youngi B. A. Marshall, 2016
