= Profundiconus vaubani =

Scientific classification
- Kingdom: Animalia
- Phylum: Mollusca
- Class: Gastropoda
- Subclass: Caenogastropoda
- Order: Neogastropoda
- Superfamily: Conoidea
- Family: Conidae
- Genus: Profundiconus
- Species: P. vaubani

Binomial name
- Profundiconus vaubani (Röckel, Richard & Moolenbeek, 1995)

Synonyms
- Conus vaubani Röckel & Moolenbeek, 1995 (original combination)

Species of gastropod

Profundiconus vaubani is a species of sea snail, a marine gastropod mollusk in the family Conidae, the cone snails and their allies.

Like all species within the genus Profundiconus, these cone snails are predatory and venomous. They are capable of stinging humans, therefore live ones should be handled carefully or not at all.

== Description ==
The size of the shell attains 25 mm.

== Distribution ==
The marine species can be found near New Caledonia.
