= Venustatrochus atlantis =

Scientific classification
- Kingdom: Animalia
- Phylum: Mollusca
- Class: Gastropoda
- Subclass: Vetigastropoda
- Order: Trochida
- Superfamily: Trochoidea
- Family: Calliostomatidae
- Genus: Venustatrochus
- Species: V. atlantis

Binomial name
- Venustatrochus atlantis (Clench & Aguayo, 1940)

Synonyms
- Calliostoma atlantis Clench & Aguayo, 1940

Species of gastropod

Venustatrochus atlantis is a species of sea snail, a marine gastropod mollusk, in the family Calliostomatidae within the superfamily Trochoidea, the top snails, turban snails and their allies.
