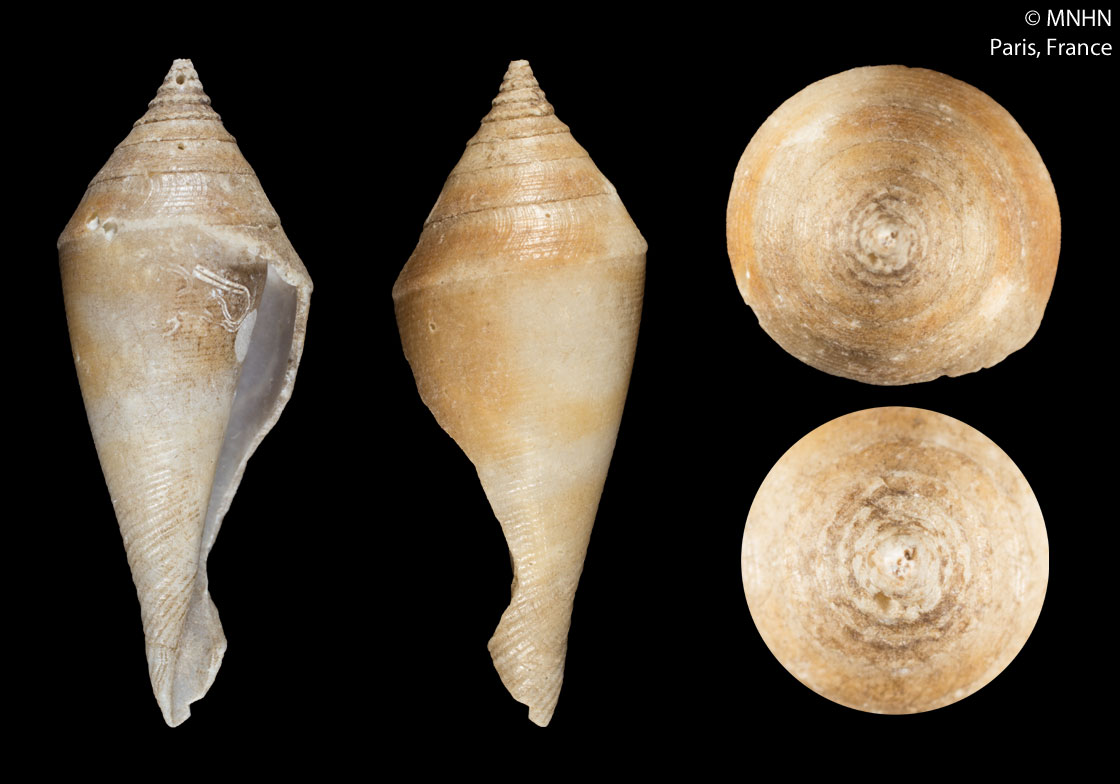
- Shell of Profundiconus tarava (paratype at MNHN, Paris)

Scientific classification
- Domain: Eukaryota
- Kingdom: Animalia
- Phylum: Mollusca
- Class: Gastropoda
- Subclass: Caenogastropoda
- Order: Neogastropoda
- Superfamily: Conoidea
- Family: Conidae
- Genus: Profundiconus
- Species: P. tarava

Binomial name
- Profundiconus tarava (Rabiller & Richard, 2014)

Synonyms
- Conus tarava Rabiller & Richard, 2014

= Profundiconus tarava =

Species of gastropod

Profundiconus tarava is a species of sea snail, a marine gastropod mollusk, in the family Conidae, the cone snails and their allies.

== Distribution ==
This marine species occurs off the Tarava Seamounts in the Southern Pacific Ocean.
