= Profundiconus loyaltiensis =

Scientific classification
- Kingdom: Animalia
- Phylum: Mollusca
- Class: Gastropoda
- Subclass: Caenogastropoda
- Order: Neogastropoda
- Superfamily: Conoidea
- Family: Conidae
- Genus: Profundiconus
- Species: P. loyaltiensis

Binomial name
- Profundiconus loyaltiensis (Röckel, Richard & Moolenbeek, 1995)

Synonyms
- Conus loyaltiensis Röckel & Moolenbeek, 1995 (original combination)

Species of gastropod

Profundiconus loyaltiensis is a species of sea snail, a marine gastropod mollusk in the family Conidae, the cone snails and their allies.

Like all species within the genus Profundiconus, these cone snails are predatory and venomous. They are capable of stinging humans, therefore live ones should be handled carefully or not at all.

== Description ==
The size of the shell varies between 19 mm and 22 mm.

== Distribution ==
This marine species occurs off New Caledonia.
