= Profundiconus scopulicola =

Conservation status
- Data Deficient (IUCN 3.1)

Scientific classification
- Kingdom: Animalia
- Phylum: Mollusca
- Class: Gastropoda
- Subclass: Caenogastropoda
- Order: Neogastropoda
- Superfamily: Conoidea
- Family: Conidae
- Genus: Profundiconus
- Species: P. scopulicola

Binomial name
- Profundiconus scopulicola Okutani, 1972

Synonyms
- Conus scopulicola (Okutani, 1972)

Species of gastropod

Profundiconus scopulicola is a species of sea snail, a marine gastropod mollusk in the family Conidae, the cone snails and their allies.

Like all species within the genus Profundiconus, these cone snails are predatory and venomous. They are capable of stinging humans, therefore live ones should be handled carefully or not at all.

== Description ==
The size of the shell varies between 15 mm and 22 mm. The last whorl is ventricosely conical. The shoulder rounded to be indistinct. The spire is high with the outline slightly sigmoid. The first postnuclear whorl is weakly tuberculate. While the telcoconch sutural ramps to be slightly convex with three increasing to five spiral grooves. The last whorl has fine closely spaced spiral ribs. The ground colour is cream. The last whorl has brown axial flames forming three variably continuous spiral bands below the shoulder and on both sides of centre. The larval shells have two whorls, with adjacent teleoconch sutural ramp being white, followed by brown radial streaks and blotches, covering nearly the entire ramp in late whorls. The aperture is also white.

== Distribution ==
This marine species occurs off southeast Honshu, Japan at depths of 200 meters.
