= Venustatrochus georgianus =

Scientific classification
- Kingdom: Animalia
- Phylum: Mollusca
- Class: Gastropoda
- Subclass: Vetigastropoda
- Order: Trochida
- Superfamily: Trochoidea
- Family: Calliostomatidae
- Genus: Venustatrochus
- Species: V. georgianus

Binomial name
- Venustatrochus georgianus A. W. B. Powell, 1951

Species of gastropod

Venustatrochus georgianus is a species of sea snail, a marine gastropod mollusk in the family Calliostomatidae.

== Description ==
The height of the shell attains 40 mm.

== Distribution ==
This marine species occurs off the South Georgia Islands at depths between 108 m and 144 m.
