= Profundiconus neotorquatus =

Scientific classification
- Kingdom: Animalia
- Phylum: Mollusca
- Class: Gastropoda
- Subclass: Caenogastropoda
- Order: Neogastropoda
- Superfamily: Conoidea
- Family: Conidae
- Genus: Profundiconus
- Species: P. neotorquatus

Binomial name
- Profundiconus neotorquatus (da Motta, 1985)

Synonyms
- Conus neotorquatus da Motta, 1985 (original combination); Conus torquatus Martens, 1901 (invalid: junior secondary homonym of Cucullus torquatus Röding, 1798; Conus neotorquatus is a replacement name)

Species of gastropod

Profundiconus neotorquatus is a species of sea snail, a marine gastropod mollusk in the family Conidae, the cone snails and their allies.

Like all species within the genus Profundiconus, these cone snails are predatory and venomous. They are capable of stinging humans, therefore live ones should be handled carefully or not at all.

== Description ==
The length of the shell varies between 50 mm and 111 mm.

== Distribution ==
This marine species occurs in the Indian Ocean off Madagascar and Somalia.
