= Profundiconus tuberculosus =

Scientific classification
- Kingdom: Animalia
- Phylum: Mollusca
- Class: Gastropoda
- Subclass: Caenogastropoda
- Order: Neogastropoda
- Superfamily: Conoidea
- Family: Conidae
- Genus: Profundiconus
- Species: P. tuberculosus

Binomial name
- Profundiconus tuberculosus (Tomlin, 1937)

Synonyms
- Conus tuberculosus Tomlin, 1937 (original combination)

Species of gastropod

Profundiconus tuberculosus is a species of sea snail, a marine gastropod mollusk in the family Conidae, the cone snails and their allies.

Profundiconus tuberculosus was believed to be extinct, and thus it is often represented with a dagger "†" as a fossil species. Mike Filmer (2011) notes in Nomenclature and Taxonomy in Living Conidae that living specimens have been found, citing Toki, 1937.

Like all species within the genus Profundiconus, these cone snails are predatory and venomous. They are capable of stinging humans, therefore live ones should be handled carefully or not at all.

== Description ==
The size of the shell varies between 14 mm and 30 mm.

== Distribution ==
This marine species occurs in Sagami Bay, Japan and in the China Sea; in the Pacific Ocean off the Tarava Seamounts, off Tahiti.
