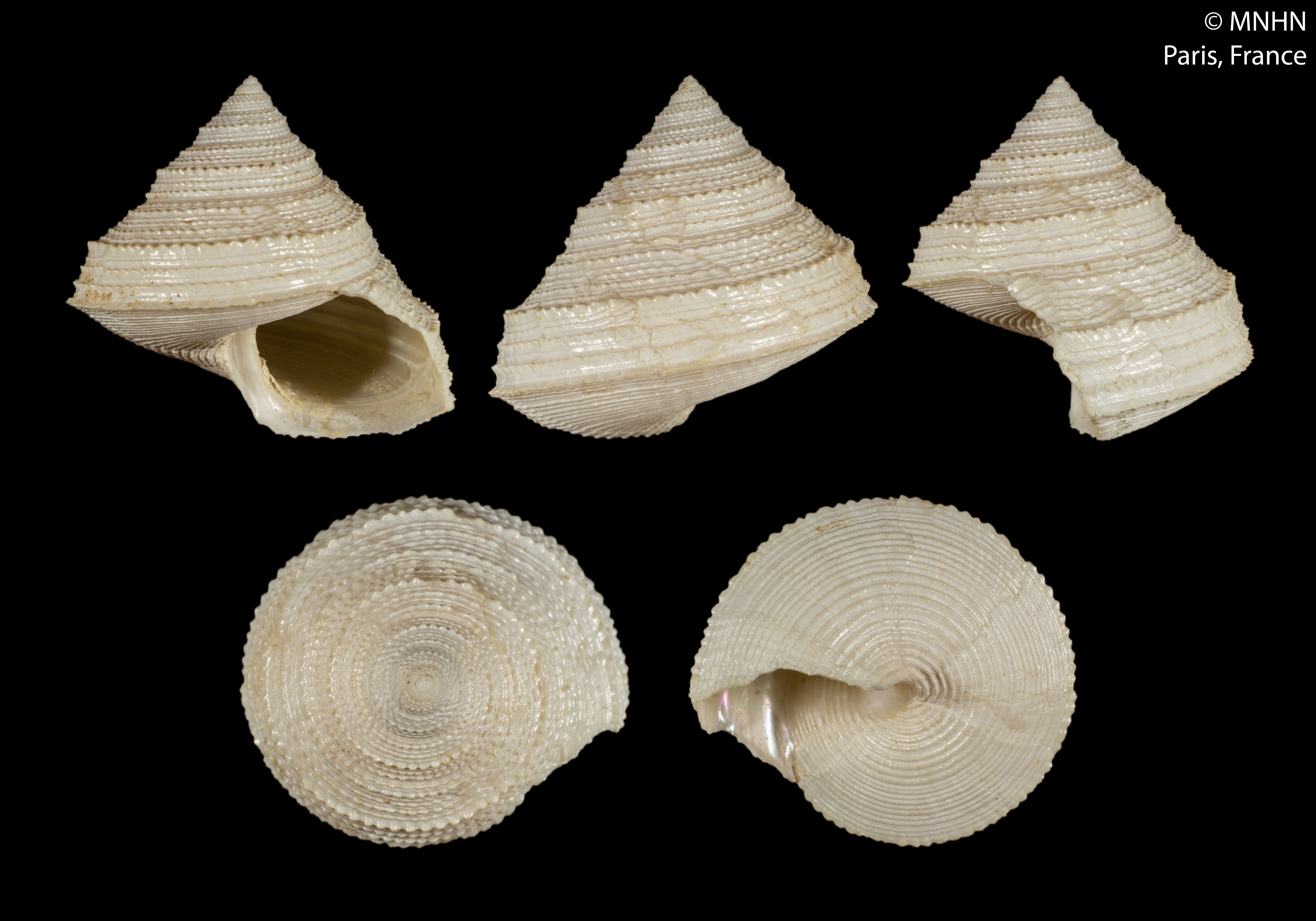
- Samples of Venustatrochus malaita (holotype at MNHN, Paris)

Scientific classification
- Kingdom: Animalia
- Phylum: Mollusca
- Class: Gastropoda
- Subclass: Vetigastropoda
- Order: Trochida
- Superfamily: Trochoidea
- Family: Calliostomatidae
- Genus: Venustatrochus
- Species: V. malaita

Binomial name
- Venustatrochus malaita (Vilvens, 2009)

Synonyms
- Benthastelena malaita C. Vilvens, 2009; Calliostoma malaita Vilvens, 2009

= Venustatrochus malaita =

Species of gastropod

Venustatrochus malaita is a species of sea snail, a marine gastropod mollusk, in the family Calliostomatidae within the superfamily Trochoidea, the top snails, turban snails and their allies.

== Distribution ==
This marine species occurs off the Solomon Islands.
