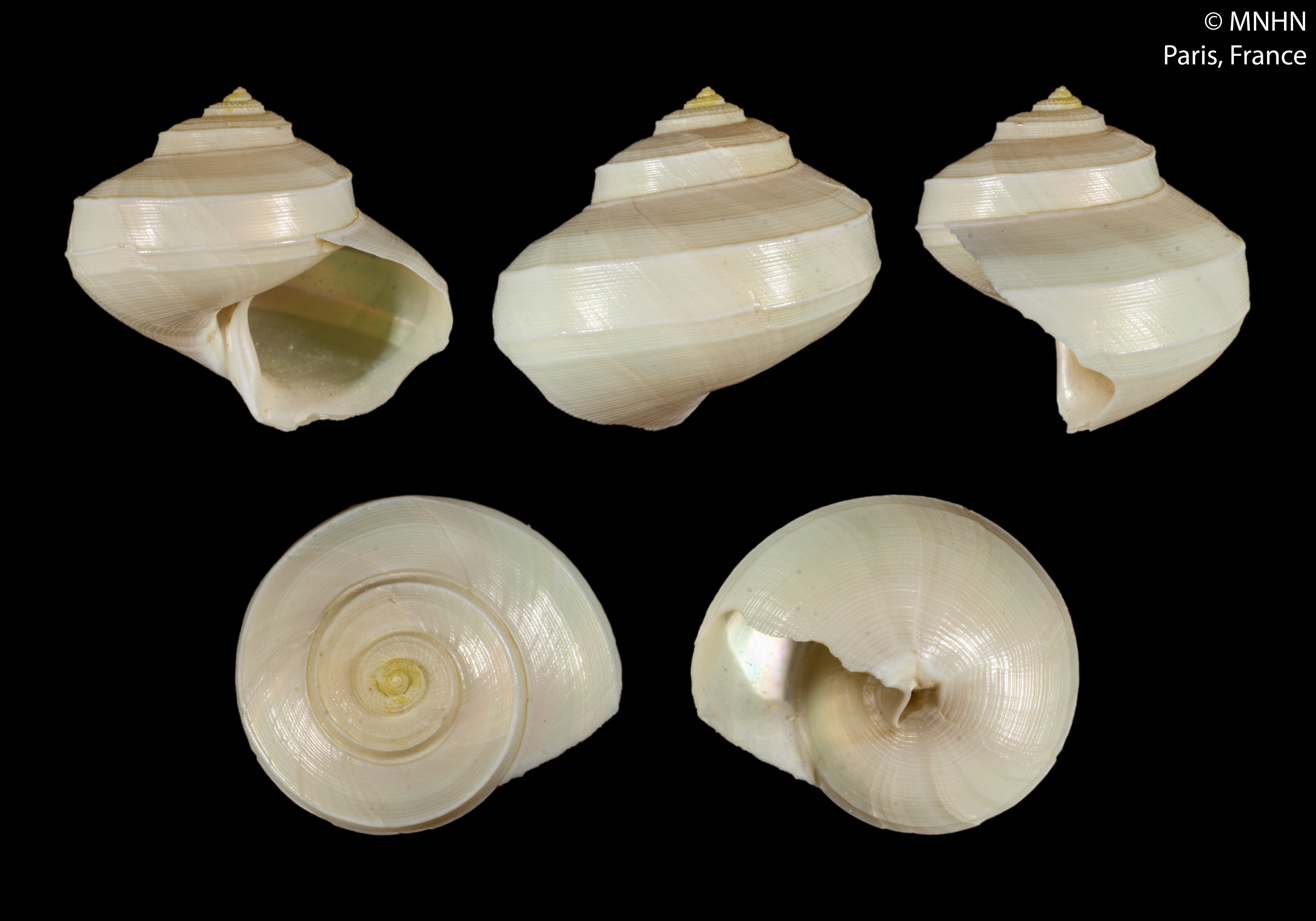
- Shell of Phenacomargarites williamsae (holotype at MNHN, Paris)

Scientific classification
- Kingdom: Animalia
- Phylum: Mollusca
- Class: Gastropoda
- Subclass: Vetigastropoda
- Order: Trochida
- Superfamily: Trochoidea
- Family: Calliostomatidae
- Genus: Phenacomargarites
- Species: P. williamsae

Binomial name
- Phenacomargarites williamsae B. A. Marshall, 2016

= Phenacomargarites williamsae =

Species of gastropod

Phenacomargarites williamsae is a species of sea snail, a marine gastropod mollusk, in the family Calliostomatidae within the superfamily Trochoidea, the top snails, turban snails and their allies.

== Description ==
The shell has a turbinate shape, and attains a length of 22.1 mm. The shell has a silver/yellow color, with the aperture protruding in an arch shape.

== Distribution ==
This marine species occurs off the Solomon Islands.
