= Amphidromus stevenliei =

Scientific classification
- Kingdom: Animalia
- Phylum: Mollusca
- Class: Gastropoda
- Order: Stylommatophora
- Family: Camaenidae
- Genus: Amphidromus
- Species: A. stevenliei

Binomial name
- Amphidromus stevenliei J. Parsons, 2016

Synonyms
- Amphidromus (Syndromus) stevenliei J. Parsons, 2016 alternative representation

Species of snail in the family Camaenidae

Amphidromus stevenliei is a species of medium-sized air-breathing tree snail, an arboreal gastropod mollusk in the family Camaenidae.

The holotype of the shell is in the Natural History Museum, London.

== Distribution ==
The type locality of this species is Kalimantan, Indonesia.
