= Conus guanahacabibensis =

Scientific classification
- Kingdom: Animalia
- Phylum: Mollusca
- Class: Gastropoda
- Subclass: Caenogastropoda
- Order: Neogastropoda
- Superfamily: Conoidea
- Family: Conidae
- Genus: Conus
- Species: C. guanahacabibensis

Binomial name
- Conus guanahacabibensis Espinosa & Ortea, 2016

Species of sea snail

Conus guanahacabibensis is a species of sea snail, a marine gastropod mollusc in the family Conidae, the cone snails, cone shells or cones.

This snail is predatory and venomous and is capable of stinging humans.

== Distribution ==
This marine species of cone snail occurs off Cuba.
