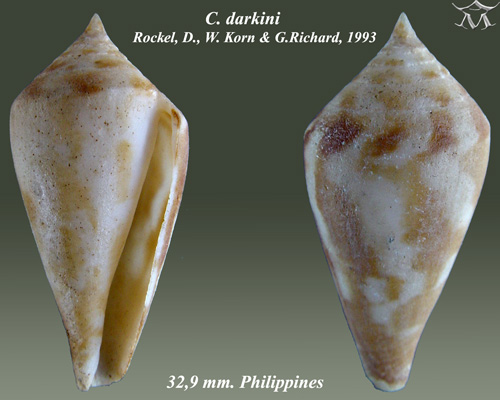
- Two views of a shell of Conus darkini

Conservation status
- Least Concern (IUCN 3.1)

Scientific classification
- Kingdom: Animalia
- Phylum: Mollusca
- Class: Gastropoda
- Subclass: Caenogastropoda
- Order: Neogastropoda
- Superfamily: Conoidea
- Family: Conidae
- Genus: Conus
- Species: C. darkini

Binomial name
- Conus darkini Petuch, 1987

Synonyms
- Conus (Embrikena) darkini Röckel, Korn & Richard, 1993 · accepted, alternate representation; Embrikena darkini (Röckel, Korn & Richard, 1993); Profundiconus darkini (Röckel, Korn & Richard, 1993); Turriconus (Kurodaconus) darkini (Röckel, Korn & Richard, 1993)

= Conus darkini =

Species of sea snail

Conus darkini is a species of sea snail, a marine gastropod mollusk in the family Conidae, the cone snails and their allies.

Like all species within the genus Conus, these snails are predatory and venomous. They are capable of stinging humans, therefore live ones should be handled carefully or not at all.

== Description ==
The size of the shell varies between 34 mm and 87 mm.

== Distribution ==
This marine species occurs off the Philippines, New Caledonia and the Loyalty Islands.
