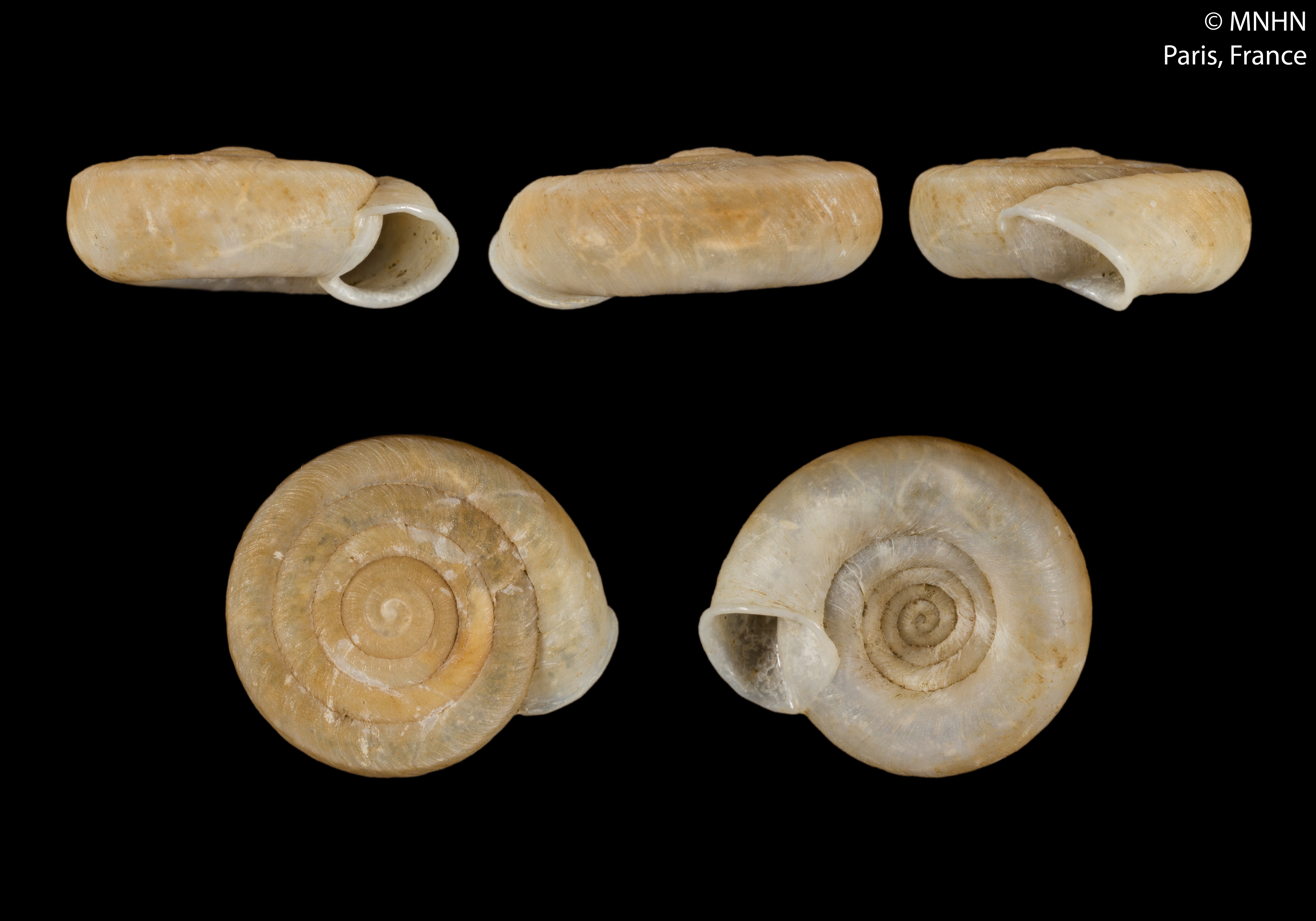
- Shell of Hunyadiscus saurini

Scientific classification
- Kingdom: Animalia
- Phylum: Mollusca
- Class: Gastropoda
- Order: Stylommatophora
- Infraorder: incertae sedis
- Superfamily: Plectopyloidea
- Family: Plectopylidae
- Genus: Hunyadiscus; Páll-Gergely, 2016

= Hunyadiscus =

Genus of gastropods

Hunyadiscus is a genus of air-breathing land snails, terrestrial pulmonate gastropod mollusks in the family Plectopylidae.

== Species ==
Species in the genus Hunyadiscus include:

- Hunyadiscus andersoni (W. T. Blanford, 1869)
- Hunyadiscus saurini Páll-Gergely, 2016
- Hunyadiscus tigrina Páll-Gergely, 2018
