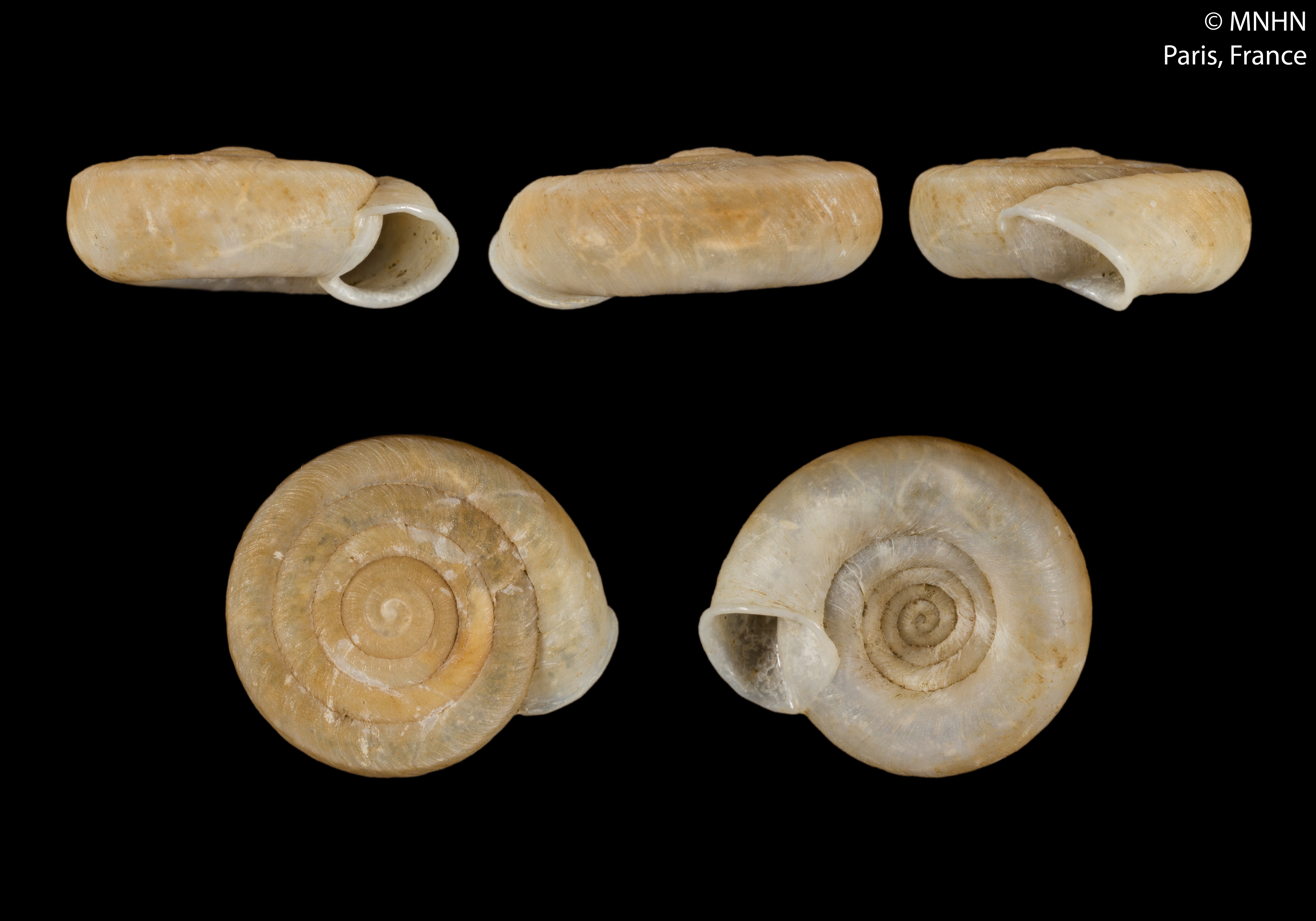
- Shell of Hunyadiscus saurini (holotype at MNHN, Paris)

Scientific classification
- Kingdom: Animalia
- Phylum: Mollusca
- Class: Gastropoda
- Order: Stylommatophora
- Family: Plectopylidae
- Genus: Hunyadiscus
- Species: H. saurini

Binomial name
- Hunyadiscus saurini Páll-Gergely, 2016

= Hunyadiscus saurini =

Species of gastropod

Hunyadiscus saurini is a species of air-breathing land snails, a terrestrial pulmonate gastropod mollusc in the family Plectopylidae.

The specific name saurini is in honour of French geologist and malacologist Edmond Saurin (1904–1977), who collected type material. Saurin's type material is as of 2016 the only known material of this species.

== Distribution ==
The distribution of Hunyadiscus saurini includes Laos.

The type locality is "Laos, Pa Hia (Ancienne province Tran Ninh)".
