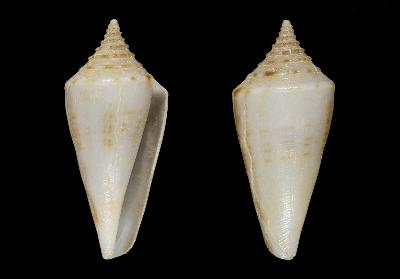
- Shell of Profundiconus robmoolenbeeki (holotype in MNHN, Paris)

Scientific classification
- Kingdom: Animalia
- Phylum: Mollusca
- Class: Gastropoda
- Subclass: Caenogastropoda
- Order: Neogastropoda
- Superfamily: Conoidea
- Family: Conidae
- Genus: Profundiconus
- Species: P. robmoolenbeeki

Binomial name
- Profundiconus robmoolenbeeki Tenorio, 2016

= Profundiconus robmoolenbeeki =

Species of gastropod

Profundiconus robmoolenbeeki is a species of sea snail, a marine gastropod mollusk in the family Conidae, the cone snails and their allies.

Like all species within the genus Profundiconus, these cone snails are predatory and venomous. They are capable of stinging humans, therefore live ones should be handled carefully or not at all.

== Description ==
The length of the shell attains 23.7 mm.

== Distribution ==
This marine species occurs in the Pacific Ocean off the Solomon Islands.
