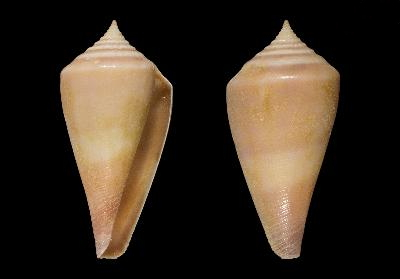
- Shell of Profundiconus neocaledonicus (holotype in MNHN, Paris)

Scientific classification
- Kingdom: Animalia
- Phylum: Mollusca
- Class: Gastropoda
- Subclass: Caenogastropoda
- Order: Neogastropoda
- Superfamily: Conoidea
- Family: Conidae
- Genus: Profundiconus
- Species: P. neocaledonicus

Binomial name
- Profundiconus neocaledonicus Tenorio & Castelin, 2016

= Profundiconus neocaledonicus =

Species of gastropod

Profundiconus neocaledonicus is a species of sea snail, a marine gastropod mollusk in the family Conidae, the cone snails and their allies.

Like all species within the genus Profundiconus, these cone snails are predatory and venomous. A total of 82 venom components were identified from Profundiconus neocaledonicus. Their venom is distinct from other cone snails so they must be handled with caution.

== Description ==
The length of the shell attains 70 mm.

== Distribution ==
This marine species occurs in the Pacific Ocean off the Norfolk Ridge (off New Caledonia).
