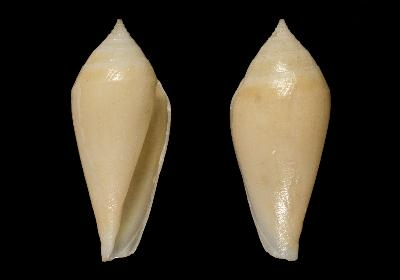
- Shell of Profundiconus puillandrei (holotype in MNHN, Paris)

Scientific classification
- Kingdom: Animalia
- Phylum: Mollusca
- Class: Gastropoda
- Subclass: Caenogastropoda
- Order: Neogastropoda
- Superfamily: Conoidea
- Family: Conidae
- Genus: Profundiconus
- Species: P. puillandrei

Binomial name
- Profundiconus puillandrei Tenorio & Castelin, 2016

= Profundiconus puillandrei =

Species of gastropod

Profundiconus puillandrei is a species of sea snail, a marine gastropod mollusk in the family Conidae, the cone snails and their allies.

Like all species within the genus Profundiconus, these cone snails are predatory and venomous. They are capable of stinging humans, therefore live ones should be handled carefully or not at all.

== Description ==
The length of the shell attains 43.2 mm.

== Distribution ==
This marine species occurs in the Pacific Ocean off the Norfolk Ridge (off New Caledonia).
