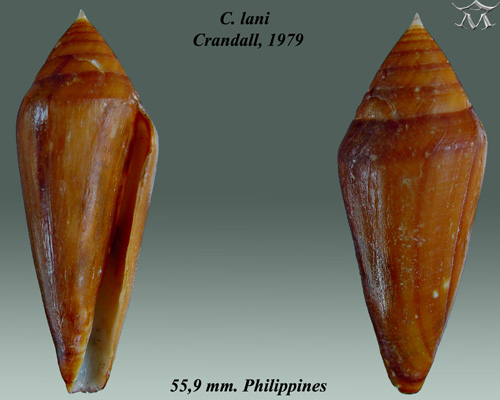
- Apertural and abapertural views of shell of 'Profundiconus lani (Crandall, 1979)

Conservation status
- Least Concern (IUCN 3.1)

Scientific classification
- Kingdom: Animalia
- Phylum: Mollusca
- Class: Gastropoda
- Subclass: Caenogastropoda
- Order: Neogastropoda
- Superfamily: Conoidea
- Family: Conidae
- Genus: Profundiconus
- Species: P. lani

Binomial name
- Profundiconus lani (Crandall, 1979)

Synonyms
- Conus (Profundiconus) nigrostriatus Kosuge, 1979 · accepted, alternate representation; Conus lani Crandall, 1979 (original combination); Conus nigrostriatus Kosuge, 1979

= Profundiconus lani =

Species of gastropod

Profundiconus lani is a species of sea snail, a marine gastropod mollusk in the family Conidae, the cone snails and their allies.

Like all species within the genus Profundiconus, these cone snails are predatory and venomous. They are capable of stinging humans, therefore live ones should be handled carefully or not at all.

== Description ==
The size of the shell varies between 41 mm and 54 mm.

== Distribution ==
This marine species occurs off Taiwan, the Philippines, the Solomon Islands, the Loyalty Islands and New Caledonia; in the South China Sea.
