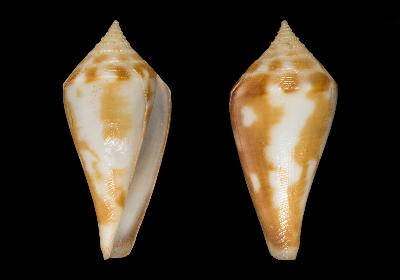
- Shell of Profundiconus limpalaeri (holotype in MNHN, Paris)

Scientific classification
- Kingdom: Animalia
- Phylum: Mollusca
- Class: Gastropoda
- Subclass: Caenogastropoda
- Order: Neogastropoda
- Superfamily: Conoidea
- Family: Conidae
- Genus: Profundiconus
- Species: P. limpalaeri

Binomial name
- Profundiconus limpalaeri Tenorio & Monnier, 2016

= Profundiconus limpalaeri =

Species of gastropod

Profundiconus limpalaeri is a species of sea snail, a marine gastropod mollusk in the family Conidae, the cone snails and their allies.

Like all species within the genus Profundiconus, these cone snails are predatory and venomous. They are capable of stinging humans, therefore live ones should be handled carefully or not at all.

== Description ==
The length of the shell attains 35 mm, making it a moderately sized gastropod. The shape of the shell is ventricosly conical while the spire is moderate to high, concave and slightly sigmoid in profile. The paucispiral protoconch is white to creamy-yellow, translucent and porcellaneous with a diameter of 0.98 millimeter. The early teleoconch whorls have three to four cords. The shoulder is angulated with a weak ridge. The sides of the shell is slightly convex below the shoulder and then becomes straight before becoming Slightly concave in the anterior. The last whorl is smooth except for the 8-9 grooves at the basal quarter. The posterior notch is shallow and C-shaped while there is no anterior notch present.

== Distribution ==
This species occurs off Balut Island, South Mindanao, and the neighbouring Sarangani island the Philippines at depths of 100 to 450 meters.
