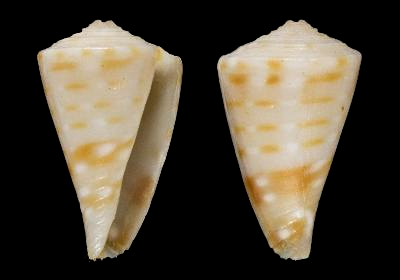
- Shell of Profundiconus barazeri (holotype in MNHN, Paris)

Scientific classification
- Kingdom: Animalia
- Phylum: Mollusca
- Class: Gastropoda
- Subclass: Caenogastropoda
- Order: Neogastropoda
- Superfamily: Conoidea
- Family: Conidae
- Genus: Profundiconus
- Species: P. barazeri

Binomial name
- Profundiconus barazeri Tenorio & Castelin, 2016

= Profundiconus barazeri =

Species of gastropod

Profundiconus barazeri is a species of sea snail, a marine gastropod mollusk in the family Conidae, the cone snails and their allies.

Like all species within the genus Profundiconus, these cone snails are predatory and venomous. They are capable of stinging humans, therefore live ones should be handled carefully or not at all.

== Description ==
The length of the shell attains 11.6 mm.

== Distribution ==
This species occurs in the Pacific Ocean off the Chesterfield Archipelago (off New Caledonia).
