= Cuthona luciae =

Scientific classification
- Kingdom: Animalia
- Phylum: Mollusca
- Class: Gastropoda
- Order: Nudibranchia
- Suborder: Aeolidacea
- Family: Cuthonidae
- Genus: Cuthona
- Species: C. luciae

Binomial name
- Cuthona luciae Valdés, Medrano & Bhave, 2016

Species of gastropod

This taxon is inactive. Cuthona luciae has been found to be a synonym of Cuthona herrerai.

Cuthona luciae is a species of sea slugs, an aeolid nudibranch, a marine gastropod mollusc in the family Fionidae.

== Etymology ==
The specific name luciae is in honour of Lucı́a Valdés, the daughter of malacologist Ángel Valdés. The type specimens are stored in the Museo de Malacologı́a, University of Panama and the Natural History Museum of Los Angeles County.

== Distribution ==
The type locality of this species is Crawl Cay, Bocas del Toro Archipelago, Panama. The distribution includes the area from Florida to Panama. It may possibly also live in Brazil.

== Description ==
The body length is up to 12 mm. It has yellow cerata. Each ceras has one blue band. The oral tentacles are orange and there is a blue band on the head. The reproductive system contains a penial stylet.

Tenellia caerulea is a similar species. They differ in the radula, jaw and reproductive system. Tenellia herrerai is another similar species. It differs in the radula and in coloration. Tenellia herrerai has no orange oral tentacles and it has no blue band on the head. Tenellia iris is also similar to Tenellia luciae.

== Ecology ==
Cuthona luciae was found on unidentified hydroids. These may be its prey, because hydroids are also the prey of other Cuthona species. It was recorded from a depth of 1 m.
