= Tarava Seamounts =

Seamount chain in South Pacific ocean

- Tarava Seamounts

Location
- Location: South Pacific Ocean
- Coordinates: 18°18′S 153°00′W

Geology
- Type: Seamount chain
- Age of rock: 43.5–36.1 Ma

The Tarava Seamounts are a group of seamounts in the southern Pacific Ocean, southwest of the Society Islands. They are formed by five guyots and a number of cone-shaped seamounts. Of Eocene-Oligocene age, they may have formed under the influence of a hotspot.

== Geography and geology ==
The Tarava Seamounts are also known as the Savannah Seamounts and were discovered during the 1996 ZEPOLYF1 oceanographic cruise. East of the Tarava Seamounts lie the Va'a Tau Piti seamounts, which were sometimes considered part of the Tarava Seamounts but are considered geologically separate owing to their different configuration (east-west rather than northwest-southeast), which may reflect an origin close to the East Pacific Rise.

=== Regional ===
Linear chains of volcanoes in the Pacific have been attributed to deep mantle plumes, but a number of such chains appear to correspond to short lasting volcanism, such as processes triggered by tension in the Pacific Plate.

The South Pacific superswell is an area of large area of anomalously high topography in the southern Pacific Ocean, where there are many volcanoes and the seafloor is unusually shallow. Asthenospheric processes may be responsible for its existence.

=== Local ===
The Tarava Seamounts consist of eighteen separate edifices which extend across six longitudes and four latitudes over a length of 700 kilometres (430 mi), 200 kilometres (120 mi) away from the Society Islands. Aside from five large guyots which reach depths of 580 metres (1,900 ft) below sea level, the Tarava Seamounts consist of 4,000–4,500 metres (13,100–14,800 ft) high cones. Among the named edifices are Arere (‘Arere, 16.808333°S 155.193333°W), Fafa Piti (18.961667°S 154.096667°W), Honu (18.376667°S 154.09°W), Orio'Mata (‘Ori‘o Mata Seamount 17.813333°S 154.075°W), Otaha ( ‘Otaha Seamount 18.758333°S 152.24°W), Otu'eroa (‘Otu‘eroa Seamount 18.22°S 152.748333°W), Punu Taipu Guyot (19.275°S 150.98°W) and Ua'ao.(18.916667°S 151.838333°W)

The seamounts are considered to be of Eocene-Oligocene age. Only two seamounts have been dated, both by potassium-argon dating: Fafa Piti has yielded ages of 43.5 ± 0.6 million years ago and Punu Taipu of 36.1 ± 0.5 million years ago. Such ages are consistent with an age progressive volcanism caused by a hotspot, whose volcano-building activity was influenced by lithospheric anomalies, considering that there is a discontinuity in the chain which would have formed about 43 million years ago at the time of a major change in the motion of the Pacific Plate. The hotspot in question may be the Foundation hotspot, the Pitcairn hotspot or a now extinct third hotspot. Alternatively, the formation of the Tuamotu Plateau may have induced tectonic stress that propagated towards the location of the future Tarava Seamounts.

== Biology ==
Deep-sea animals such as these living on the Tarava Seamounts and their slopes have drawn attention, since they are poorly researched and possibly under threat from climate change and deep-sea mining. The Tarava Seamounts are considered potential mining sites for polymetallic crusts. Several new species have been discovered on the Tarava Seamounts, such as the Lophiodes iwamotoi anglerfish, the cone snail Profundiconus tarava, the majoid crab Samadinia longispina and pectinoid Parvamussium vesiculosum. Numerous deep-sea rissoidae snails have been described from the Tarava Seamounts. Other species found there are Propeamussium watsoni together with five other pectinoids, and tonnoidean gastropods.

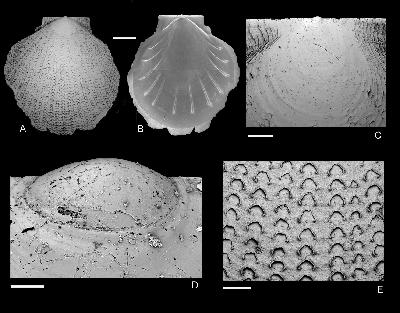
Parvamussium vesiculosum (holotype in MNHN, Paris)
