= Raphitoma alida =

Scientific classification
- Kingdom: Animalia
- Phylum: Mollusca
- Class: Gastropoda
- Subclass: Caenogastropoda
- Order: Neogastropoda
- Superfamily: Conoidea
- Family: Raphitomidae
- Genus: Raphitoma
- Species: R. alida

Binomial name
- Raphitoma alida Pusateri & Giannuzzi-Savelli, 2016

Extinct species of gastropod

Raphitoma alida is an extinct species of sea snail, a marine gastropod mollusc in the family Raphitomidae.

== Description ==
The length of the shell reaches a length of 17.1 mm and a diameter of 7 mm.

== Distribution ==
Fossils of this extinct marine species were found on Sicily, Italy
