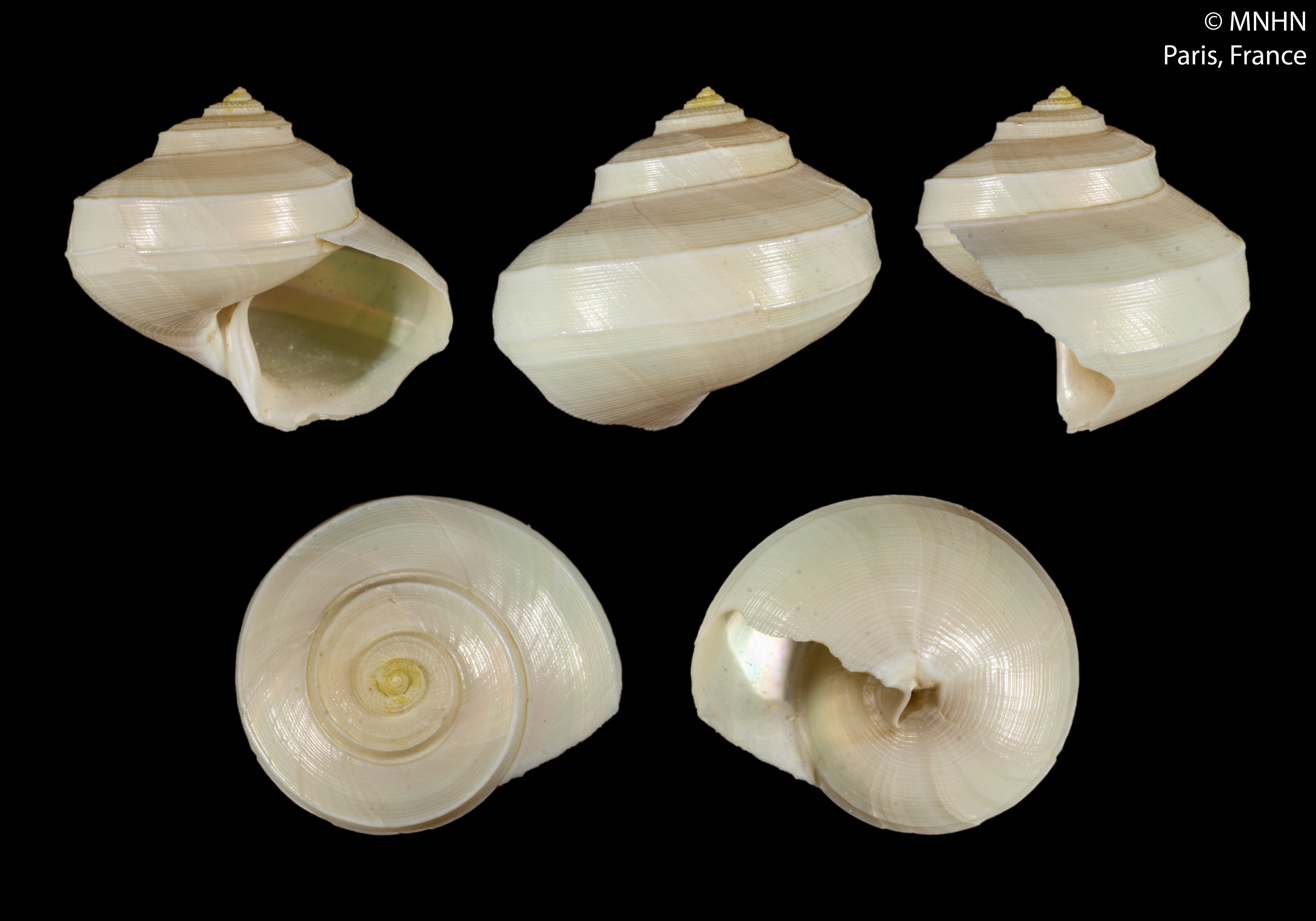
- Shell of Phenacomargarites williamsae (holotype at MNHN, Paris)

Scientific classification
- Kingdom: Animalia
- Phylum: Mollusca
- Class: Gastropoda
- Subclass: Vetigastropoda
- Order: Trochida
- Superfamily: Trochoidea
- Family: Calliostomatidae
- Genus: Phenacomargarites; B. A. Marshall, 2016

Type species
- Phenacomargarites williamsae B. A. Marshall, 2016

= Phenacomargarites =

Genus of gastropods

Phenacomargarites is a genus of sea snails, marine gastropod mollusks, in the subfamily Fautricinae of the family Calliostomatidae within the superfamily Trochoidea, the top snails, turban snails and their allies.

== Species ==
Species within the genus Phenacomargarites include:

- Phenacomargarites incomptus B. A. Marshall, 2016
- Phenacomargarites titan B. A. Marshall, 2016
- Phenacomargarites williamsae B. A. Marshall, 2016
