= Pseudojaminia =

Scientific classification
- Kingdom: Animalia
- Phylum: Mollusca
- Class: Gastropoda
- Order: Stylommatophora
- Family: Enidae
- Genus: Pseudojaminia; Páll-Gergely & Bank, 2016

Genus of molluscs

Pseudojaminia is a genus of gastropods belonging to the family Enidae.

The species of this genus are found in South Europe and near Black Sea.

Species:

- Pseudojaminia arctespira (Mousson, 1874)
- Pseudojaminia blanda (L.Pfeiffer, 1853)
- Pseudojaminia microdon Schütt, 1995
- Pseudojaminia seductilis (Rossmässler, 1837)
- Pseudojaminia tetrodon (Mortillet, 1853) (synonym: Pseudochondrula tetrodon (Mortillet, 1853))
