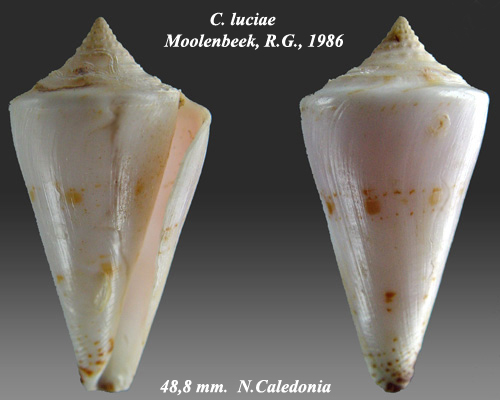
- Apertural and abapertural views of shell of Conus luciae Moolenbeek, R.G., 1986

Conservation status
- Least Concern (IUCN 3.1)

Scientific classification
- Kingdom: Animalia
- Phylum: Mollusca
- Class: Gastropoda
- Subclass: Caenogastropoda
- Order: Neogastropoda
- Superfamily: Conoidea
- Family: Conidae
- Genus: Conus
- Species: C. luciae

Binomial name
- Conus luciae Moolenbeek, 1986

Synonyms
- Conus (Turriconus) luciae Moolenbeek, 1986 · accepted, alternate representation; Kurodaconus luciae (Moolenbeek, 1986); Profundiconus luciae (Moolenbeek, 1986); Turriconus (Kurodaconus) luciae (Moolenbeek, 1986)

= Conus luciae =

Species of sea snail

Conus luciae is a species of sea snail, a marine gastropod mollusk in the family Conidae, the cone snails and their allies.

Like all species within the genus Conus, these snails are predatory and venomous. They are capable of stinging humans, therefore live ones should be handled carefully or not at all.

== Description ==
The shell has an obconic shape with light colouring and small spots. The aperture is notably thin, curving around the exterior. The size of the shell varies between 21 mm and 62 mm.

== Distribution ==
This marine species occurs in the Coral Sea and off New Caledonia.
