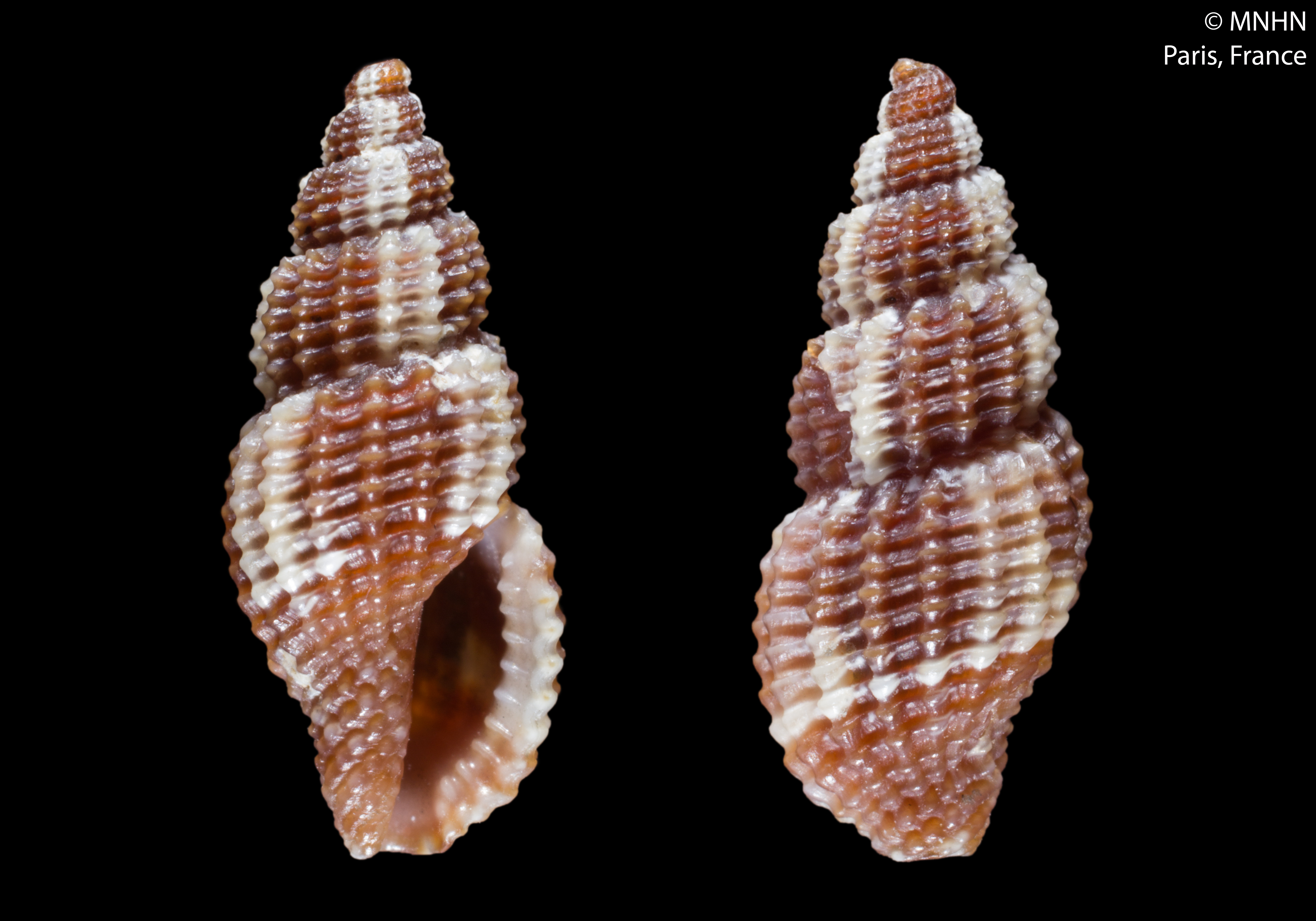
- Shell of Raphitoma bicolor (lectotype at MNHN, Paris)

Scientific classification
- Kingdom: Animalia
- Phylum: Mollusca
- Class: Gastropoda
- Subclass: Caenogastropoda
- Order: Neogastropoda
- Superfamily: Conoidea
- Family: Raphitomidae
- Genus: Raphitoma
- Species: R. bicolor

Binomial name
- Raphitoma bicolor (Risso, 1826)

Synonyms
- Clathurella bicolor Dautzenberg, 1883; Philbertia bicolor Monterosato, 1884; Pleurotoma bicolor Risso, 1826(original combination); Pleurotoma cornea Blainville, 1829; Raphitoma (Cyrtoides) bicolor Nordsieck, 1968

= Raphitoma bicolor =

Species of mollusc

Raphitoma bicolor is a species of sea snail, a marine gastropod mollusc in the family Raphitomidae.

== Description ==
The length varies between 6 mm and 15 mm.

== Distribution ==
The entire Mediterranean Sea; NE Atlantic, from Wales to Canary Islands.
