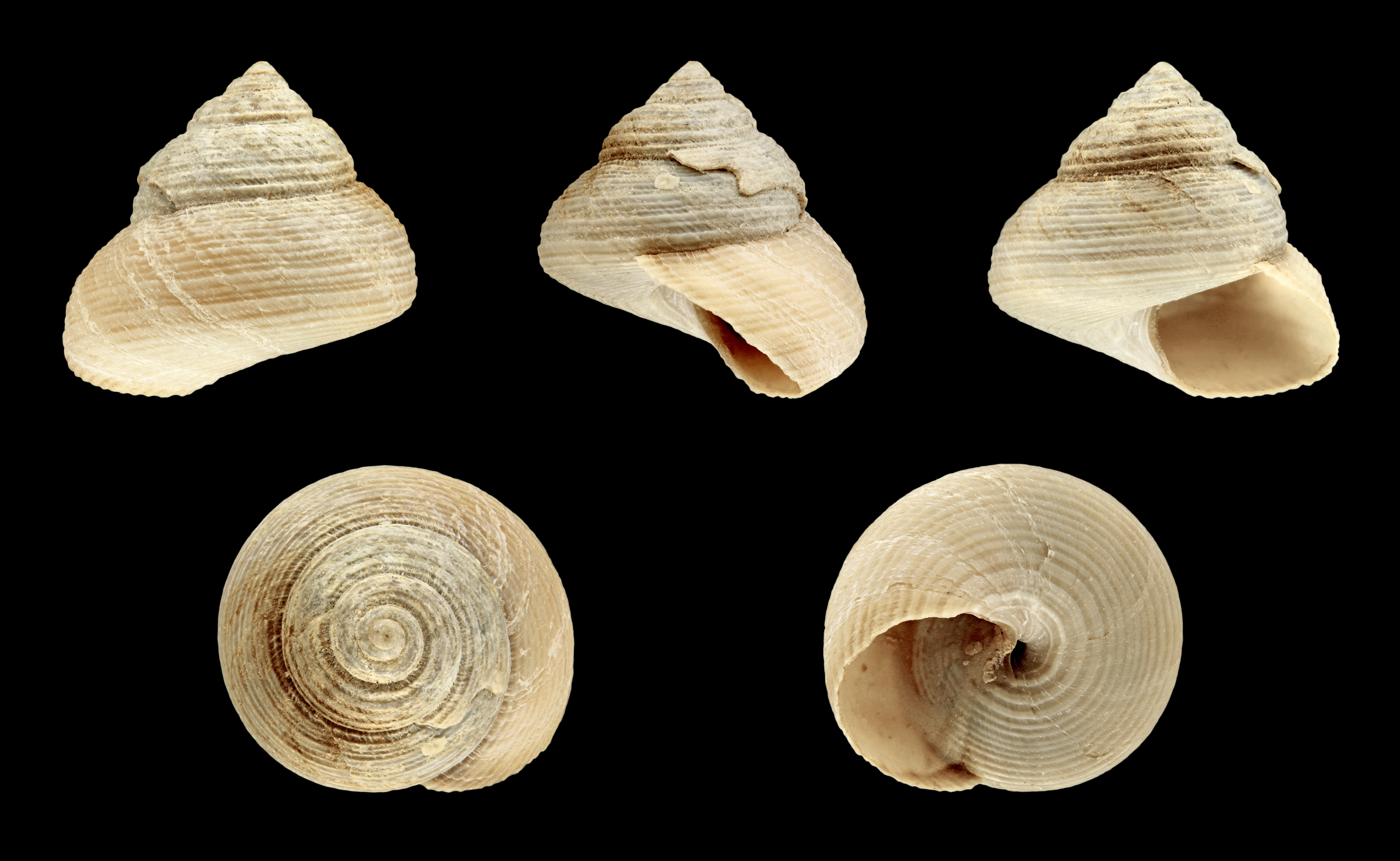
- Margarites pupillus
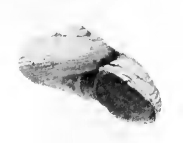
- Apertural view of a shell of Margarites ecarinatus

Scientific classification
- Kingdom: Animalia
- Phylum: Mollusca
- Class: Gastropoda
- Subclass: Vetigastropoda
- Order: Trochida
- Family: Margaritidae
- Genus: Margarites; Gray, 1847

Type species
- Helix margarita Montagu, 1808

Synonyms
- Eumargarita P. Fischer, 1885; Eumargarita (Valvatella) Gray, 1857; Margarita Leach, 1819 (Invalid: junior homonym of Margarita Leach, 1814 [Bivalvia, Pteriidae]); Trochus (Margarita) Leach, 1819 (non Leach, 1814); Valvatella Gray, 1857

= Margarites =

Genus of gastropods

Margarites is a genus of sea snails, marine gastropod mollusks in the family Margaritidae.

This genus belonged previously to the subfamily Margaritinae in the family Turbinidae.

== Description ==
This genus consists of small species of variable size between 3 mm and 15 mm. The Alaskan specimens of Margarites costalis reach almost 25 mm in diameter. Their flat shell has a turbiniform shape with convex whorls and a typical iridescent lustre.

== Species ==
Species within the genus Margarites include:

- Margarites albolineatus (E. A. Smith, 1899)
- Margarites angulatus Galkin, 1955
- Margarites argentatus (Gould, 1841)
- Margarites atlantoides (Quinn, 1992)
- Margarites avachensis Galkin, 1955 [ex Bartsch MS]
- Margarites avenosooki MacGinitie, 1959
- Margarites bairdii (Dall, 1889)
- Margarites biconica Numanami, 1996
- Margarites bisikovi Egorov, 2000
- Margarites cabernet Egorov, 2000
- Margarites calliostomoides Egorov, 2000
- Margarites costalis (Gould, 1841)
- Margarites crebrilirulata (Smith, 1907)
- Margarites dnopherus (Watson, 1879)
- Margarites ecarinatus (Dall, 1919)
- Margarites giganteus (Leche, 1878)
- Margarites glabrus Golikov & Gulbin, 1978
- Margarites groenlandicus (Gmelin, 1791)
- Margarites gunnerusensis Numanami, 1996
- Margarites helicinus (Phipps, 1774)
- Margarites hickmanae J. H. McLean, 1984
- Margarites huloti Vilvens & Sellanes, 2006
- Margarites imperialis Simone & Birman, 2006
- Margarites keepi Smith & Gordon, 1948
- Margarites kophameli (Strebel, 1905)
- Margarites koreanicus (Dall, 1919)
- Margarites laminarum (Jeffreys, 1883)
- Margarites miona Dall, 1927
- Margarites mirabilis Simone & Birman, 2006
- Margarites olivaceus (Brown, 1827)
- Margarites picturatus Golikov, in Golikov & Scarlato, 1967
- Margarites pilsbryi Kuroda & Habe, 1952
- Margarites pribiloffensis (Dall, 1919)
- Margarites pupillus (Gould, 1849)
- Margarites refulgens (Smith, 1907)
- Margarites rossicus Dall, 1919
- Margarites ryukyuensis Okutani, Sasaki & Tsuchida, 2000
- Margarites salmoneus (Carpenter, 1864)
- Margarites schantaricus (Middendorff, 1849)
- Margarites scintillans (Watson, 1879)
- Margarites shinkai Okutani, Tsuchida & Fujikura, 1992
- Margarites simbla Dall, 1913
- Margarites smithi Bartsch, 1927
- Margarites sordidus (Hancock, 1846)
- Margarites striatus (Leach, 1841)
- Margarites toroides Hoffman, van Heugten & Lavaleye, 2011
- Margarites vahlii (Møller, 1842)
- Margarites vityazi Egorov, 2000
- Margarites vorticiferus (Dall, 1873)

Species brought into synonymy

- Margarites acuticostatus Carpenter, 1864: synonym of Parviturbo acuticostatus (Carpenter, 1864)
- Margarites alabastrum "Beck, H.H. MS" Lovén, S.L., 1846: synonym of Calliostoma occidentale (Mighels, J.W. & C.B. Adams, 1842)
- Margarites albula Gould, A.A., 1861: synonym of Solariella obscura (Couthouy, J.P., 1838)
- Margarites beringensis (E. A. Smith, 1899): synonym of Margarites helicinus (Phipps, 1774)
- Margarites biangulosus (A. Adams, 1854): synonym of Minolia biangulosa (A. Adams, 1854)
- Margarites cinereus Filatova, Z.A. & B.I. Zatsepin, 1948: synonym of Margarites costalis (Gould, 1841)
- Margarites clausus Golikov & Gulbin, 1978 : synonym of Cantharidoscops clausus (Golikov & Gulbin, 1978)
- Margarites diaphanus Gray, 1847: synonym of Margarites helicinus (Phipps, 1774)
- Margarites dnopherus Rios, 1994 (non Watson, 1879): synonym of Margarites mirabilis Simone & Birman, 2006
- Margarites dulcis E. A. Smith, 1907: synonym of Antimargarita dulcis (E. A. Smith, 1907)
- Margarites elevatus Dall, 1919: synonym of Margarites helicinus (Phipps, 1774)
- Margarites erythrocoma Dall, 1889: synonym of Pseudostomatella erythrocoma (Dall, 1889)
- Margarites euspira (Dall, 1881): synonym of Bathymophila euspira (Dall, 1881)
- Margarites excavatus Dall, 1919: synonym of Margarites helicinus (Phipps, 1774)
- Margarites expansa Sowerby I, 1838: synonym of Margarella expansa (Sowerby I, 1838)
- Margarites frigidus Dall, 1919: synonym of Cantharidoscops frigidus (Dall, 1919)
- Margarites gemma E.A. Smith, 1915: synonym of Falsimargarita gemma (E.A. Smith, 1915)
- Margarites glauca Möller, H.P.C., 1842: synonym of Margarites olivaceus (Brown, 1827)
- Margarites grosvenori Dall, 1926: synonym of Margarites olivaceus (Brown, 1827)
- Margarites hypolispus Dall, 1919: synonym of Margarites vahlii (Møller, 1842)
- Margarites impervia Strebel, 1908: synonym of Lissotesta impervia (Strebel, 1908)
- Margarites johnsoni Dall, W.H., 1921: synonym of Margarites vahlii (Møller, 1842)
- Margarites kamchaticus Dall, 1919: synonym of Margarites schantaricus (Middendorff, 1849)
- Margarites kurilensis Golikov & Gulbin, 1978: synonym of Margarites groenlandicus kurilensis Golikov & Gulbin, 1978
- Margarites margaritiferus Okutani, 1964: synonym of Solariella margaritifera (Okutani, 1964)
- Margarites marginatus Dall, 1919: synonym of Margarites olivaceus marginatus Dall, 1919
- Margarites mighelsi Rehder, H.A., 1937: synonym of Margarites vahlii (Møller, 1842)
- Margarites minima Seguenza, 1876: synonym of Lissotesta minima (Seguenza, 1876)
- Margarites ochotensis (Philippi, 1846): synonym of Margarites schantaricus (Middendorff, 1849)
- Margarites pauperculus Dall, 1919: synonym of Solariella varicosa (Mighels & Adams, 1842)
- Margarites pruinosa Rochebrune & Mabille, 1885: synonym of Margarella pruinosa (Rochebrune & Mabille, 1885)
- Margarites regalis Verrill & Smith, 1880: synonym of Calliotropis regalis (Verrill & Smith, 1880)
- Margarites rudis Dall, 1919: synonym of Margarites costalis (Gould, 1841)
- Margarites shannonicus Dall, 1919: synonym of Margarites striatus (Leach, 1841)
- Margarites striata striata Galkin, Y.I., 1955: synonym of Margarites costalis (Gould, 1841)
- Margarites umbilicalis Broderip & Sowerby, 1829: synonym of Margarites groenlandicus umbilicalis Broderip & Sowerby, 1829
- Margarites undulatus (G.B. Sowerby, I, 1838): synonym of Margarites groenlandicus (Gmelin, 1791)
- Margarites violacea King & Broderip, 1832: synonym of Margarella violacea (King & Broderip, 1832)
- Margarites vorticifer (Dall, 1873): synonym of Margarites vorticiferus (Dall, 1873)
- Margarites wacei Melvill & Standen, 1918: synonym of Margarella wacei (Melvill & Standen, 1918)

Nomina dubia

- Margarites multilineatus DeKay, 1843
- Margarites ornatus (De Kay, 1843)
- Margarites sigaretinus (Sowerby I, 1838)
