= Margarites cabernet =

Scientific classification
- Kingdom: Animalia
- Phylum: Mollusca
- Class: Gastropoda
- Subclass: Vetigastropoda
- Order: Trochida
- Family: Margaritidae
- Genus: Margarites
- Species: M. cabernet

Binomial name
- Margarites cabernet Egorov, 2000

Species of gastropod

Margarites cabernet is a species of sea snail, a marine gastropod mollusc in the family Margaritidae, genus Margarites. They were also known as 'puppet margarite' or 'little margarite' due to their small size, but have been called margatites or globe snails as well.

== Description ==
Margarites Cabernet likely get their name, Margarites, meaning pearl, and Cabernet, a type of ornamental grass, from their decorative iridescent appearance. They are relatively small in size with the height of the shell at only 7 mm. They are similar in appearance to other snails of their genus and can vary in color, shape, pattern, and size. They are also a deep-sea marine gastropod.

== Diet ==
Like other snails, Margarites Cabernet eat primarily algae including hair, filamentous, red cyanobacteria, and brown diatoms. They will most likely feed on whatever algae is most prevalent in their region of Northern Honshu, Japan.

== Relatives ==
Margarites Cabernet are related to a wide variety of snails from other small sized species like Margarites albolineatus, to their large Alaskan counterparts, Margarites costalis, which can get up to almost 25 mm in diameter.
