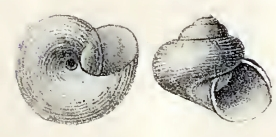
- Drawing with two views of a shell of Margarites argentatus

Scientific classification
- Kingdom: Animalia
- Phylum: Mollusca
- Class: Gastropoda
- Subclass: Vetigastropoda
- Order: Trochida
- Family: Margaritidae
- Genus: Margarites
- Species: M. argentatus

Binomial name
- Margarites argentatus (Gould, 1841)

Synonyms
- Margarita argentata Gould, 1841 (original description); Margarita gigantea Leche, 1878; Trochus argentatus Philippi

= Margarites argentatus =

Species of gastropod

Margarites argentatus is a species of sea snail, a marine gastropod mollusk in the family Margaritidae.

Margarites argentatus var. gigantea Leche, 1878 is accepted as Margarites giganteus (Leche, 1878)

== Description ==
The height of the shell attains 3.5 mm. The small, thin shell is narrowly umbilicate. The spire is globose-depressed, and conoidal. It is subtransparent, corneous or bluish white in color. The surface is lusterless and dull. It is closely marked all over by fine, close-set spiral striae, scarcely visible except under a lens. The blunt apex minute. The four whorls are tumid. The suture is deeply impressed. The circular aperture is oblique. The outer lip is simple and acute. The inner lip is arcuate, a trifle reflexed. The narrow umbilicus is deep.

== Distribution ==
This marine species occurs off the west coast of Scotland and in the northwest Atlantic Ocean.
