= Margarites huloti =

Scientific classification
- Kingdom: Animalia
- Phylum: Mollusca
- Class: Gastropoda
- Subclass: Vetigastropoda
- Order: Trochida
- Family: Margaritidae
- Genus: Margarites
- Species: M. huloti

Binomial name
- Margarites huloti Vilvens & Sellanes, 2006

Species of gastropod

Margarites huloti is a species of sea snail, a marine gastropod mollusk in the family Margaritidae.

== Description ==
Margarites huloti is a species of marine gastropod mollusk in the family Margaritidae. It was first described by Vilvens & Sellanes in 2006 based on specimens recovered from a deep-sea methane seep located off the coast of central Chile (at approximately 36° 21′ S, 73° 43′ W, at depths of 843–728 m).

The shell reaches a maximum height of about 12.5 mm and a diameter of roughly 13.4 mm. It exhibits a moderately high spire, with around 4–5 convex whorls adorned by spiral cords; the base bears 20–25 spiral cords. The umbilicus is funnel-shaped yet narrow. The shell coloration is an iridescent grey, lightening on the last whorl.

As with other gastropods associated with chemosynthetic environments, M. huloti occurs on hard substrates near methane seep ecosystems, where reduced chemical compounds fuel specialized biological communities.

== Distribution ==
This species occurs in the Pacific Ocean off a methane seep near Chile.
