= Margarites pilsbryi =

Scientific classification
- Kingdom: Animalia
- Phylum: Mollusca
- Class: Gastropoda
- Subclass: Vetigastropoda
- Order: Trochida
- Family: Margaritidae
- Genus: Margarites
- Species: M. pilsbryi

Binomial name
- Margarites pilsbryi Kuroda & Habe, 1952

Synonyms
- Margarites (Margarites) helicinus pilsbryi (Kuroda & Habe, 1952)

Species of gastropod

Margarites pilsbryi is a species of sea snail, a marine gastropod mollusk in the family Margaritidae.

== Description ==
It has a flat spiral shell similar to that of a garden snail its size varies from 3 mm to 6 mm. The color of the shell can either be a pinkish red or a light brown.

== Distribution ==
This species occurs in the Sea of Okhotsk and the Sea of Japan.
