= Margarites simbla =

Beehive margarite

Scientific classification
- Kingdom: Animalia
- Phylum: Mollusca
- Class: Gastropoda
- Subclass: Vetigastropoda
- Order: Trochida
- Family: Margaritidae
- Genus: Margarites
- Species: M. simbla

Binomial name
- Margarites simbla Dall, 1913

Species of gastropod

Margarites simbla, common name the beehive margarite, is a species of sea snail, a marine gastropod mollusk in the family Margaritidae.
