= Margarites ryukyuensis =

Conservation status
- Endangered (IUCN 3.1)

Scientific classification
- Kingdom: Animalia
- Phylum: Mollusca
- Class: Gastropoda
- Subclass: Vetigastropoda
- Order: Trochida
- Family: Margaritidae
- Genus: Margarites
- Species: M. ryukyuensis

Binomial name
- Margarites ryukyuensis Okutani, Sasaki & Tsuchida, 2000

Species of gastropod

Margarites ryukyuensis is a species of sea snail, a marine gastropod mollusk in the family Margaritidae.

== Distribution ==
This marine species occurs in the Okinawa Trough.
