= Margarites salmoneus =

Salmon margarite

Scientific classification
- Kingdom: Animalia
- Phylum: Mollusca
- Class: Gastropoda
- Subclass: Vetigastropoda
- Order: Trochida
- Family: Margaritidae
- Genus: Margarites
- Species: M. salmoneus

Binomial name
- Margarites salmoneus (Carpenter, 1864)

Synonyms
- Margarita salmonea Carpenter, 1864

Species of gastropod

Margarites salmoneus, common name the salmon margarite, is a species of sea snail, a marine gastropod mollusk in the family Margaritidae.

== Description ==
The size of the shell varies between 5 mm and 11 mm.

== Distribution ==
This species occurs in the Pacific Ocean from Washington to Southern California, USA.
