= Yonaguni Knoll IV =

Seamount in the Okinawa Trough, east of Taiwan

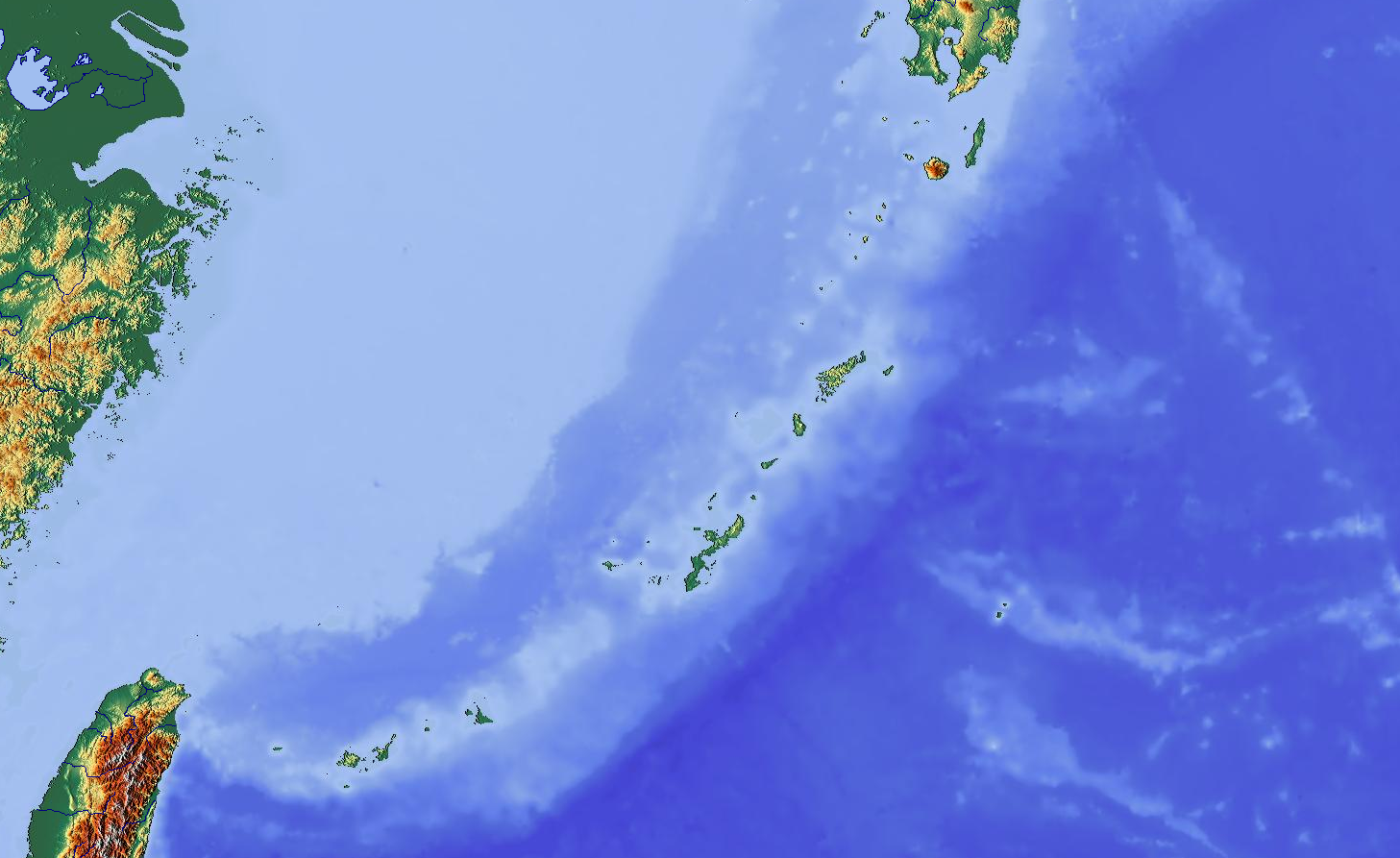
- Location in Okinawa Trough
- Summit depth: 745 metres (2,444 ft)

Location
- Location: Okinawa Trough, east of Taiwan
- Coordinates: 24°54′N 122°48′E

Yonaguni Knoll IV is a seamount in the Okinawa Trough, east of Taiwan. It lies at about 745 metres (2,444 ft) depth and formed through Quaternary volcanism that yielded dacitic and rhyolitic magmas. The seamount is hydrothermally active, with numerous sites that are colonized by mussels and other marine animals. A submarine underground "lake" of liquid carbon dioxide has been identified at Yonaguni Knoll IV.

== Geology and geomorphology ==
Yonaguni Knoll IV (also known as Daiyon-Yonaguni) lies in the southern Okinawa Trough, between Taiwan and Ishigaki Island and northwest of Yonaguni Island. It is a rift presumably linked to back-arc seafloor spreading behind the Ryukyu Trench, where the Philippine Plate subducts beneath the Eurasia Plate. Sediments coming from Asia fill the Okinawa Trough up to 2 kilometres (1.2 mi) thick in its southern sector. Numerous submarine volcanoes and at least 15 hydrothermal systems are known from the trough, where conditions are favourable for hydrothermal activity and which began to open in the Miocene.

The seamount reaches a minimum depth of about 745 metres (2,444 ft). Volcanic rocks from Yonaguni Knoll IV define a calc-alkaline suite of dacite and rhyolite. A thick sediment cover lies on the seamount, which accumulates at a rate of about 0.3 millimetres per year (0.012 in/year) and which is cemented by barite, montmorillonite, quartz and sulfur. A flat, north-northwest-south-southeast trending, 1 kilometre (0.62 mi) long and 500 metres (1,600 ft) wide valley lies southwest of Yonaguni Knoll IV and is covered by mud, except near the vents and the breccia-covered northern slope. It tilts to the southeast, and may represent a geological fault at about 1,400 metres (4,600 ft) depth.

Yonaguni Knoll IV lies at the southwestern end of a northeast–southwest trending chain of volcanic seamounts in the southern Okinawa Trough, and may be a product of the subduction of the Gagua submarine ridge, which commenced in the early Pleistocene and generated a slab window under the Okinawa Trough. There are more than 70 volcanoes in this chain. These volcanoes were active during the Quaternary and erupted dacites and rhyolites. The magma formed through the fractional crystallization mixing of basalt from the mantle and felsic magmas from the crust.

== Hydrothermal venting ==
The area of Yonaguni Knoll IV first drew attention in 1996 during a joint French-Taiwanese expedition on the R/V L'Atalante. Hydrothermal venting at the knoll was discovered in 2000 by the DSV Shinkai 6500 submersible, and the venting of liquid CO_{2} by the same submersible three years later. Liquid CO_{2} was observed venting from the JADE hydrothermal site also in the Okinawa Trough in 1989.

Multiple separate hydrothermal vent sites occur in the valley southwest of Yonaguni Knoll IV; from north to south these are the Lion, Crystal, Tiger, Swallow, Abyss, Carp and Mosquito sites. The first two and the fourth form a group, and Tiger appears to be the main site. It and Lion display chimney-mound complexes up to 10 metres (33 ft) high that erupt water with temperatures exceeding 300 °C (572 °F). The mound at Lion is formed by collapsed chimneys and reaches a height of 20 metres (66 ft). The individual vents have diverse venting styles and produce different hydrothermal fluids. They feature both vents classified as black smokers and as white smokers. Radiometric dating of some vents has indicated ages of a couple of centuries, with one approaching 1000 years.

=== Liquid carbon dioxide ===
The liquid CO_{2} is vented from areas between the Tiger and Swallow vents and at the Crystal site. Liquid CO_{2} appears to pool beneath the seafloor and a "lake" of liquid CO_{2} has been found, buried beneath 20–40 centimetres (8–16 in) thick sediment, 50 metres (160 ft) south of the hydrothermal vents. Given that at such depths CO_{2} is less dense than water, it may be trapped under a layer of CO_{2} hydrate beneath the sediment layers.

=== Origin of the hydrothermal fluids ===
An intense hydrothermal system must exist there to power the various seafloor surface manifestations. Based on heat flow analysis, it appears that the water in the hydrothermal system recharges north of Yonaguni Knoll and emerges on it. Rhyolitic magmas are then leached, thus yielding the mineral content of the hydrothermal vent fluids. The total power output amounts to about 540 megawatt.

The liquid CO_{2} ultimately derives from the hydrothermal fluids but accumulates there before giving rise to the CO_{2} hydrate that eventually produces the liquid droplets, and the hydrothermal fluids vented are not the same as these that give rise to the CO_{2}. The hydrothermal fluids are partitioned underground into separate brine-rich, vapour-rich and residual fluids which rise to the surface and give rise to numerous separate vents. Hydrothermal plumes rise from above the vent sites and the seawater above Yonaguni has unusually high methane concentrations.

=== Hydrothermal deposits ===
Red and yellow sulfur deposits which also contain arsenic are found around the Tiger vent, while hydrothermal crusts cover the seafloor around the Abyss vent. These are deposits of sulfates and sulfides, some of them formed by the collapse of old black smokers. Numerous minerals of elements such as arsenic, barium, copper, iron, lead, manganese and zinc (Note: Alabandite, anhydrite, barite, bornite, calcite, chalcopyrite, covellite, galena, nukudamite, pyrite, rhodochrosite, sphalerite, stibnite, tennanite-tetrahedrite series and wurtzite.) form five different assemblages of mineralization. The assemblages appear to correlate with modes of sulfide/sulfate mineralization. Inversely, silicate and carbonate weathering occurs on pre-existent rocks. The age of the vent deposits reaches 11,000 years.

== Life ==
Hydrothermal communities occur at Yonaguni Knoll IV, with dense assemblages of vent animals at the "Crystal" site and polychaete groups with Sulfurospirillum. The dominant animals in the area are echinoderms including holothurians and starfish, with crabs and mussels found around the vents. Fish, octopuses, polychaetes in tubes, sea anemones and shrimps are also found. Fish, sea spiders, sponges and starfish settle on extinct vents. (Note: Among the species encountered at Yonaguni there are the annellids Alaysia sp., Amage ehlersi, Ampharetidae species, Anobothrus dayi, Brachipolynoe pettiboneae and other Brachipolynoe species, Eclysippe yonaguniensis, Glyphanostomum bilabiatum and Paralvinella species; the arthropods Alvinocais longirostris, Lebbeus shinkaiae, (Note: The shrimp Lebbeus shinkaiae was discovered at Yonaguni Knoll IV and on Hatoma Knoll, also in the Okinawa Trough.) Leucolepas longa Neoverruca sp., Shinkaia crosnieri and Shinkaicaris leurokolos; the bacteria Desulfothermus okinawensis, Hydrogenivirga okinawensis, Hydrogenovibrio crunogenus, Marinitoga okinawensis and Thermosulfidibacter takaii; the bivalve Bathymodiolus platifrons; the galatheid crab Shinkaia crosnieri; the chordates of the zoarcidae family; the echinoderm Ophiambix kagutsuchi; and the gastropods Bathyacmaea secunda, Lepetodrilus nux, Margarites ryukyuensis, Peltospiridae sp., Provanna sp., Puncturella parvinobilis and Pyropelta ryukyuensis.)

Hydrothermal sediments at Yonaguni Knoll IV have diverse microbial communities, with over one billion cells per 1 cm^{3} (0.061 cu in). The exhalations of Yonaguni Knoll IV support chemolithoautotrophs that feed on H_{2}, as the exhalations there are the most H_{2} rich in the Okinawa Trough. Heterotrophic lineages have also been found. Microbial communities have also been sampled from hydrothermal plumes.

The emission of CO_{2} is detrimental to ecosystems on Yonaguni Knoll IV, as there are fewer animals where the emissions take place and hydrates form. On the other hand, a diverse microbial ecosystem has been identified from the margins of the liquid CO_{2} "lake".
