= Margarites pribiloffensis =

Pribiloff margarite

Scientific classification
- Kingdom: Animalia
- Phylum: Mollusca
- Class: Gastropoda
- Subclass: Vetigastropoda
- Order: Trochida
- Family: Margaritidae
- Genus: Margarites
- Species: M. pribiloffensis

Binomial name
- Margarites pribiloffensis (Dall, 1919)

Species of gastropod

Margarites pribiloffensis, common name the Pribiloff margarite, is a species of sea snail, a marine gastropod mollusk in the family Margaritidae.

== Description ==
The height of the shell attains 8 mm, its diameter 8.5 mm. The small, solid shell has a trochiform shape. It is pale straw color, with a small glassy nucleus and about 5½ subsequent well rounded whorls. The suture is distinct, and slightly appressed. The surface is dull, with fine incremental lines crossed by extremely fine spiral striae. The base is well rounded with a deep, not funicular umbilicus. The simple aperture is rounded. The outer lip produced at the suture and united with the columella by a thin glaze of enamel over the body. The inner lip is a little thickened, not reflected. The operculum is brownish with eight or more turns.

== Distribution ==
This species occurs in arctic waters.
