= Margarites sordidus =

Scientific classification
- Kingdom: Animalia
- Phylum: Mollusca
- Class: Gastropoda
- Subclass: Vetigastropoda
- Order: Trochida
- Family: Margaritidae
- Genus: Margarites
- Species: M. sordidus

Binomial name
- Margarites sordidus (Hancock, 1846)

Synonyms
- Margarita sordida Hancock, 1846

Species of gastropod

Margarites sordidus is a species of sea snail, a marine gastropod mollusk in the family Margaritidae.

== Distribution ==
This species occurs in the Atlantic Ocean off Nova Scotia, Canada.
