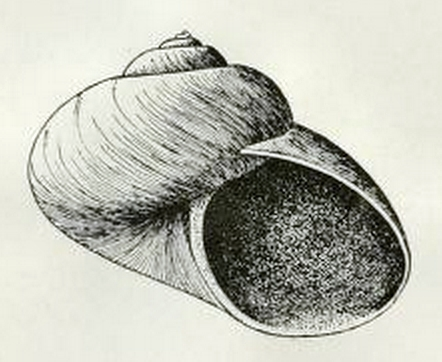
- Drawing with an apertural view of a shell of Margarites helicinus

Scientific classification
- Kingdom: Animalia
- Phylum: Mollusca
- Class: Gastropoda
- Subclass: Vetigastropoda
- Order: Trochida
- Family: Margaritidae
- Genus: Margarites
- Species: M. helicinus

Binomial name
- Margarites helicinus (Phipps, 1774)

Synonyms
- Clio helicinus Phipps, 1774; Eumargarita helicinus Phipps, 1774; Eumargarites helicinus (Phipps, 1774); Helix margarita Montagu, 1808; Margarita arctica Leach, 1819; Margarita campanulata Packard, 1867; Margarita communis W. Thompson, 1844; Margarita depressior Middendorff, 1849; Margarita helicina (Phipps, 1774); Margarita helicoides Sowerby I, 1838; Margarita major Middendorff, 1848; Margarita normalis Middendorff, 1849; Margarita typica Middendorff, 1849; Margarita vulgaris Sowerby I, 1838; Margarites albolineatus Smith, E.A., 1899; Margarites beringensis (E. A. Smith, 1899); Margarites diaphanus Gray, 1847; Margarites elevatus Dall, 1919; Margarites excavatus Dall, 1919; Paludina inflatus Totten, 1834; Trochus fasciatus Jeffreys, 1865; Trochus helicinus Fabricius, 1780; Trochus neritoideus Gmelin, 1791; Turbo helicinus Phipps, 1774 (original combination); Turbo inflatus Totten, 1834; Turbo margarita Montagu, 1808; Valvatella albolineata E. A. Smith, 1899; Valvatella beringensis E. A. Smith, 1899

= Margarites helicinus =

Species of gastropod

Margarites helicinus, common name the helicina margarite or spiral margarite, is a species of sea snail, a marine gastropod mollusk in the family Margaritidae.

Margarites helicinus has been established by Phipps in 1774 and not by Fabricus in 1780 as Winchworth (1932), Sneli (1970) (and others) mention.

Dall established in 1919 two varieties, but both have become synonyms of Margarites helicinus.

- Margarites helicinus var. elevatus Dall, 1919
- Margarites helicinus var. excavatus Dall, 1919

== Description ==
The size of the shell varies between 3. mm and 11 mm. The umbilicate, thin shell has a depressed-conoidal shape. It is flesh-colored, with paler at periphery and below the suture, fading into corneous around the umbilicus. The surface is very bright, shining, polished, and smooth except for fine subobsolete concentric lines around the umbilicus. The spire is conoidal. The apex is minute but obtuse. The suture is impressed. The shell contains about 5 convex whorls, the last very rapidly widening, somewhat descending toward the aperture. The rounded aperture is oblique, angular above, nacreous inside. The pearly iridescence is often visible through the shell. The narrow umbilicus is profound. Its opening is regularly curved, not separated from the base by a carina.

== Distribution ==
This marine species occurs near the seashore in circum-arctic waters, in the North Atlantic, in European waters; from the Bering Strait to California, USA; in the Sea of Okhotsk.

== Spawning and development ==
Spawning takes place during the spring in the San Juan Islands, WA, USA. Prior to spawning two to four snails move close together, one of these is a female and all others are male. A female release eggs only when close to a male. Eggs are released in a mucus strand 2–3 eggs wide. Eggs are orange to pinkish red, 180–200 μm in diameter, and each egg is covered by a gelatinous layer 10–30 μm thick. Sperm release is not visible during spawning but must occur since eggs in newly produced egg masses are fertilized. The female uses the leading edge of her foot to form the mucus strand into a globular egg mass 0.5–1.5 cm in diameter. Each egg masses contains 90–1000 eggs, and egg masses are anchored to algal surfaces at both ends of the egg mass.

All embryonic and larval development takes place in the egg mass and young emerge as juvenile snails. Development proceeds as eggs undergo spiral cleavage. Timing of development at 7–9 °C proceeds as embryos reached the gastrula stage 1.3 days after fertilization, the trochophore stage 2.1 days after fertilization, the veliger stage 3.3 days after fertilization, torsion between 4.5–5 days after fertilization, metamorphosis at 10.5 days, and hatched and crawled out of the egg mass as a juvenile snail at 12.1 days.

Shells of newly emergent juvenile snails are 270–300 μm long.
