= Margarites vityazi =

Scientific classification
- Kingdom: Animalia
- Phylum: Mollusca
- Class: Gastropoda
- Subclass: Vetigastropoda
- Order: Trochida
- Family: Margaritidae
- Genus: Margarites
- Species: M. vityazi

Binomial name
- Margarites vityazi Egorov, 2000

Species of gastropod

Margarites vityazi is a species of sea snail, a marine gastropod mollusk in the family Margaritidae.

== Description ==
The height of the shell attains 8 mm.

== Distribution ==
This marine species occurs south of Alaska.
