= M. striatus =

M. striatus may refer to:

- Mantidactylus striatus, a frog species endemic to Madagascar
- Margarites striatus, a sea snail species
