= Margarites imperialis =

Scientific classification
- Kingdom: Animalia
- Phylum: Mollusca
- Class: Gastropoda
- Subclass: Vetigastropoda
- Order: Trochida
- Family: Margaritidae
- Genus: Margarites
- Species: M. imperialis

Binomial name
- Margarites imperialis Simone & Birman, 2006

Species of gastropod

Margarites imperialis is a species of sea snail, a marine gastropod mollusk in the family Margaritidae.

== Description ==
The height of the shell attains 9.6 mm, its diameter 8.8 mm.

== Distribution ==
This species occurs in the Atlantic Ocean off Brazil at depths between 640 m and 900 m.
