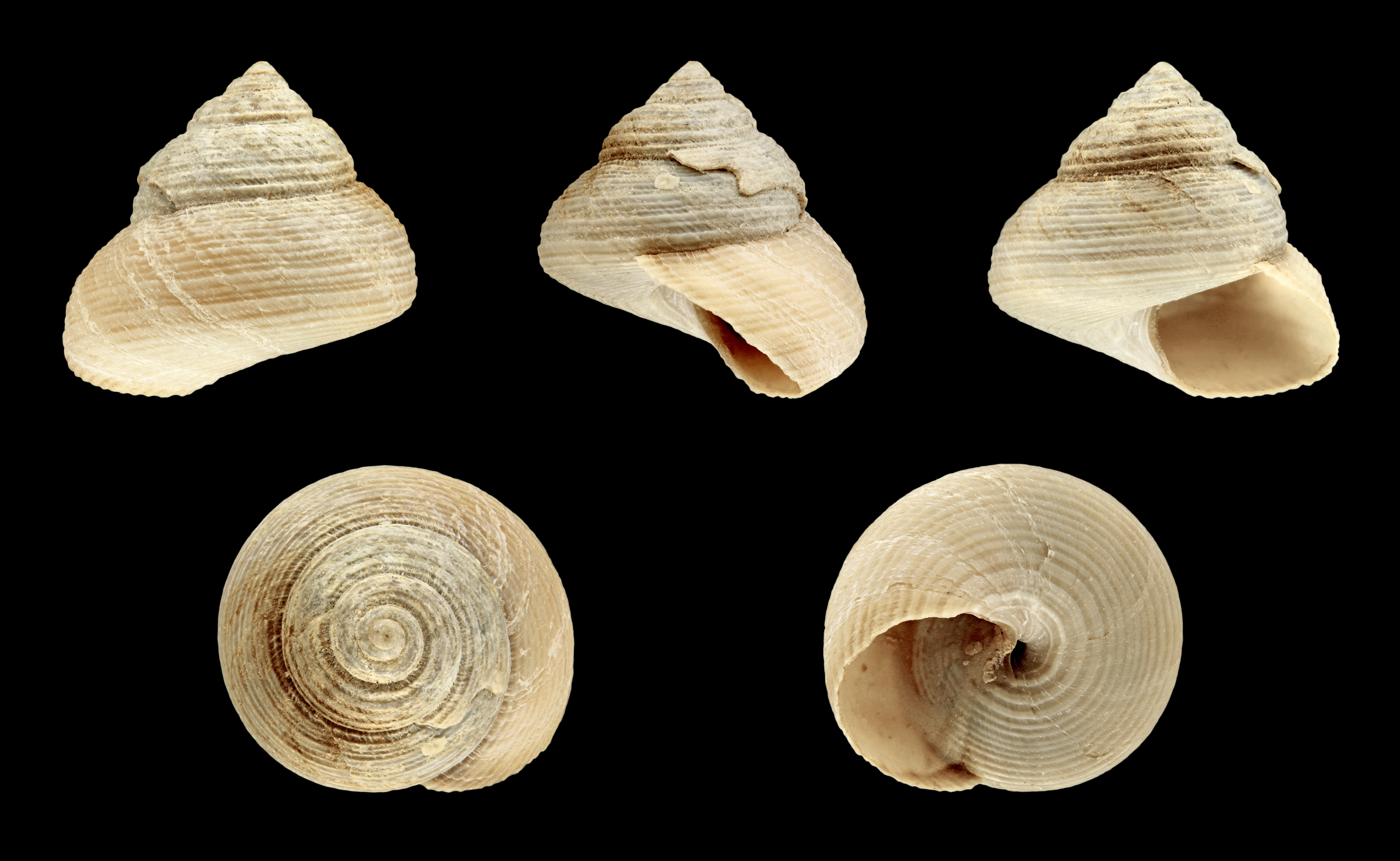
- Five views of a shell of Margarites pupillus

Scientific classification
- Kingdom: Animalia
- Phylum: Mollusca
- Class: Gastropoda
- Subclass: Vetigastropoda
- Order: Trochida
- Family: Margaritidae
- Genus: Margarites
- Species: M. pupillus

Binomial name
- Margarites pupillus (Gould, 1849)

Synonyms
- Margarita callostoma A. Adams, 1851; Margarita inflata Carpenter, 1865; Margarita pupilla Gould, 1849; Margarita salmonea Carpenter, 1864

= Margarites pupillus =

Species of gastropod

Margarites pupillus, common name the puppet margarite or the little margarite, is a species of sea snail, a marine gastropod mollusk in the family Margaritidae, the turban snails.

== Description ==
The size of the shell varies between 8 mm and 20 mm. The solid shell has a conical shape and is narrowly umbilicated. It is lusterless, ashen or whitish. It is a very variable shell. Southward the color becomes deeper, of a salmon hue, and the sculpture finer. The surface is spirally traversed by unequal cord-like lirae, separated by sharply crispate-striate interspaces, as wide or wider than the ridges. The latter are nearly smooth or show traces of the oblique striation. Upon the last 1½ whorls there is usually a spiral thread in the inter-liral spaces. Above this there are 4 or 5 lirae on each whorl. Upon the base the concentric riblets decrease regularly in size from the center outward, and number about 12. The spire is elevated. The apex is subacute. The sutures are impressed. The 6 whorls are convex, the last obtusely angled, flattened beneath. The aperture is very oblique, rounded, iridescent inside. The peristome is simple. The columella is arcuate, subreflexed at the umbilicus, often nearly closing it, united with the upper termination of the lip by a parietal callus. The funnel-shaped umbilicus is bounded by a carina. Its perforation is very small.

== Distribution ==
This marine species occurs from the Bering Sea to Southern California, USA, from the low intertidal zone to 100 meters.}

== Ecology and behavior ==
Population density: The subtidal population density of Margarites pupillus in the San Juan Islands, WA, USA, is linked to the abundance of kelp, primarily Agarum fimbriatum. Densities of over 400 snails per square meter can occur where kelp density provides 100% bottom cover, and snail density declines to only a few snails per square meter below the algal zone.

Diet: This snail is a generalist grazer; gut contents showed that the digestive tract of all snails examined contained unidentifiable detritus and silt and sand, 94% contained unidentified filamentous red algae, 86% contained diatoms, 79% contained sponge spicules, 64% contained filamentous brown algae, 21% contained remains of hydroids, 14% had remains of bryozoans, and 7% contained filamentous green algae. There was no evidence that M. pupils feeds on Agarum on which it lives.

Predators: The crabs Cancer productus and Cancer oregonensis, and the seastar Leptasterias hexactis readily preyed on M. pupillus during laboratory experiments. Other prospective predators that did not prey on M. pupillus during lab trials include the gastropods Fusitriton oregonensis, Ceratostoma foliatum, Searlesia dira, and Amphissa columbiana, seastars Pycnopodia helianthoides, Pisaster ochraceus, Evasterias troschelii, Solaster stimpsoni, and Dermasterias imbricata, though S. dira is reportedly a predator on these snails.

Anti-predator behavior: The behavioral responses of M. pupillus to predators are specific to the kind of predator it engages. It exhibits a rapid flight response with increased rates of movement of up to 9.5 cm/min accompanied by shell twisting after coming onto physical contact with seastars, e.g., L. hexactis, 'E. troschelli, and "P. ochraceus. The predatory snail F. oregonensis also elicited a rapid flight response though it did not consume M. pupillus during lab experiments. When M. pupillus comes in contact with a predatory crab however, e.g.,C. oregonensis, it withdraws rapidly into its shell and relies solely on physical defense .

Habitat preference: Margarites pupillus is found among kelp beds of the large brown kelp A. fimbriatum in the San Juan Islands, WA, USA. These snails are typically found on the upper surfaces of kelp rather than on the bottom beneath it. Evidence suggests that the kelp provides a safe haven for these snails where they are separated from benthic predators, especially crabs. Gut analyses of local crab-eating fishes including kelp greenling and cabezon sculpin showed that 85% of all guts analyzed contained remains of crabs, including those known to prey on M. pupillus while only 2% contained operculi of M. pupillus. These results suggest that crabs probably avoid upper surfaces of kelp where they would be more exposed to fish predation, making them safer places for snails to live.
