= Anomphalogaza moluccensis =

Scientific classification
- Kingdom: Animalia
- Phylum: Mollusca
- Class: Gastropoda
- Subclass: Vetigastropoda
- Order: Trochida
- Superfamily: Trochoidea
- Family: Margaritidae
- Genus: Anomphalogaza
- Species: A. moluccensis

Binomial name
- Anomphalogaza moluccensis Hickman, 2012

Species of gastropod

Anomphalogaza moluccensis is a species of sea snail, a marine gastropod mollusk in the family Margaritidae.
