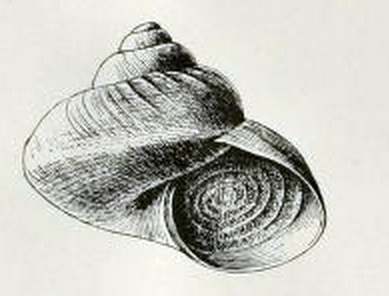
- Drawing with an apertural view of a shell of Margarites olivaceus marginatus

Scientific classification
- Kingdom: Animalia
- Phylum: Mollusca
- Class: Gastropoda
- Subclass: Vetigastropoda
- Order: Trochida
- Family: Margaritidae
- Genus: Margarites
- Species: M. olivaceus

Binomial name
- Margarites olivaceus (Brown, 1827)

Synonyms
- Eumargarita olivaceus (Brown, 1827); Margarita glauca Möller, 1842; Margarita harrisoni Hancock, 1846; Margarites glauca Möller, H.P.C., 1842; Margarites grosvenori Dall, 1926; Solariella olivaceus (Brown, 1827); Trochus argentatus Gould, A.A., 1841; Trochus glaucus (Möller, 1842); Turbo olivaceus Brown, 1827

= Margarites olivaceus =

Species of gastropod

Margarites olivaceus, common name the eastern olive margarite, is a species of sea snail, a marine gastropod mollusk in the family Margaritidae.

Subspecies

- Margarites olivaceus marginatus Dall, 1919
- Margarites olivaceus olivaceus (Brown, 1827)

== Description ==
The size of the shell varies between 2 mm and 4 mm.

== Distribution ==
This species occurs in circum-arctic waters; in the North Atlantic Ocean; in the Pacific Ocean off Oregon, USA; in the Sea of Japan
