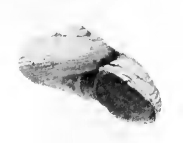
- Original image of the shell of Margarites ecarinatus

Scientific classification
- Kingdom: Animalia
- Phylum: Mollusca
- Class: Gastropoda
- Subclass: Vetigastropoda
- Order: Trochida
- Family: Margaritidae
- Genus: Margarites
- Species: M. ecarinatus

Binomial name
- Margarites ecarinatus Dall, 1919

= Margarites ecarinatus =

Species of gastropod

Margarites ecarinatus is a species of sea snail, a marine gastropod mollusk in the family Margaritidae.

== Description ==
The height of the shell attains 8 mm. The pinkish grey shell is depressed. It has about five rapidly enlarging whorls. The glassy nucleus is minute. The subsequent whorls are moderately inflated. They are separated by a deep but not channelled suture, having a rounded periphery, a wide, completely pervious umbilicus, and a large, very oblique, iridescent aperture. The axial sculpture consists of very fine silky incremental lines. The spiral sculpture consists of low flattish threads separated by narrower interspaces sometimes carrying a finer intercalary thread. This sculpture is carried over the base but is absent from the walls of the wide umbilicus;. The rounded aperture is very oblique. Its margins are sharp, hardly meeting over the body except by a thin layer of enamel. The brown operculum is thin, and multispiral.
