= Margarites mirabilis =

Scientific classification
- Kingdom: Animalia
- Phylum: Mollusca
- Class: Gastropoda
- Subclass: Vetigastropoda
- Order: Trochida
- Family: Margaritidae
- Genus: Margarites
- Species: M. mirabilis

Binomial name
- Margarites mirabilis Simone & Birman, 2006

Synonyms
- Margarites dnopherus auct. non Watson, 1879

Species of gastropod

Margarites mirabilis is a small species of sea snail, a marine gastropod mollusk in the family Margaritidae.

== Description ==
The height of the shell attains 13.3 mm.

== Distribution ==
This species occurs in the Atlantic Ocean off Brazil at depths between 85 m and 90 m.
