= Margarites calliostomoides =

Scientific classification
- Kingdom: Animalia
- Phylum: Mollusca
- Class: Gastropoda
- Subclass: Vetigastropoda
- Order: Trochida
- Family: Margaritidae
- Genus: Margarites
- Species: M. calliostomoides

Binomial name
- Margarites calliostomoides Egorov, 2000

Species of gastropod

Margarites calliostomoides is a species of sea snail, a marine gastropod mollusk in the family Margaritidae.

== Description ==
The height of the shell attains 14 mm.

== Distribution ==
This marine species occurs off the Kurile Islands, Russia.
