= Margarites picturatus =

Scientific classification
- Kingdom: Animalia
- Phylum: Mollusca
- Class: Gastropoda
- Subclass: Vetigastropoda
- Order: Trochida
- Family: Margaritidae
- Genus: Margarites
- Species: M. picturatus

Binomial name
- Margarites picturatus Golikov, in Golikov & Scarlato, 1967

Synonyms
- Margarites (Margarites) picturata Golikov, 1967

Species of gastropod

Margarites picturatus is a species of sea snail, a marine gastropod mollusk in the family Margaritidae.

== Description ==
The height of the shell attains 3 mm.

== Distribution ==
This species occurs in the Sea of Japan.
