= Margarites keepi =

Keep margarite

Scientific classification
- Kingdom: Animalia
- Phylum: Mollusca
- Class: Gastropoda
- Subclass: Vetigastropoda
- Order: Trochida
- Family: Margaritidae
- Genus: Margarites
- Species: M. keepi

Binomial name
- Margarites keepi Smith & Gordon, 1948

Species of gastropod

Margarites keepi, common name the Keep margarite, is a species of sea snail, a marine gastropod mollusk in the family Margaritidae.

== Description ==
The height of the shell attains 2 mm, its diameter is 2.1 mm.

== Distribution ==
This species occurs in the Pacific Ocean off California, USA.
