= Margarites glabrus =

Scientific classification
- Kingdom: Animalia
- Phylum: Mollusca
- Class: Gastropoda
- Subclass: Vetigastropoda
- Order: Trochida
- Family: Margaritidae
- Genus: Margarites
- Species: M. glabrus

Binomial name
- Margarites glabrus Golikov & Gulbin, 1978

Species of gastropod

Margarites glabrus is a species of sea snail, a marine gastropod mollusk in the family Margaritidae.

== Description ==
The height of the shell attains 5 mm.

== Distribution ==
This species occurs in the arctic waters of the Pacific Ocean.

== Habitat ==
This species is found in the following habitats:

- brackish
- marine
