= Margarites biconica =

Scientific classification
- Kingdom: Animalia
- Phylum: Mollusca
- Class: Gastropoda
- Subclass: Vetigastropoda
- Order: Trochida
- Family: Margaritidae
- Genus: Margarites
- Species: M. biconica

Binomial name
- Margarites biconica Numanami, 1996

Species of gastropod

Margarites biconica is a species of sea snail, a marine gastropod mollusk in the family Margaritidae.

== Description ==
The height of the shell attains 8 mm.

== Distribution ==
This species occurs in the Weddell Sea, Antarctica, at depths between 155 m and 480 m.
