= Margarites atlantoides =

Scientific classification
- Kingdom: Animalia
- Phylum: Mollusca
- Class: Gastropoda
- Subclass: Vetigastropoda
- Order: Trochida
- Family: Margaritidae
- Genus: Margarites
- Species: M. atlantoides

Binomial name
- Margarites atlantoides (Quinn, 1992)

Synonyms
- Calliostoma atlantoides Quinn, 1992

Species of gastropod

Margarites atlantoides is a species of sea snail, a marine gastropod mollusk in the family Margaritidae.

== Description ==
The height of the shell attains 10 mm.

== Distribution ==
This marine species occurs off the Lesser Antilles at a depth of 500 m.
