= Antimargarita smithiana =

Scientific classification
- Kingdom: Animalia
- Phylum: Mollusca
- Class: Gastropoda
- Subclass: Vetigastropoda
- Order: Trochida
- Family: Margaritidae
- Genus: Antimargarita
- Species: A. smithiana

Binomial name
- Antimargarita smithiana (Hedley, 1916)

Synonyms
- Antimargarita smithiana Powell, 1951; Submargarita smithiana Hedley, 1916

Species of gastropod

Antimargarita smithiana is a species of sea snail, a marine gastropod mollusk in the family Margaritidae.

== Distribution ==
This marine species occurs off East Antarctica and in the Bellinghausen Sea at depths between 30 m and 1117 m.
