= Margarites refulgens =

Scientific classification
- Kingdom: Animalia
- Phylum: Mollusca
- Class: Gastropoda
- Subclass: Vetigastropoda
- Order: Trochida
- Family: Margaritidae
- Genus: Margarites
- Species: M. refulgens

Binomial name
- Margarites refulgens (E.A. Smith, 1907)

Synonyms
- Margarella expansa J. Gaillard, 1954; Margarella refulgens (E. A. Smith, 1907); Valvatella refulgens E. A. Smith, 1907 (original combination)

Species of gastropod

Margarites refulgens is a species of sea snail, a marine gastropod mollusk in the family Margaritidae, the turban snails.

== Description ==
The height of the shell attains 6 mm, its diameter is also 6 mm.

Margarites refulgens has a unaccepted status, and its accepted name is Margarella refulgens.

== Distribution ==
This species occurs in Antarctic waters (the Weddell Sea) and subantarctic waters off the South Sandwich Islands at depths between 200 m and 1,100 m.
