= Margarites smithi =

Smith margarite

Scientific classification
- Kingdom: Animalia
- Phylum: Mollusca
- Class: Gastropoda
- Subclass: Vetigastropoda
- Order: Trochida
- Family: Margaritidae
- Genus: Margarites
- Species: M. smithi

Binomial name
- Margarites smithi Bartsch, 1927

Synonyms
- Margarites (Lirularia ?) smithi Bartsch, 1927

Species of gastropod

Margarites smithi, common name the Smith margarite, is a species of sea snail, a marine gastropod mollusk in the family Margaritidae.

== Description ==
The height of the shell attains 1.6 mm, its diameter 1.7 mm.

== Distribution ==
The type of this marine species was collected off Monterey, California.
