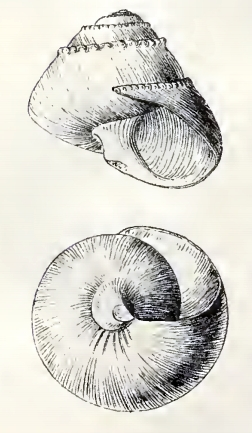
- Original drawing with two views of a shell of Margarites bairdii

Scientific classification
- Kingdom: Animalia
- Phylum: Mollusca
- Class: Gastropoda
- Subclass: Vetigastropoda
- Order: Trochida
- Family: Margaritidae
- Genus: Margarites
- Species: M. bairdii

Binomial name
- Margarites bairdii (Dall, 1889)

Synonyms
- Margarites (Bathymophila) bairdi (Dall, 1889); Umbonium bairdii Dall, 1889

= Margarites bairdii =

Baird's margarite

Species of gastropod

Margarites bairdii, common name Baird's margarite, is a species of sea snail, a marine gastropod mollusk in the family Margaritidae.

== Description ==
(Original description by W.H. Dall) The height of the shell attains 4 mm, its diameter 5 mm. The small, white shell has a depressed conic shape. it is polished, externally porcellanous, internally slightly nacreous. The globular nucleus is dextral. The spire contains 5 or more whorls. The radiating sculpture consists of occasional faint impressed incremental lines. The spiral sculpture consists of occasional microscopic striae, and a single strap-like band appressed to the suture. It bears numerous flattish squarish nodules or elevations, which coronate the whorls. The periphery is rounded. The base of the shell is rounded, depressed in the center, which is nearly filled with a mass of white callus having a very finely granular surface. The granular surface of the callus is common to the young of other species, and is lost in the adult. The ovate aperture has a simple, thin, oblique margin.

== Distribution ==
This species occurs in the Gulf of Mexico and in the Caribbean Sea.
