= Margarites rossicus =

Scientific classification
- Kingdom: Animalia
- Phylum: Mollusca
- Class: Gastropoda
- Subclass: Vetigastropoda
- Order: Trochida
- Family: Margaritidae
- Genus: Margarites
- Species: M. rossicus

Binomial name
- Margarites rossicus Dall, 1919

Synonyms
- Calliostoma rossica (Dall, 1919); Margarites (Pupillaria) rossica Dall, 1919 (original description); Otukaia rossica (Dall, 1919)

Species of gastropod

Margarites rossicus, common name : the pearly margarite, is a species of sea snail, a marine gastropod mollusk in the family Margaritidae.

There are two subspecies:

- Margarites rossicus derjugini Galkin, 1955 [ex Bartsch MS]
- Margarites rossicus rossicus Dall, 1919

Some authors place this species in the subgenus Margarites (Pupillaria)

== Description ==
The shell grows to a length of 32 mm, its diameter 30 mm. The large, solid shell has a trochiform shape. It has a pale gray color over a brilliant nacre. It contains 8 whorls, including a small pinkish nucleus of two whorls. The spiral sculpture consists of (on the spire three) strong blunt keels, of which two near the periphery are the most prominent, with subequal wide interspaces. There is a fourth less prominent one on which the suture is laid which only shows on the body whorl. On the base there are about 10 smaller cords irregularly spaced. The axis is perforate by a narrow twisted umbilicus. The axial sculpture consists of very fine close uniform sharp incremental lines. The simple aperture is rounded-quadrate. The thin outer lip is sharp, undulated by the sculpture. The body of the shell is lightly glazed. The inner lip is slightly tortuous, hardly thickened, with a slight angle at the anterior end.

== Distribution ==
This species occurs in the Eastern Russian Arctic waters and off Southern Hokkaido at depths between 50 m and 550 m.
