= Margarites gunnerusensis =

Scientific classification
- Kingdom: Animalia
- Phylum: Mollusca
- Class: Gastropoda
- Subclass: Vetigastropoda
- Order: Trochida
- Family: Margaritidae
- Genus: Margarites
- Species: M. gunnerusensis

Binomial name
- Margarites gunnerusensis Numanami, 1996

Species of gastropod

Margarites gunnerusensis is a species of sea snail, a marine gastropod mollusk in the family Margaritidae.

== Distribution ==
This species occurs in Antarctic waters.
