= Margarites angulatus =

Scientific classification
- Kingdom: Animalia
- Phylum: Mollusca
- Class: Gastropoda
- Subclass: Vetigastropoda
- Order: Trochida
- Family: Margaritidae
- Genus: Margarites
- Species: M. angulatus

Binomial name
- Margarites angulatus Galkin, 1955

Synonyms
- Margarites (Margarites) vahlii angulata Galkin, 1955

Species of gastropod

Margarites angulatus is a species of sea snail, a marine gastropod mollusk in the family Margaritidae.
