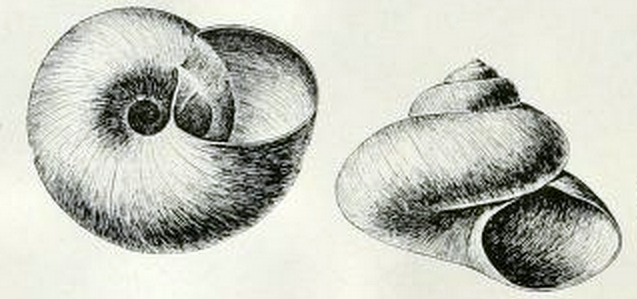
- Drawing with two views of a shell of Margarites groenlandicus umbilicalis

Scientific classification
- Kingdom: Animalia
- Phylum: Mollusca
- Class: Gastropoda
- Subclass: Vetigastropoda
- Order: Trochida
- Family: Margaritidae
- Genus: Margarites
- Species: M. groenlandicus

Binomial name
- Margarites groenlandicus (Gmelin, 1791)

Synonyms
- Eumargarita (Valvatella) groenlandica (Gmelin, 1791); Margarita carnea (R.T. Lowe, 1825) (a junior synonym); Margarita costellata G. B. Sowerby I, 1838 (dubious synonym); Margarita groenlandicus Gmelin, 1791; Margarita groenlandica spiralis Baker, 1919; Margarita groenlandica var. rudis Mörch, 1869; Margarita sulcata Sowerby I, 1838; Margarita undulata G. B. Sowerby I, 1838; Margarites (Margarites) groenlandica (Gmelin, 1791) · alternate representation (unaccepted combination); Margarites shannonicus Dall, 1919; Margarites spiralis F. C. Baker, 1919; Margarites striatus (Leach, 1819) ·; Margarites undulatus (G.B. Sowerby, I, 1838); Trochus carneus (R.T. Lowe, 1825) junior subjective synonym (a junior synonym); Trochus fabricii Philippi, 1850 (a junior synonym); Trochus groenlandicus Gmelin, 1791 (original combination); Trochus groenlandicus var. albida Jeffreys, 1865; Trochus groenlandicus var. dilatata Jeffreys, 1865; Trochus groenlandicus var. laevior Jeffreys, 1865; Trochus rossi Philippi, 1852; Trochus umbilicalis Broderip & Sowerby, 1829 Margarites undulata (G.B. Sowerby, I, 1838); Trochus undulatus (G.B. Sowerby I, 1838); Turbo carneus R. T. Lowe, 1825; Turbo incarnatus Couthouy, 1838 ·

= Margarites groenlandicus =

Species of gastropod

Margarites groenlandicus, common name the Greenland margarite or wavy top shell, is a species of sea snail, a marine gastropod mollusk in the family Margaritidae.

There are two subspecies :

- Margarites groenlandicus groenlandicus (Gmelin, 1791)
- Margarites groenlandicus kurilensis Golikov & Gulbin, 1978
- Margarites groenlandicus umbilicalis Broderip & Sowerby, 1829 (synonym : Margarites umbilicalis Broderip & Sowerby, 1829)

== Description ==
The wavy top shell is thin-shelled and rather small with a maximum length of 1.9 cm (¾ inch) and a compressed spire. The color of the glossy shell is cream to brown. It contains 4-5 whorls, with the body whorl the largest. The sutures are wavy. The shell is smooth or with about 12 smooth spiral ridges. The broad umbilicus is funnel-shaped. The nacreous aperture is oval with the long axis inclined to the left. It is also prosocline, i.e. with the growth lines leaning forward (adapically) with respect to the direction of the cone. The outer lip is thin. The sexes are separate but seldom differ externally. They are at the same time hermaphrodites but self-fertilization is prevented by anatomical mechanisms. The species is a suspension or deposit feeder.

== Distribution and habitat ==
This species occurs across the Northern Atlantic Ocean, Greenland, the western coast of Norway, rarely along the British coast, the Gulf of Maine to Massachusetts Bay. It can be found from near the seashore to the bathyal zone.
