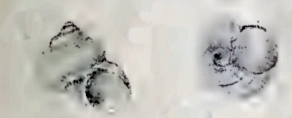
- Original drawing with two views of a shell of Margarites kophameli

Scientific classification
- Kingdom: Animalia
- Phylum: Mollusca
- Class: Gastropoda
- Subclass: Vetigastropoda
- Order: Trochida
- Family: Margaritidae
- Genus: Margarites
- Species: M. kophameli

Binomial name
- Margarites kophameli (Strebel, 1905)

Synonyms
- Margarita kophameli Strebel, 1905

= Margarites kophameli =

Species of gastropod

Margarites kophameli is a species of sea snail, a marine gastropod mollusk in the family Margaritidae.

== Description ==
The height of the shell is 7.5 mm, its diameter 8.8 mm. The five whorls of the yellowish-white, umbilicated shell increase rapidly in size. They are flattened at the suture and then moderately curved. Only the body whorl is more curved and slightly wrinkled at the base and the funnel-shaped umbilicus. The sculpture consists of very fine, sharp lines of growth. They are crossed by very fine, spiral threads, which are separated by approximately equal intervals.

== Distribution ==
This marine species occurs off Argentina.
