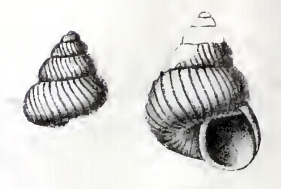
- Original drawing with two views of a shell of Margarites laminarum

Scientific classification
- Kingdom: Animalia
- Phylum: Mollusca
- Class: Gastropoda
- Subclass: Vetigastropoda
- Order: Trochida
- Family: Margaritidae
- Genus: Margarites
- Species: M. laminarum

Binomial name
- Margarites laminarum (Jeffreys, 1883)

Synonyms
- Solariella laminarum (Jeffreys, 1883); Trochus laminarum Jeffreys, 1883 (original description)

= Margarites laminarum =

Species of gastropod

Margarites laminarum is a species of sea snail, a marine gastropod mollusk in the family Margaritidae.

== Description ==
(Original description by Gwyn Jeffreys) The rather thin shell has a conical shape. It is semitransparent, and lustreless. Its sculpture shows numerous thin and delicate, but jagged and irregular curved laminae in the line of growth, which do not extend to the umbilicus. There are about 40 on the body whorl, some of them double. The interstices are quite smooth. The colour of the shell is light yellowish-brown. The spire is raised. The shell contains 6 whorls. These are convex and rounded. The body whorl is equal to about two fifths of the spire. The apex is twisted. The suture is distinct. The aperture is nearly circular. The outer lip is thin, but thicker and expanded at the base and partly folded over the umbilical perforation. The umbilicus is somewhat concave, with a small perforation.
