= Margarites toroides =

Scientific classification
- Kingdom: Animalia
- Phylum: Mollusca
- Class: Gastropoda
- Subclass: Vetigastropoda
- Order: Trochida
- Family: Margaritidae
- Genus: Margarites
- Species: M. toroides

Binomial name
- Margarites toroides Hoffman, van Heugten & Lavaleye, 2011

Species of gastropod

Margarites toroides is a species of sea snail, a marine gastropod mollusc in the family Margaritidae.
