= Antimargarita maoria =

Scientific classification
- Kingdom: Animalia
- Phylum: Mollusca
- Class: Gastropoda
- Subclass: Vetigastropoda
- Order: Trochida
- Family: Margaritidae
- Genus: Antimargarita
- Species: A. maoria

Binomial name
- Antimargarita maoria Dell, 1995

Species of gastropod

Antimargarita maoria is a species of sea snail, a marine gastropod mollusk in the family Margaritidae.

== Description ==
The height of the shell attains 12 mm, its diameter is 14 mm.

== Distribution ==
This marine species is endemic to the Antipodes Islands, New Zealand.
