= Antimargarita bentarti =

Scientific classification
- Kingdom: Animalia
- Phylum: Mollusca
- Class: Gastropoda
- Subclass: Vetigastropoda
- Order: Trochida
- Family: Margaritidae
- Genus: Antimargarita
- Species: A. bentarti

Binomial name
- Antimargarita bentarti Aldea, Zelaya & Troncoso, 2009

Species of gastropod

Antimargarita bentarti is a species of sea snail, a marine gastropod mollusk in the family Margaritidae.

== Distribution ==
This marine species occurs in Antarctic waters off the South Shetland Islands.
