= Margarites koreanicus =

Scientific classification
- Kingdom: Animalia
- Phylum: Mollusca
- Class: Gastropoda
- Subclass: Vetigastropoda
- Order: Trochida
- Family: Margaritidae
- Genus: Margarites
- Species: M. koreanicus

Binomial name
- Margarites koreanicus (Dall, 1919)

Synonyms
- Solariella koreanica Dall, 1919

Species of gastropod

Margarites koreanicus is a species of sea snail, a marine gastropod mollusk in the family Margaritidae.

== Description ==
(Original description by W.H. Dall) The height of the shell attains 7 mm. The small, white shell has with four well rounded whorls exclusive of the minute glassy nucleus, and a distinct not appressed suture. The spiral sculpture consists of a feeble thread at the base and two stronger, rather widely separated, sharper threads around the narrow umbilicus. The spiral sculpture also consists of (on the last whorl about 25) obliquely retractive low folds which barely reach the periphery, with narrower interspaces, but are feebly and irregularly revived on the base, especially near the umbilicus. The subcircular aperture is hardly interrupted by the body and has a sharp thin margin.

== Distribution ==
This species occurs in the Sea of Japan, off Korea.
