= Margarites avachensis =

Scientific classification
- Kingdom: Animalia
- Phylum: Mollusca
- Class: Gastropoda
- Subclass: Vetigastropoda
- Order: Trochida
- Family: Margaritidae
- Genus: Margarites
- Species: M. avachensis

Binomial name
- Margarites avachensis Galkin, 1955 [ex Bartsch MS]

Species of gastropod

Margarites avachensis is a species of sea snail, a marine gastropod mollusk in the family Margaritidae.

== Description ==
The shell attains a height of 15 mm.

== Distribution ==
This marine species occurs in the Northern Pacific Ocean.
