= Margarites scintillans =

- Drawing with an apertural view of a shell of Margarites scintillans

Scientific classification
- Kingdom: Animalia
- Phylum: Mollusca
- Class: Gastropoda
- Subclass: Vetigastropoda
- Order: Trochida
- Family: Margaritidae
- Genus: Margarites
- Species: M. scintillans

Binomial name
- Margarites scintillans (Watson, 1879)

Synonyms
- Margarita scintillans Watson, 1879; Trochus (Margarita?) scintillans Watson, 1879

Species of gastropod

Margarites scintillans is a species of sea snail, a marine gastropod mollusk in the family Margaritidae.

== Description ==
The height of the shell attains 5 mm. The small, thin, white shell has a very depressedly conoidal shape. It is angulated, and tumid on the base. It has a small umbilicus. The aperture is semioval. Its sculpture is perfectly smooth but for some curved puckerings which radiate from the umbilicus, but very soon die out. Above the middle the body whorl is roundly angulated. The color of the shell is pure white, with a transparent calcareous layer over brilliant fiery pearly nacre. The spire is very depressedly conical. The apex is bluntly rounded, with a minute hyaline, depressed embryonic tip. The 4 whorls are barely convex. The suture is slightly impressed. The aperture is semi oval. The thin outer lip is barely angulated at the periphery. The inner lip is straight, patulous, and right-angled at its junction with the base.

== Distribution ==
This marine species occurs off Bermuda and Puerto Rico at depths between 713 m and 1966 m.
