= Margarites hickmanae =

Hickman margarite

Scientific classification
- Kingdom: Animalia
- Phylum: Mollusca
- Class: Gastropoda
- Subclass: Vetigastropoda
- Order: Trochida
- Family: Margaritidae
- Genus: Margarites
- Species: M. hickmanae

Binomial name
- Margarites hickmanae J. H. McLean, 1984

Species of gastropod

Margarites hickmanae, common name the Hickman margarite, is a species of sea snail, a marine gastropod mollusk in the family Margaritidae.

== Description ==
The height of the shell attains 10 mm.

== Distribution ==
This marine species occurs off the Aleutians.
