= Margarites avenosooki =

Scientific classification
- Kingdom: Animalia
- Phylum: Mollusca
- Class: Gastropoda
- Subclass: Vetigastropoda
- Order: Trochida
- Family: Margaritidae
- Genus: Margarites
- Species: M. avenosooki

Binomial name
- Margarites avenosooki MacGinitie, 1959

Species of gastropod

Margarites avenosooki is a species of sea snail, a marine gastropod mollusk in the family Margaritidae.
