= Margarites miona =

Scientific classification
- Kingdom: Animalia
- Phylum: Mollusca
- Class: Gastropoda
- Subclass: Vetigastropoda
- Order: Trochida
- Family: Margaritidae
- Genus: Margarites
- Species: M. miona

Binomial name
- Margarites miona Dall, 1927

Synonyms
- Margarites (Lilularia) miona Dall, 1927

Species of gastropod

Margarites miona is a species of sea snail, a marine gastropod mollusk in the family Margaritidae.

== Description ==
The height of the shell attains 2 mm.

== Distribution ==
This species occurs in the Atlantic Ocean off Georgia, USA, at depths between 538 m and 805 m.
