= Margarites dnopherus =

Scientific classification
- Kingdom: Animalia
- Phylum: Mollusca
- Class: Gastropoda
- Subclass: Vetigastropoda
- Order: Trochida
- Family: Margaritidae
- Genus: Margarites
- Species: M. dnopherus

Binomial name
- Margarites dnopherus (Watson, 1879)

Synonyms
- Trochus (Margarita) dnopherus Watson, 1879

Species of gastropod

Margarites dnopherus is a species of sea snail, a marine gastropod mollusk in the family Margaritidae.

== Description ==
(Original description by R.B. Watson) The height of the shell attains 10 mm. The rather strong shell has a depressed-conical shape. It is semi-transparent and has a dark, pearly iridescence. There are five, strong spiral ridges above the base. The first is close to the suture and is exquisitely beaded from the middle of the second whorl. The beads are about 35 on the last and 22 on the penultimate whorl. The second ridge is remote from the first, and forms a shoulder to the whorls. The third, fourth and fifth occupy the periphery, which is carinated by the fourth till close up to the aperture, when the fifth forms the carina. Four fine threads, of which the first one is partially beaded, lie in the flat between the first and second ridge; two between the second and third; one between the third and fourth. Below the fifth ridge is a flat furrow narrower than the rest. Below the furrow is a sixth ridge, slighter than the others. The base of the shell is closely covered with 11 spiral threads, which tend to become stronger and wider apart near the umbilicus. The first three ridges alone appear on the upper whorls. Longitudinally the whole surface is sharply scored by the lines of growth.

The color of the shell is a ruddy brownish white, shot with a green and purple iridescence. The spire is depressedly scalar. The apex is bluntly mammillated by the somewhat shapeless, round, largish, glassy, ruddy embryonic whorl. The shell consists of 4½ whorls that increase rather rapidly. The suture is rather faint. The roundish aperture is oblique, being slightly peaked above and a little angulated on the columella. The outer lip is sharp but not thin and brilliantly iridescent within. The inner lip is very much thickened by a pearly pad, which is very thick below where it envelops what might have been otherwise a tooth on the point of the columella. The pad is thinner in the middle of the columella, and thickens again at the junction with the body whorl, where it thins out quickly. The lip here is very slightly reflected on the umbilicus. The umbilicus is very small and contracted, not so much by the reflection of the inner lip as by the columella being bent round to the right across it. The yellow, horny operculum is very thin with about 11 very faintly defined turns.

== Distribution ==
This species occurs in the Atlantic Ocean off Brazil at depths between 600 m and 640 m.
