= Margarites vahlii =

Scientific classification
- Kingdom: Animalia
- Phylum: Mollusca
- Class: Gastropoda
- Subclass: Vetigastropoda
- Order: Trochida
- Family: Margaritidae
- Genus: Margarites
- Species: M. vahlii

Binomial name
- Margarites vahlii (Møller, 1842)

Synonyms
- Margarita acuminata auct. non Sowerby, 1838; Margarita vahlii Möller, 1842; Margarites angulatus Galkin, 1955; Margarites hypolispus Dall, 1919; Margarites johnsoni Dall, W.H., 1921; Margarites mighelsi Rehder, H.A., 1937

Species of gastropod

Margarites vahlii, common name the Vahl margarite, is a species of sea snail, a marine gastropod mollusk in the family Margaritidae.

== Description ==
The height of the shell attains 1.2 mm, its diameter 1.8 mm. The small, solid shell has a turbinate shape. It is pale flesh color, polished, smooth. It has five well rounded whorls, including a minute subglobular nucleus. The suture is very distinct, not appressed. The base of the shell is rounded with a narrow deep perforate umbilicus. The simple aperture is subcircular. The inner lip is hardly thickened. The body is covered with a thin coat of enamel.

== Distribution ==
This marine species occurs off Greenland, Canada, in the Arctic Ocean north of Bering Strait, at depths between 4 m and 931 m.
