= Antimargarita =

Scientific classification
- Kingdom: Animalia
- Phylum: Mollusca
- Class: Gastropoda
- Subclass: Vetigastropoda
- Order: Trochida
- Family: Margaritidae
- Subfamily: Margaritinae
- Genus: Antimargarita; Powell, 1951

Type species
- Valvatella dulcis E.A. Smith, 1907

Genus of gastropods

Antimargarita is a genus of sea snails, marine gastropod mollusks in the family Margaritidae.

== Species ==
Species within the genus Antimargarita include:

- Antimargarita bentarti Aldea, Zelaya & Troncoso, 2009
- Antimargarita dulcis (E.A. Smith, 1907)
- Antimargarita maoria Dell, 1995
- Antimargarita powelli Aldea, Zelaya & Troncoso, 2009
- Antimargarita smithiana (Hedley, 1916)

Species brought into synonymy

- Antimargarita smithiana (Hedley, 1916): synonym of Submargarita smithiana Hedley, 1916
- Antimargarita thielei (Hedley, 1916): synonym of Falsimargarita thielei (Hedley, 1916)
