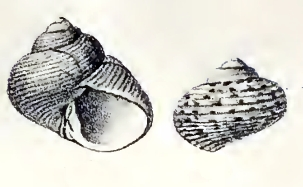
- Drawing with two views of a shell of Margarites schantaricus

Scientific classification
- Kingdom: Animalia
- Phylum: Mollusca
- Class: Gastropoda
- Subclass: Vetigastropoda
- Order: Trochida
- Family: Margaritidae
- Genus: Margarites
- Species: M. schantaricus

Binomial name
- Margarites schantaricus (Middendorff, 1849)

Synonyms
- Margarita modesta Middendorff, 1849; Margarita schantarica Middendorf, 1849; Margarites kamchaticus Dall, 1919; Margarites ochotensis (Philippi, 1851); Trochus modestus Middendorff, 1847 (preoccupied name); Trochus schantaricus Middendorff, 1849

= Margarites schantaricus =

Species of sea snail

Margarites schantaricus is a species of sea snail, a marine gastropod mollusk in the family Margaritidae.

== Description ==
The height of the shell attains 21 mm, its diameter 22 mm. The thin, perforate shell has a conoid-convex shape. Its apex is obtuse, thin. It is dark slate-gray, buff around the umbilicus, with spots of dull black below the periphery. The convex whorls are encircled by stride. The body whorl is large, scarcely angulated. The base of the shell is a little convex. The suture is distinct. The large aperture is suborbicular. The peristome is subcontinuous. The columella is subproduced at the base. The umbilicus is partly closed by the columellar lip. The line-like, elevated longitudinal striae of the sculpture are only weak, but are pretty sharply defined. They encircle the whorls at regular distances from each other, and are about one-fourth the width of their interstices. Sometimes there are still more delicate secondary threads between them. Of the first there are 10-12 on the penultimate whorl. Upon the base of the body whorl the ridges become broader and broader. In the vicinity of the umbilicus they exceed double the breadth of the intervening furrows. The layer which this sculpture principally composes, is for the rest only about the thickness of a coat of varnish. And beneath it, it is showing very slight traces of longitudinal striae, appears silvery mother-of-pearl, which shines on the whorls of many specimens while still living. The most usual color is a dark slate-gray, through which the pearly layer, as through a heavy gauze, faintly shines. But if one still closer follows the color changes, we find upon the pearly layer a thick yellow one, visible also from outside on the base, for it extends over the whole umbilical tract as far as the inner lip. Usually this yellow tract merges into the ground color around its circumference. More seldom it is sharply defined. In some specimens this yellow color predominates over the whole shell. But usually it is covered by the slate color, which on the base through separated flames passes into the above-described yellow umbilical spot.

== Distribution ==
This marine species occurs in the Sea of Okhotsk.
