= Omphalomargarites =

Scientific classification
- Kingdom: Animalia
- Phylum: Mollusca
- Class: Gastropoda
- Subclass: Vetigastropoda
- Order: Trochida
- Superfamily: Trochoidea
- Family: Trochidae
- Genus: Omphalomargarites; Habe & Ito, 1965

Genus of gastropods

Omphalomargarites is a genus of sea snails, marine gastropod mollusks in the family Trochidae, the top snails.

== Species ==
Species within the genus Omphalomargarites include:

- Omphalomargarites sagamiensis Kuroda & Habe, 1971

Species brought into synonymy

- Omphalomargarites vorticifera (Dall, 1873): synonym of Margarites vorticiferus (Dall, 1873)
