= Anomphalogaza =

Scientific classification
- Kingdom: Animalia
- Phylum: Mollusca
- Class: Gastropoda
- Subclass: Vetigastropoda
- Order: Trochida
- Superfamily: Trochoidea
- Family: Margaritidae
- Genus: Anomphalogaza; Hickman, 2012

Genus of gastropods

Anomphalogaza is a genus of sea snails, marine gastropod mollusks in the family Margaritidae within the superfamily Trochoidea, the top snails, turban snails and their allies.

== Species ==
Species within the genus Anomphalogaza include:

- Anomphalogaza moluccensis Hickman, 2012
