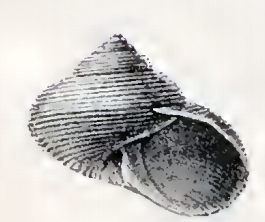
- Original drawing with an apertural view of a shell of Falsimargarita iris

Scientific classification
- Kingdom: Animalia
- Phylum: Mollusca
- Class: Gastropoda
- Subclass: Vetigastropoda
- Order: Trochida
- Superfamily: Trochoidea
- Family: Calliostomatidae
- Genus: Falsimargarita
- Species: F. iris

Binomial name
- Falsimargarita iris (E.A. Smith, 1915)

Synonyms
- Margarites iris E. A. Smith, 1915

= Falsimargarita iris =

Species of sea snail

Falsimargarita iris is a species of sea snail, a marine gastropod mollusk in the family Calliostomatidae.

== Description ==
The height of the shell attains 20 mm. The thin, whitish, opalescent shell has a depressed turbinate shape. It is narrowly umbilicate. It contains 5 whorls. The apical whorls is smooth, glossy, rounded and opaque white. The other whorls are rather convex. They are ornamented with spiral thread-like cords, four on the second whorl. about six or seven on the next, eight or nine on the penultimate whorl, and about forty on the body whorl. The threads vary in thickness, some being very much more slender than the others. The body whorl is obtusely subangled at the periphery. In the umbilical region it is opaque white and smooth except for some growth lines. The whole surface of the shell exhibits curved lines of growth, but they are not strong enough to make the spiral lirae distinctly granose. The large aperture is subcircular and pearly within. The outer lip is thin. The white columella is obliquely arcuate, thickened, reflexed, and appressed to the umbilical region. This last characteristic is a peculiar feature.

== Distribution ==
This marine species occurs in the Atlantic Ocean off Argentina and the Falkland Islands at depths between 10 m and 461 m.
