= Falsimargarita atlantoides =

Scientific classification
- Kingdom: Animalia
- Phylum: Mollusca
- Class: Gastropoda
- Subclass: Vetigastropoda
- Order: Trochida
- Superfamily: Trochoidea
- Family: Calliostomatidae
- Genus: Falsimargarita
- Species: F. atlantoides

Binomial name
- Falsimargarita atlantoides (Quinn, 1992)

Synonyms
- Calliostoma atlantoides Quinn, 1992; Margarites atlantoides (Quinn, 1992)

Species of gastropod

Falsimargarita atlantoides is a species of sea snail, a marine gastropod mollusk, in the family Calliostomatidae within the superfamily Trochoidea, the top snails, turban snails and their allies.
