= Falsimargarita parvispira =

Scientific classification
- Kingdom: Animalia
- Phylum: Mollusca
- Class: Gastropoda
- Subclass: Vetigastropoda
- Order: Trochida
- Superfamily: Trochoidea
- Family: Calliostomatidae
- Genus: Falsimargarita
- Species: †F. parvispira

Binomial name
- †Falsimargarita parvispira Quilty, Darragh, Gallagher & Harding, 2016

Extinct species of gastropod

Falsimargarita parvispira is an extinct species of sea snail, a marine gastropod mollusk, in the family Calliostomatidae within the superfamily Trochoidea, the top snails, turban snails and their allies.

== Distribution ==
This species occurs in Antarctica.
