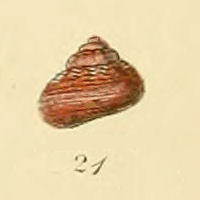

Scientific classification
- Kingdom: Animalia
- Phylum: Mollusca
- Class: Gastropoda
- Subclass: Vetigastropoda
- Order: Trochida
- Family: Margaritidae
- Genus: Margarites
- Species: M. striatus

Binomial name
- Margarites striatus (Leach, 1841)

Synonyms
- Eumargarita groenlandicus auct. non Gmelin, 1791; Margarita carneus (Lowe, 1826); Margarita cinerarius auct. non Linnaeus, 1758; Margarita cinerea auct. non Couthouy, 1838; Margarita despecta Mörch, 1857; Margarita elatior Middendorff, 1849; Margarita incarnatus (Couthouy, 1838); Margarita intermedia Leche, 1878; Margarita laevigata Leche, 1878; Margarita normalis Middendorff, 1849; Margarita rudis Leche, 1878; Margarita striata Leach, 1819; Margarita trochiformis Möller, 1842; Margarita undulata Sowerby, G.B. I, 1838; Margarites shannonicus Dall, 1919; Margarites striatus var. laevior (Jeffreys, 1865); Margarites undulatus (Sowerby I, 1838); Trochus albidus Jeffreys, 1865; Trochus cinerarius auct. non Linnaeus, 1758; Trochus dilatatus Jeffreys, 1865; Trochus fabricii Philippi, 1852; Trochus groenlandicus auct. non Gmelin, 1791; Trochus leachii Philippi, 1852; Trochus laevior Jeffreys, 1865; Trochus margarita auct. non Montagu, 1808; Trochus undulatus (Sowerby I, 1838); Turbo carneus Lowe, 1826; Turbo incarnatus Couthouy, 1838; Turbo undulatus (Sowerby I, 1838)

= Margarites striatus =

Species of gastropod

Margarites striatus, common name the striate margarite, is a species of sea snail, a marine gastropod mollusk in the family Margaritidae.

== Description ==
The size of the shell varies between 13 mm and 19 mm.

== Distribution ==
This species occurs in European waters and in the Northwest Atlantic Ocean; in the Arctic Pacific Ocean at depths between 0 m and 22 m.
