= Falsimargarita stephaniae =

Scientific classification
- Kingdom: Animalia
- Phylum: Mollusca
- Class: Gastropoda
- Subclass: Vetigastropoda
- Order: Trochida
- Family: Calliostomatidae
- Genus: Falsimargarita
- Species: F. stephaniae

Binomial name
- Falsimargarita stephaniae Rios & Simone, 2005

Species of sea snail

Falsimargarita stephaniae is a species of sea snail, a marine gastropod mollusk in the family Calliostomatidae.

== Distribution ==
This species occurs in the Atlantic Ocean off the Falkland Islands at a depth of 1200 m.
