= Antimargarita dulcis =

Scientific classification
- Kingdom: Animalia
- Phylum: Mollusca
- Class: Gastropoda
- Subclass: Vetigastropoda
- Order: Trochida
- Family: Margaritidae
- Genus: Antimargarita
- Species: A. dulcis

Binomial name
- Antimargarita dulcis (E.A. Smith, 1907)

Synonyms
- Margarites dulcis E. A. Smith, 1907; Minolia dulcis E. A. Smith, 1907; Valvatella dulcis E.A. Smith, 1907 (original description)

Species of gastropod

Antimargarita dulcis is a species of sea snail, a marine gastropod mollusk in the family Margaritidae.

== Description ==
The shell size varies between 9 mm and 15 mm. The shell is turbinate, narrowly but deeply umbilicated, and exhibits an iridescent blue color often obscured by whitish, thread–like lines of growth and spiral line. The shell typically has between 5 and 5.5 whorls, with the first few whorls being yellowish. The shell's outer surface displays more conspicuous lines of growth between the ridges, giving it a distinctive texture and appearance.

== Distribution ==
This species occurs in Antarctic waters off the South Shetland Islands, the Antarctic Peninsula, the Weddell Sea and the Ross Sea. This species inhabits deep waters, with the type locality reported at a depth of 130 fathoms.
