= Margarites giganteus =

Scientific classification
- Kingdom: Animalia
- Phylum: Mollusca
- Class: Gastropoda
- Subclass: Vetigastropoda
- Order: Trochida
- Family: Margaritidae
- Genus: Margarites
- Species: M. giganteus

Binomial name
- Margarites giganteus (Leche, 1878)

Synonyms
- Margarites argentatus var. gigantea Leche, 1878 (original combination); Margarites olivaceus olivaceus f. giganteus (Leche, W., 1878)

Species of gastropod

Margarites giganteus, common name the giant margarite, is a species of sea snail, a marine gastropod mollusk in the family Margaritidae.

== Description ==
The height of the shell attains 6 mm.

== Distribution ==
This marine species occurs off Novaya Zemlya, Russia.
