= Falsimargarita imperialis =

Scientific classification
- Kingdom: Animalia
- Phylum: Mollusca
- Class: Gastropoda
- Subclass: Vetigastropoda
- Order: Trochida
- Superfamily: Trochoidea
- Family: Calliostomatidae
- Genus: Falsimargarita
- Species: F. imperialis

Binomial name
- Falsimargarita imperialis (Simone & Birman, 2006)

Synonyms
- Margarites imperialis Simone & Birman, 2006

Species of gastropod

Falsimargarita imperialis is a species of sea snail, a marine gastropod mollusk, in the family Calliostomatidae within the superfamily Trochoidea, the top snails, turban snails and their allies.
