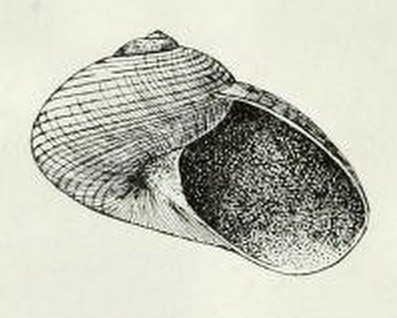
- Drawing with an apertural view of a shell of Margarites albolineatus

Scientific classification
- Kingdom: Animalia
- Phylum: Mollusca
- Class: Gastropoda
- Subclass: Vetigastropoda
- Order: Trochida
- Family: Margaritidae
- Genus: Margarites
- Species: M. albolineatus

Binomial name
- Margarites albolineatus (E. A. Smith, 1899)

Synonyms
- Valvatella albolineata E. A. Smith, 1899

= Margarites albolineatus =

Species of gastropod

Margarites albolineatus is a species of sea snail, a marine gastropod mollusk in the family Margaritidae, the turban snails.

== Description ==
The height of the shell attains 4.5 mm, its diameter 8 mm. The imperforate shell has a depressed, suborbicular shape. The short spire consists of 5 convex whorls, that increase rapidly in size. It contains many white, filiform spiral threads. There is a large, round aperture, that is iridescent inside.

== Distribution ==
This marine species occurs off the coast of the Bering Sea.
