= Cantharidoscops =

Scientific classification
- Kingdom: Animalia
- Phylum: Mollusca
- Class: Gastropoda
- Subclass: Vetigastropoda
- Order: Trochida
- Superfamily: Trochoidea
- Family: Trochidae
- Genus: Cantharidoscops; Galkin, 1955

Genus of gastropods

Cantharidoscops is a genus of sea snails, marine gastropod mollusks in the family Trochidae, the top snails.

== Species ==
Species within the genus Cantharidoscops include:

- Cantharidoscops clausus (Golikov & Gulbin, 1978)
- Cantharidoscops frigidus (Dall, 1919)
