= Falsimargarita georgiana =

Scientific classification
- Kingdom: Animalia
- Phylum: Mollusca
- Class: Gastropoda
- Subclass: Vetigastropoda
- Order: Trochida
- Family: Calliostomatidae
- Genus: Falsimargarita
- Species: F. georgiana

Binomial name
- Falsimargarita georgiana Dell, 1990

Species of sea snail

Falsimargarita georgiana is a species of sea snail, a marine gastropod mollusk in the family Calliostomatidae.

== Description ==
The size of the shell varies between 20 mm and 31 mm. It has a rounded whorl profile and a uniform spiral sculpture.

== Distribution ==
This marine species occurs off the South Georgia Islands at depths between 2718 m and 2818 m.
