= Falsimargarita challengerica =

Scientific classification
- Kingdom: Animalia
- Phylum: Mollusca
- Class: Gastropoda
- Subclass: Vetigastropoda
- Order: Trochida
- Superfamily: Trochoidea
- Family: Calliostomatidae
- Genus: Falsimargarita
- Species: F. challengerica

Binomial name
- Falsimargarita challengerica B. A. Marshall, 2016

Species of gastropod

Falsimargarita challengerica is a species of sea snail, a marine gastropod mollusk, in the family Calliostomatidae within the superfamily Trochoidea, the top snails, turban snails and their allies.

== Distribution ==
This species occurs in New Zealand Exclusive Economic Zone.
