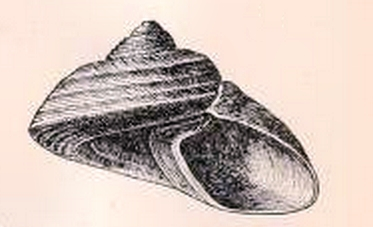
- Drawing with an apertural view of a shell of Margarites vorticiferus

Scientific classification
- Kingdom: Animalia
- Phylum: Mollusca
- Class: Gastropoda
- Subclass: Vetigastropoda
- Order: Trochida
- Family: Margaritidae
- Genus: Margarites
- Species: M. vorticiferus

Binomial name
- Margarites vorticiferus (Dall, 1873)

Synonyms
- Margarita vorticifera Dall, 1873; Margarites vorticifer (Dall, 1873); Margarites (Omphalomargarites) vorticiferus (Dall, 1873)

= Margarites vorticiferus =

Vortex margarite

Species of gastropod

Margarites vorticiferus, common name the vortex margarite, is a species of sea snail, a marine gastropod mollusk in the family Margaritidae.

== Description ==
The length of the salmon pink shell varies between 8 mm and 22 mm.

== Distribution ==
Pacific Ocean.

This marine species occurs in Asian arctic waters and from Alaska to Southern California, USA; Common intertidally and subtidally to at least 15 metres depth on coralline encrusted rocks, throughout the Aleutian Islands chain.
