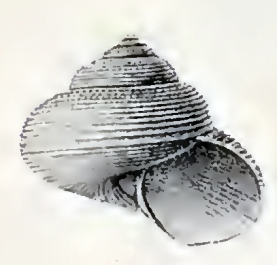
- Drawing with an apertural view of Falsimargarita gemma

Scientific classification
- Kingdom: Animalia
- Phylum: Mollusca
- Class: Gastropoda
- Subclass: Vetigastropoda
- Order: Trochida
- Superfamily: Trochoidea
- Family: Calliostomatidae
- Genus: Falsimargarita; Powell, 1951

Type species
- Margarites gemma E.A. Smith, 1915

= Falsimargarita =

Genus of sea snails

Falsimargarita is a genus of sea snails, marine gastropod mollusks in the family Calliostomatidae.

== Description ==
This genus differs from the other genera in the family Calliostomatidae by several characteristics: the conspicuous spiral whorls, obvious sculpture, an open umbilicus, a thin shell and external iridescence.

== Distribution ==
The species of this cold-water genus occurs in Antarctic waters and off the Magellanic Region of South America.

== Species ==
Species within the genus Falsimargarita include:

- Falsimargarita atlantoides (Quinn, 1992)
- Falsimargarita benthicola Dell, 1990
- Falsimargarita callista B. A. Marshall, 2016
- Falsimargarita challengerica B. A. Marshall, 2016
- Falsimargarita coriolis B. A. Marshall, 2016
- Falsimargarita coronata (Quinn, 1992)
- Falsimargarita eximia B. A. Marshall, 2016
- Falsimargarita gemma (E.A. Smith, 1915)
- Falsimargarita georgiana Dell, 1990
- Falsimargarita glaucophaos (Barnard, 1963)
- Falsimargarita imperialis (Simone & Birman, 2006)
- Falsimargarita iris (E.A. Smith, 1915)
- Falsimargarita kapala B. A. Marshall, 2016
- Falsimargarita nauduri Warén & Bouchet, 2001
- †Falsimargarita parvispira Quilty, Darragh, Gallagher & Harding, 2016
- Falsimargarita renkeri Engl, 2020
- Falsimargarita stephaniae Rios & Simone, 2005
- Falsimargarita tangaroa B. A. Marshall, 2016
- Falsimargarita terespira Simone, 2008
- Falsimargarita thielei (Hedley, 1916)
