= Falsimargarita glaucophaos =

Scientific classification
- Kingdom: Animalia
- Phylum: Mollusca
- Class: Gastropoda
- Subclass: Vetigastropoda
- Order: Trochida
- Superfamily: Trochoidea
- Family: Calliostomatidae
- Genus: Falsimargarita
- Species: F. glaucophaos

Binomial name
- Falsimargarita glaucophaos (Barnard, 1963)

Synonyms
- Calliostoma glaucophaos Barnard, 1963; Minolia glaucophaos (Barnard, 1963)

Species of gastropod

Falsimargarita glaucophaos is a species of sea snail, a marine gastropod mollusk, in the family Calliostomatidae within the superfamily Trochoidea, the top snails, turban snails and their allies.

== Description ==
The size of the shell varies between 6 mm and 15 mm. The shell contains, besides the smooth protoconch, 3½ rounded whorls.

== Distribution ==
This species occurs in South Africa (country).
