= Falsimargarita benthicola =

Scientific classification
- Kingdom: Animalia
- Phylum: Mollusca
- Class: Gastropoda
- Subclass: Vetigastropoda
- Order: Trochida
- Family: Calliostomatidae
- Genus: Falsimargarita
- Species: F. benthicola

Binomial name
- Falsimargarita benthicola Dell, 1990

Species of sea snail

Falsimargarita benthicola is a species of sea snail, a marine gastropod mollusk in the family Calliostomatidae.

== Description ==
The height of the shell attains 21 mm.

== Distribution ==
This marine species occurs off the Drake Passage, Antarctica, at depths between 3,010 m and 3,510 m.
