= Margarites costalis =

Scientific classification
- Kingdom: Animalia
- Phylum: Mollusca
- Class: Gastropoda
- Subclass: Vetigastropoda
- Order: Trochida
- Family: Margaritidae
- Genus: Margarites
- Species: M. costalis

Binomial name
- Margarites costalis (Gould, 1841)

Synonyms
- Margarita elatior Middendorff, 1849; Margarita genuina Middendorff, 1849; Margarita grandis Mörch, 1857; Margarita groenlandica Möller, H.P.C., 1842; Margarita major Dautzenberg & Fischer, 1912; Margarita striata Broderip & Sowerby, 1829; Margarites cinereus Filatova, Z.A. & B.I. Zatsepin, 1948; Margarites costalis costalis (Gould, 1841); Margarites (Pupillaria) rudis Dall, 1919; Margarites striata striata Galkin, Y.I., 1955; Margarites (Costomargarites) costalis (Gould, 1841); Trochus corneus Kiener, 1848; Trochus costalis Gould, 1841 (original combination); Trochus polaris Philippi, 1850; Turbo cinereus Couthouy, 1838

Species of gastropod

Margarites costalis, common name the boreal rosy margarite or the northern ridged margarite, is a species of sea snail, a marine gastropod mollusk in the family Margaritidae.

Subspecies

- Margarites costalis baxteri J. H. McLean, 1995
- Margarites costalis costalis (Gould, 1841)

== Description ==
The size of the shell varies between 5 mm and 25 mm. It is a conical, grayish (sometimes with rose or creamy tint), deeply umbilicate shell with five evenly rounded whorls. The sculpture shows strong, distant, spiral ridges, crossed by 10 to 12 fine, raised axial threads. The thin, finely crenulate outer lip is sharp. The pearly rose aperture is round.

(Original description by W.H. Dall of the synonym Margarites (Pupillaria) rudis) The shell is of moderate size. It is white with a pale olivaceous periostracum. The smooth nucleus consists of about one whorl and five subsequent whorls. The spiral sculpture consists of two strong cords with wider interspaces and a thud on which the suture is laid and which forms the margin of the base. There is also a small thread between the suture and the posterior cord and on the body whorl a similar thread in the interspaces. On the base there are six or seven smaller closer cords separated by obscurely channeled interspaces between the verge of a narrow umbilicus and the basal margin. The axial sculpture consists of (on the penultimate whorl about 20) retractive riblets extending from suture to periphery, with wider interspaces, slightly nodulous at the intersections with the spiral cords. There are also close obvious incremental regular lines over the whole surface. The simple, rounded aperture is quadrate. There is a glaze on the body. The inner lip is slightly thickened. The operculum is multispiral.

== Distribution ==
This marine species occurs in circum-arctic waters; from Labrador, Canada and Greenland to Cape Cod, USA; from the Bering Strait to Southern Alaska
