= Omphalomargarites sagamiensis =

Scientific classification
- Kingdom: Animalia
- Phylum: Mollusca
- Class: Gastropoda
- Subclass: Vetigastropoda
- Order: Trochida
- Superfamily: Trochoidea
- Family: Trochidae
- Genus: Omphalomargarites
- Species: O. sagamiensis

Binomial name
- Omphalomargarites sagamiensis Kuroda & Habe, 1971

Species of gastropod

Omphalomargarites sagamiensis is a species of sea snail, a marine gastropod mollusk in the family Trochidae, the top snails (not assigned to a subfamily).
