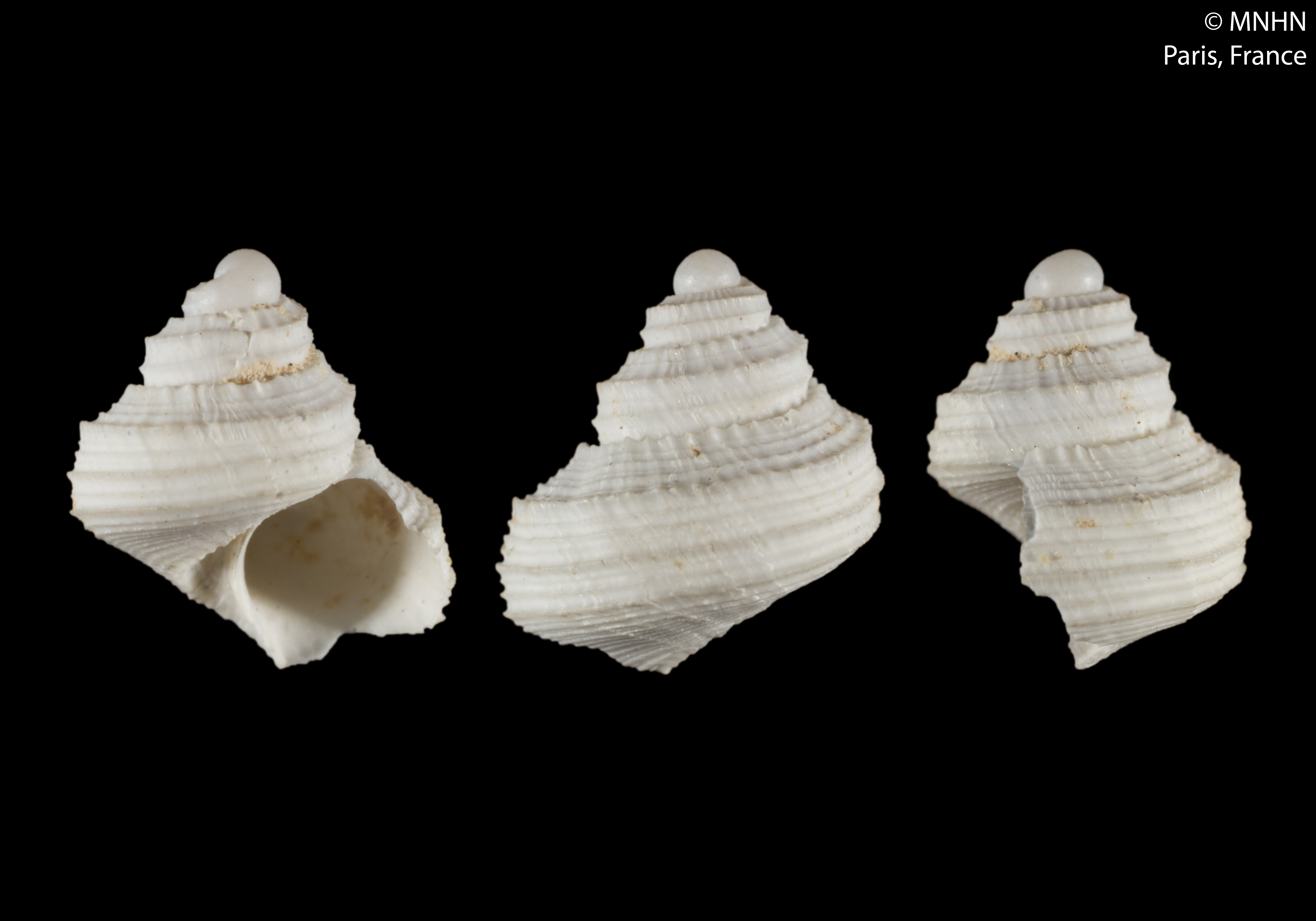
- Shell of Falsimargarita coriolis (holotype at MNHN, Paris)

Scientific classification
- Kingdom: Animalia
- Phylum: Mollusca
- Class: Gastropoda
- Subclass: Vetigastropoda
- Order: Trochida
- Superfamily: Trochoidea
- Family: Calliostomatidae
- Genus: Falsimargarita
- Species: F. coriolis

Binomial name
- Falsimargarita coriolis B. A. Marshall, 2016

= Falsimargarita coriolis =

Species of gastropod

Falsimargarita coriolis is a species of sea snail, a marine gastropod mollusk, in the family Calliostomatidae within the superfamily Trochoidea, the top snails, turban snails and their allies.

== Description ==
The length of the shell attains 5.8 mm.

== Distribution ==
This species occurs in New Caledonian Exclusive Economic Zone.
