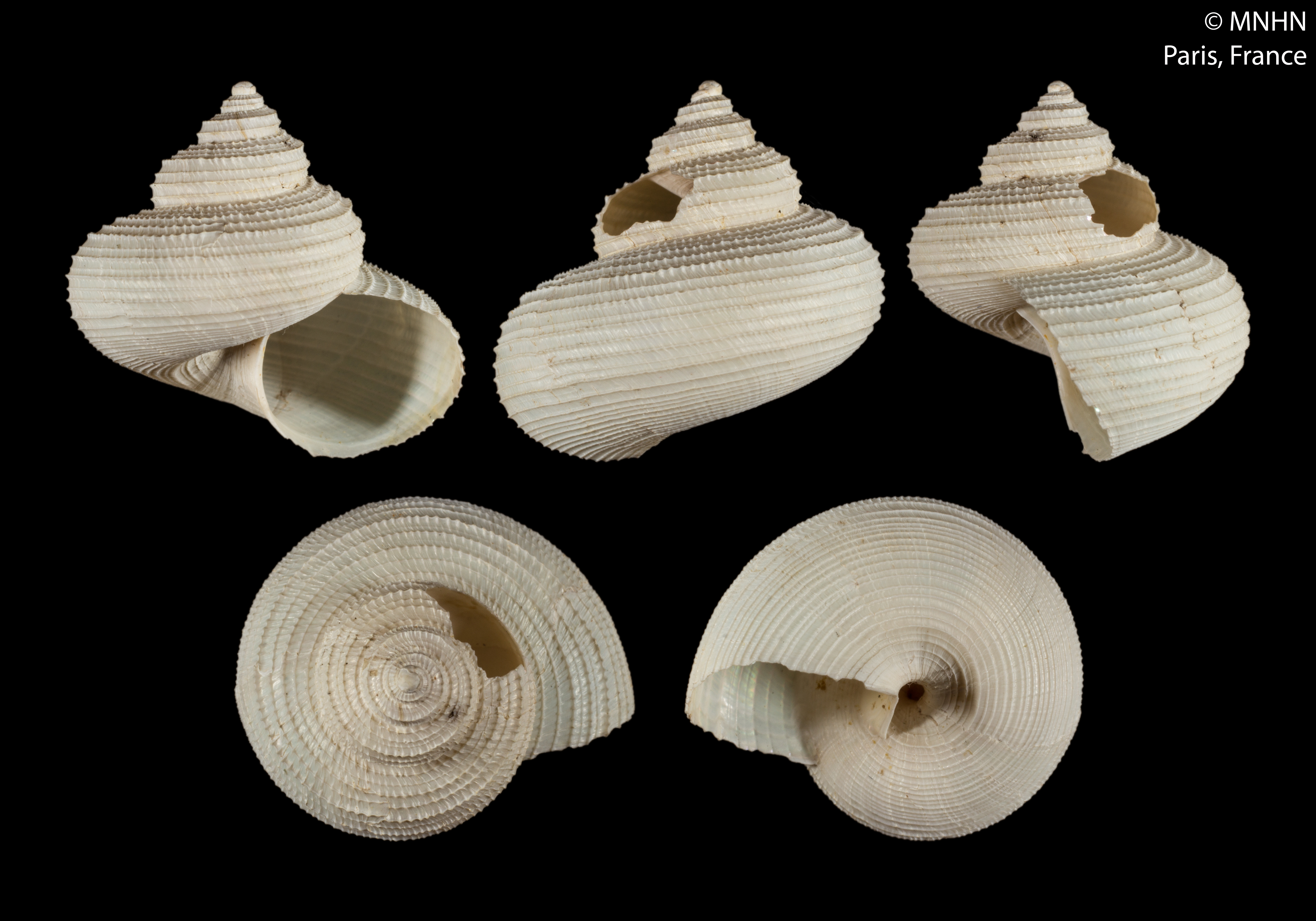
- Shell of Falsimargarita nauduri (holotype at MNHN, Paris)

Conservation status
- Vulnerable (IUCN 3.1)

Scientific classification
- Kingdom: Animalia
- Phylum: Mollusca
- Class: Gastropoda
- Subclass: Vetigastropoda
- Order: Trochida
- Family: Calliostomatidae
- Genus: Falsimargarita
- Species: F. nauduri

Binomial name
- Falsimargarita nauduri Warén & Bouchet, 2001

= Falsimargarita nauduri =

Species of sea snail

Falsimargarita nauduri is a species of sea snail, a marine gastropod mollusk in the family Calliostomatidae.

== Description ==
The length of the shell attains 18.7 mm.
