= Falsimargarita terespira =

Scientific classification
- Kingdom: Animalia
- Phylum: Mollusca
- Class: Gastropoda
- Subclass: Vetigastropoda
- Order: Trochida
- Family: Calliostomatidae
- Genus: Falsimargarita
- Species: F. terespira

Binomial name
- Falsimargarita terespira Simone, 2008

Species of sea snail

Falsimargarita terespira is a species of sea snail, a marine gastropod mollusc in the family Calliostomatidae.

== Description ==
The length of the shell attains 14 mm.

== Distribution ==
This species occurs in the Atlantic Ocean off Southern Brazil.
