= Cantharidoscops frigidus =

Scientific classification
- Kingdom: Animalia
- Phylum: Mollusca
- Class: Gastropoda
- Subclass: Vetigastropoda
- Order: Trochida
- Superfamily: Trochoidea
- Family: Trochidae
- Genus: Cantharidoscops
- Species: C. frigidus

Binomial name
- Cantharidoscops frigidus (Dall, 1919)

Synonyms
- Margarites frigidus Dall, 1919

Species of gastropod

Cantharidoscops frigidus, the polar margarite, is a species of sea snail, a marine gastropod mollusk in the family Trochidae, the top snails.

== Description ==
The length of the shell varies between 6 and 10 mm. The small, polished shell has a conic shape with pale flesh color. It consists of six whorls, including a minute subglobular nucleus. The suture is distinct but not appressed. The whorls are only moderately rounded. The axial sculpture shows faint incremental lines. The spiral sculpture has a few very faint lines near the umbilical region. The base of the shell is rounded and imperforate. The operculum is pale brown with about eight turns. The aperture is rounded and slightly angular above. The outer lip simple and sharp. The body shows a thin nacreous glaze. The columellar lip is rounded and broader than the rest.

The height of the shell attains 9 mm. The small, conic shell is polished. It has a pale flesh color. It contains six whorls, including a minute subglobular nucleus. The suture is distinct, not appressed. The whorls are only moderately rounded. The axial sculpture consists of faint incremental lines. The spiral sculpture consists of a few very faint lines near the umbilical region. The rounded base is imperforate. The operculum is pale brown with about eight turns. The rounded aperture is slightly angular above. The outer lip is simple and sharp. The body has a thin nacreous glaze. The columellar lip is rounded, and broader than the rest.

== Distribution ==
This species occurs in the Pacific near the Arctic Ocean and off northern Japan; and from Alaska's Admiralty Islands, to Nunivak Island in the Bering Sea.

== Habitat ==
This species is found in brackish and marine habitats:
