= Okinawa Trough =

Back-arc basin behind the Ryukyu arc-trench system in the West Pacific

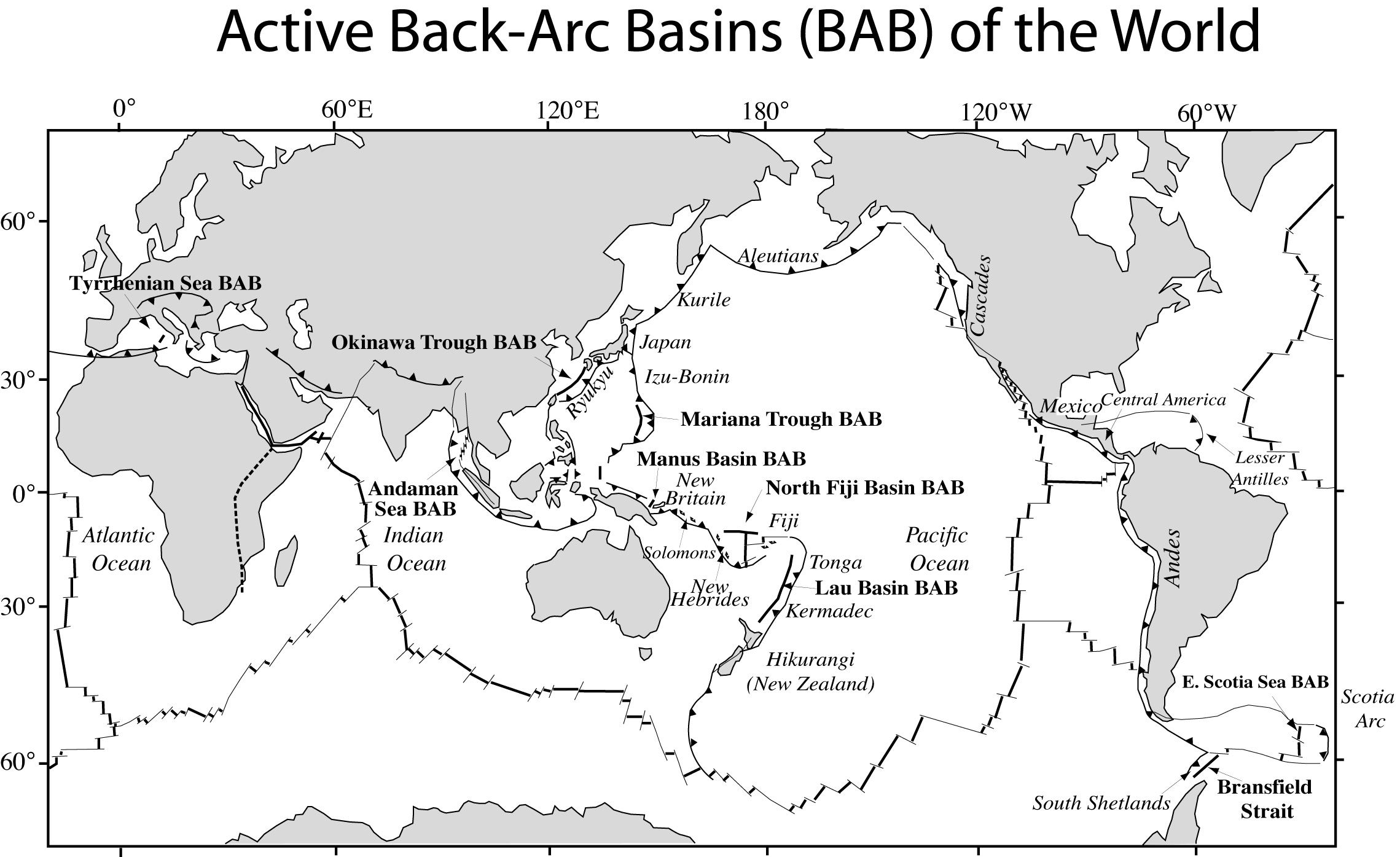
The Okinawa Trough in context of back-arc basins of the world

The Okinawa Trough (沖縄トラフ, Okinawa Torafu) (also called Chinese: 中琉界沟, literally "China-Ryukyu Border Trough") is a seabed feature of the East China Sea. It is an active, initial back-arc rifting basin which has formed behind the Ryukyu arc-trench system in the West Pacific. It developed where the Philippine Sea Plate is subducting under the Eurasia Plate.

== Description ==
It is a back-arc basin formed by extension within the continental lithosphere behind the far deeper Ryukyu Trench-arc system. The thickness of the crust in the northern Okinawa Trough is 30 km, thinning to 10 km in the southern Okinawa Trough. It has a large section more than 1,000 metres (3,300 ft) deep and a maximum depth of 2,716 metres (8,911 ft).

The Okinawa Trough still in an early stage of evolving from arc type to back-arc activity, and features volcanoes such as the Yonaguni Knoll IV.

== Implications for the China–Japan maritime boundary ==
=== Interpretations ===
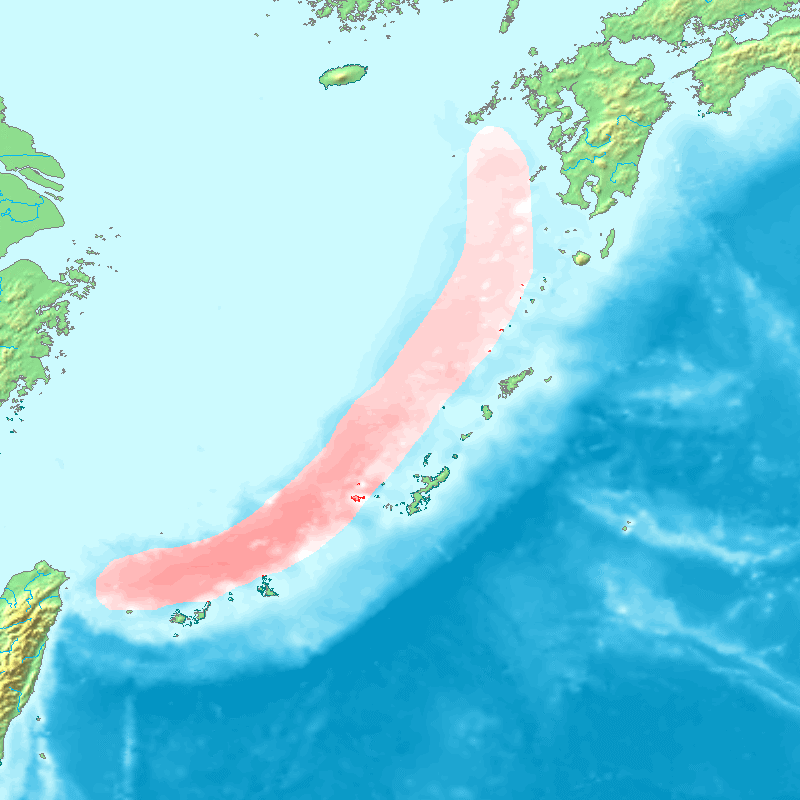
Okinawa trough

The existence of the Okinawa Trough complicates descriptive issues in the East China Sea. According to Professor Ji Guoxing of the Asia-Pacific Department at Shanghai Institute for International Studies,

- China's interpretation of the geography is that
  "...the Okinawa Trough proves that the continental shelves of China and Japan are not connected, that the Trough serves as the boundary between them, and that the Trough should not be ignored ...."
- Japan's interpretation of the geography is that
  "...the trough is just an incidental depression in a continuous continental margin between the two countries ... and that any legal effect of the trough should be ignored ...."

=== Legal procedure ===
On August 15, 2013, China's mission did a presentation to the Commission on the Limits of the Continental Shelf (CLCS) established under the United Nations Convention on the Law of the Sea (UNCLOS). The presentation was on the proposal that demarcates the limits of the outer continental shelf beyond 200 nm in part of the East China Sea. China states that China's continental shelf in the East China Sea extends to China-Ryukyu Border Trough naturally, which has been over 200 nautical miles away from the mainland baseline of Chinese territorial waters. According to UNCLOS, any country claiming continental shelves beyond 200 nm shall provide relevant scientific evidence to CLCS. To collect solid data, China deployed 14 scientific survey ships, covering an area of 250,000 square kilometers.
