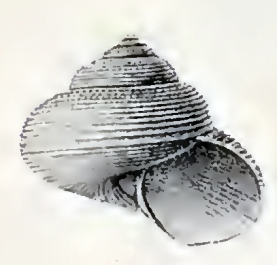
- Original drawing with an apertural view of a shell of Falsimargarita gemma

Scientific classification
- Kingdom: Animalia
- Phylum: Mollusca
- Class: Gastropoda
- Subclass: Vetigastropoda
- Order: Trochida
- Family: Calliostomatidae
- Genus: Falsimargarita
- Species: F. gemma

Binomial name
- Falsimargarita gemma (E.A. Smith, 1915)

Synonyms
- Margarites gemma E. A. Smith, 1915 (original combination)

= Falsimargarita gemma =

Species of sea snail

Falsimargarita gemma is a species of sea snail, a marine gastropod mollusk in the family Calliostomatidae.

== Description ==
(Original description by Edgar E. Smith) The size of the shell varies between 12 mm and 25 mm. The thin, turbinate, greenish-iridescent shell is moderately umbilicated. It is finely spirally lirate throughout. The threads upon the base below the periphery are finer than those above. The shell is sculptured also with fine arcuate lines of growth, which are coarser towards the suture, giving a somewhat cancellated appearance to the shell at this part. They cross the four or five spirals below the narrowly channeled suture, producing minute sharp points or nodules upon them. The shell contains 5½ whorls. The globose nucleus is white, smooth and porcellanous. The next whorl contains four spirals; the third has seven, not all equal in thickness. The penultimate whorls has eleven spirals and the body whorl has about fourteen above the periphery and about twenty-five below. The umbilical area is smooth and dirty white. The thin peristome is subcircular, and interrupted on its junction with the whorl. The columellar margin is slightly thickened and expanded upon the whorl and very narrowly reflexed. The iridescent aperture is finely sulcate. the grooves corresponding to the external lirae.

== Distribution ==
This marine species occurs off Antarctica, the Weddell Sea and the South Shetland Islands at depths between 165 m and 311 m.
