= Falsimargarita thielei =

Scientific classification
- Kingdom: Animalia
- Phylum: Mollusca
- Class: Gastropoda
- Subclass: Vetigastropoda
- Order: Trochida
- Family: Calliostomatidae
- Genus: Falsimargarita
- Species: F. thielei

Binomial name
- Falsimargarita thielei (Hedley, 1916)

Synonyms
- Antimargarita thielei (Hedley, 1916); Minolia thielei Hedley, 1916 (original combination)

Species of sea snail

Falsimargarita thielei is a species of sea snail, a marine gastropod mollusk in the family Calliostomatidae.

== Description ==
The size of the shell varies between 8 mm and 22 mm.

== Distribution ==
This marine species occurs off the South Shetland Islands and the South Orkney Islands at depths between 300 m and 400 m.
