= Cantharidoscops clausus =

Scientific classification
- Kingdom: Animalia
- Phylum: Mollusca
- Class: Gastropoda
- Subclass: Vetigastropoda
- Order: Trochida
- Superfamily: Trochoidea
- Family: Trochidae
- Genus: Cantharidoscops
- Species: C. clausus

Binomial name
- Cantharidoscops clausus (Golikov & Gulbin, 1978)

Species of gastropod

Cantharidoscops clausus is a species of sea snail, a marine gastropod mollusk in the family Trochidae, the top snails.

== Description ==
The shell grows to a length of 35 mm.

== Distribution ==
This marine species occurs off the Kurile Islands.

== Habitat ==
This species is found in the following habitats:

- Brackish
- Marine
