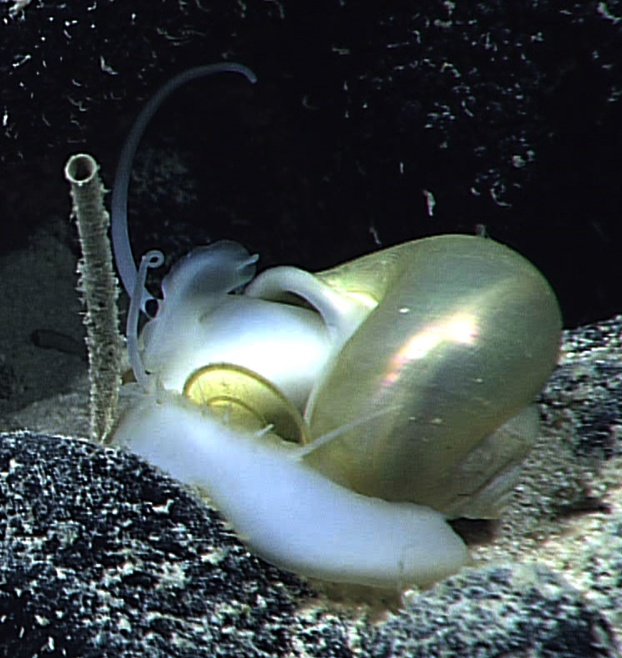
- Gaza daedala

Scientific classification
- Kingdom: Animalia
- Phylum: Mollusca
- Class: Gastropoda
- Subclass: Vetigastropoda
- Order: Trochida
- Superfamily: Trochoidea
- Family: Margaritidae; Thiele, 1924

Synonyms
- Gazidae Hickman & McLean, 1990; Gazini Hickman & J. H. McLean, 1990 (original rank); Margaritinae Thiele, 1924 (original rank); Margaritinae Stoliczka, 1868 (invalid: type genus (Margarita Leach, 1819) a junior homonym)

= Margaritidae =

Family of gastropods

Margaritidae is a family of small sea snails, marine gastropod mollusks in the superfamily Trochoidea (according to the taxonomy of the Gastropoda by Bouchet & Rocroi, 2005).

Margaritinae Thiele, 1924, originally a subfamily in Trochidae was moved to Turbinidae following Williams et al. 2007. It has been elevated to the rank of family Margaritidae. This family has no subfamilies.

== Genera ==
Genera within the family Margaritidae include:

- Anomphalogaza Hickman, 2012
- Antimargarita Powell, 1951
- Callogaza Dall, 1881
- Gaza Watson, 1879
- Margarites Gray, 1847

Genera brought into synonymy

- Eumargarita P. Fischer, 1885: synonym of Margarites Gray, 1847
- Margarita Leach, 1819: synonym of Margarites Gray, 1847
- Margaritopsis Thiele, 1906: synonym of Margarites Leach, 1847 (a junior synonym)
- Omphalomargarites T. Habe & Ki. Ito, 1965: synonym of Margarites Leach, 1847 (junior subjective synonym)
- Pupillaria Dall, 1909 : synonym of Margarites Leach, 1847
- Valvatella Gray, 1857: synonym of Margarites Gray, 1847
