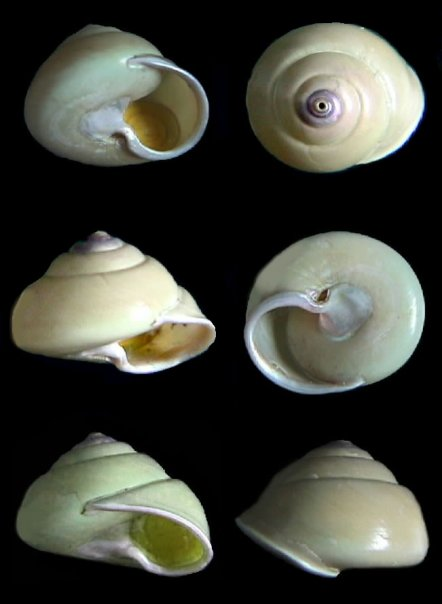
- Various views of shells of Gaza superba with the operculum visible in place

Scientific classification
- Kingdom: Animalia
- Phylum: Mollusca
- Class: Gastropoda
- Subclass: Vetigastropoda
- Order: Trochida
- Family: Margaritidae
- Genus: Gaza; Watson, 1879

Type species
- Gaza daedala R. B. Watson, 1879

Synonyms
- Gaza (Callogaza) Dall, 1881

= Gaza (gastropod) =

Genus of gastropods

Gaza is a genus of sea snails, marine gastropod mollusks in the family Margaritidae.

== Description ==
An examination of the soft parts of a species of the genus Gaza, by Dall showed the operculum to be very thin, light brown, and with about seven whorls.

The animal was of a whitish color without any spots or markings, and with very large black eyes set on a good-sized peduncle closely adjacent to and behind the tentacles. There is a single narrow gill in the usual position. The tentacles are long, large, and rather slender. The foot is short, broad, and bluntly rounded in front, behind almost truncate. In fact the contracted specimen looked almost as if there was a broad posterior indentation in the middle line. The muzzle is long, narrow, subcylindrical above and transversely expanded at its distal end, which is semi-lunar with a densely papillose surface and fringed edges. This expansion is nearly three times as wide as the stem of the muzzle. The epipodium (the lateral grooves between foot and mantle) has a large lobe behind the eye peduncle but is not connected with it. Behind the lobe is one long process and then a shorter one. The frill behind is merely puckered, but from under the borders of the operculum on each side protrude three good-sized processes. Behind the opercular lobe the epipodium terminates in a prominent point, concave and papillose on its upper surface. There are no frontal lobes between the tentacula. The epipodial point extends some distance behind the posterior end of the foot. The jaw is like that of Calliostoma in shape. It is composed of brown four-sided translucent prismatic rodlets which give under the microscope a reticular marking of diamond-shaped spots to the surface of the jaw. The two sides are not united in the middle line. The radula closely resembles that of Lunella versicolor Gmelin as figured by Troschel (Geb. der Schnecken, ii, pi. 20, fig. 7), except that the bases of the rhachidian and lateral teeth are subcircular, and on a few of the scythe-shaped cusps of the numerous uncini (= the small teeth-like or hook-like structures on the radula) are a few denticles. There are five lateral teeth, and between twenty and thirty uncini.

The nucleus of Gaza superba is often caducous, and in such specimens the apex is pierced with a circular perforation 1½ mm in diameter, which is continuous with the umbilicus. There does not appear to be any particular difference between the nucleus and the early whorls, its loss would therefore seem to be due merely to its fragility. In none of those in which it remains is there any indication of its being reinforced by a shelly deposit.

The species are all deep-sea dwellers, living mostly at depths of 180 m or greater

== Species ==
Species within the genus Gaza include:

- Gaza compta Simone & Cunha, 2006
- Gaza cubana Clench & Aguayo, 1940
- Gaza daedala Watson, 1879
- Gaza fischeri Dall, 1889
- Gaza olivacea Quinn, 1991
- Gaza polychoronos Vilvens, 2012
- Gaza rathbuni Dall, 1890
- Gaza superba (Dall, 1881)

Synonyms:

- Gaza frederici E. A. Smith, 1906: synonym of Callogaza frederici (E. A. Smith, 1906)
- Gaza sericata Kira, 1959: synonym of Callogaza sericata (Kira, 1959)
- Gaza watsoni (Dall, 1881): synonym of Callogaza watsoni Dall, 1881
