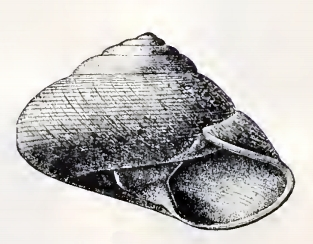
- Original drawing of a shell of Gaza fischeri

Scientific classification
- Kingdom: Animalia
- Phylum: Mollusca
- Class: Gastropoda
- Subclass: Vetigastropoda
- Order: Trochida
- Family: Margaritidae
- Genus: Gaza
- Species: G. fischeri

Binomial name
- Gaza fischeri Dall, 1889

= Gaza fischeri =

Species of gastropod

Gaza fischeri is a species of sea snail, a marine gastropod mollusc in the family Margaritidae.

== Description ==
(Original description by W.H. Dall) The size of the shell varies between 15 mm and 30 mm. This shell iconsists of six and a half whorls, and closely resembles Gaza daedala, except in the following particulars. It is much more depressed proportionally. The upper margin of the aperture is distinctly depressed below its general plane. The radiating lines, almost microscopic in Gaza daedala, are in this form impressed in the early whorls near the suture, so as to produce a succession of short ripples, following the recurved lines of growth, which give a fringe-like ornamentation to the suture, at the rate of about five ripples to a millimeter. The margin of the suture in this form is distinctly appressed, forming a narrow border. The operculum has about seven whorls. The umbilicus is completely floored over.

The soft parts are like those of Gaza superba, but the tentacles are shorter and stouter, the lateral lobes of the epipodium proportionally larger. There is one more lateral process, and the muzzle is not so much expanded laterally at its termination.

== Distribution ==
This species occurs in the Caribbean Sea, the Gulf of Mexico and the Lesser Antilles at depths between 604 m and 1061 m.
