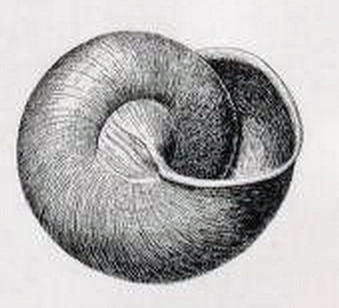
- Original drawing of a shell of Gaza rathbuni

Scientific classification
- Kingdom: Animalia
- Phylum: Mollusca
- Class: Gastropoda
- Subclass: Vetigastropoda
- Order: Trochida
- Family: Margaritidae
- Genus: Gaza
- Species: G. rathbuni

Binomial name
- Gaza rathbuni Dall, 1890

= Gaza rathbuni =

Species of gastropod

Gaza rathbuni, common name Rathbun's gaza, is a species of sea snail, a marine gastropod mollusc in the family Margaritidae.

== Description ==
The size of the discoid shell varies between 24 mm and 30 mm. The teleoconch consists of 4.5 weakly convex whorls. This species differs from Gaza superba by being more depressed, with stronger spiral grooving, a slightly smaller umbilicus, and more flattened over the sutures. The periostracum is olivaceous, polished, very thin and readily dehiscent. The operculum contains about seven whorls, thin and polished, slightly centrally concave, with a narrow thinner band marginating the coil.

The soft parts recall those of Gaza superba, but the muzzle seems shorter and there are seven slender, rather long epipodial filaments on the right side, instead of five as in Gaza superba.

== Distribution ==
This species occurs in the Pacific Ocean off the Galapagos Islands and the Gulf of Panama.
