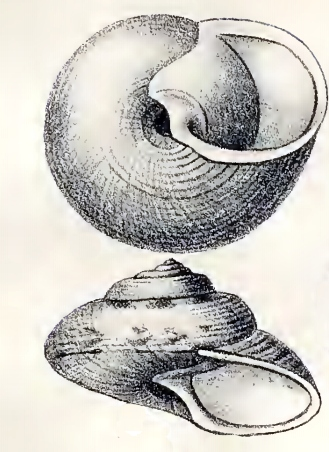
- Umbilical and top view of a shell of Callogaza watsoni

Scientific classification
- Kingdom: Animalia
- Phylum: Mollusca
- Class: Gastropoda
- Subclass: Vetigastropoda
- Order: Trochida
- Family: Margaritidae
- Genus: Callogaza; Dall, 1881

Type species
- Callogaza watsoni Dall, 1881

= Callogaza =

Genus of gastropods

Callogaza is a genus of sea snails, marine gastropod mollusks in the family Margaritidae.

== Description ==
The shells of the species in this genus are thin-walled and almost transparent. Because of this, they are iridescent. The outer lip is deflected. A flat callus of the inner lip covers completely or only in part the wide umbilicus (but only in fully grown species). These features form a synapomorphy with the genus Gaza.

The sculpture of Callogaza has stronger spiral and axial lines, in contrast with the almost uniform sculpture of Gaza. Calogaza possesses strong, elevated spiral cords in the upper part of each whorl. These are colored with brown spots.

== Species ==
Species within the genus Callogaza include:

- Callogaza colmani Hickman, 2012
- Callogaza frederici (E. A. Smith, 1906)
- Callogaza sericata (Kira, 1959)
- Callogaza watsoni Dall, 1881

Species brought into synonymy

- Callogaza rotella Dall, 1881: synonym of Microgaza rotella rotella (Dall, 1881)
- Callogaza superba Dall, 1881: synonym of Gaza superba (Dall, 1881)
