= Callogaza colmani =

Scientific classification
- Kingdom: Animalia
- Phylum: Mollusca
- Class: Gastropoda
- Subclass: Vetigastropoda
- Order: Trochida
- Superfamily: Trochoidea
- Family: Margaritidae
- Genus: Callogaza
- Species: C. colmani

Binomial name
- Callogaza colmani Hickman, 2012

Species of gastropod

Callogaza colmani is a species of sea snail, a marine gastropod mollusk in the family Margaritidae.
