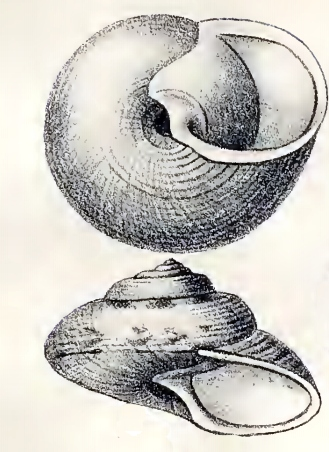
- Bottom and top view of a shell of Callogaza watsoni

Scientific classification
- Kingdom: Animalia
- Phylum: Mollusca
- Class: Gastropoda
- Subclass: Vetigastropoda
- Order: Trochida
- Superfamily: Trochoidea
- Family: Margaritidae
- Genus: Callogaza
- Species: C. watsoni

Binomial name
- Callogaza watsoni Dall, 1881

Synonyms
- Gaza watsoni Dall, 1881; Margarita filogyra Dall, 1881

= Callogaza watsoni =

Species of gastropod

Callogaza watsoni is a species of sea snail, a marine gastropod mollusk in the family Margaritidae.

== Description ==
The slightly nacreous shell reaches a length of 15 mm. It contains 6¼ whorls having the same general form as in Gaza fischeri, but with a more prominent nucleus. This nucleus is small, bulbous, and dark brown. The first 2½ whorls are glassy, brown spotted, smooth. Subsequently, the exterior two-thirds of the upper surface of the whorls are sculptured with four or five strong revolving threads. The space between them and the suture above contains strong, even, flexuously radiating, shining, rounded plications (about eight to a millimeter) which pass obliquely over the revolving threads and appear again on the base as strong regular plications in the umbilical region, extending from the umbilical carina one-third of the way toward the periphery. The base of the shell is covered with numerous revolving threads flattened until their interspaces appear like grooves. The umbilicus is similarly formed to Gaza fischeri, but somewhat more turreted internally. The body whorl is less contracted behind the lip, which is not produced forward above. The umbilical callus is not nacreous. It has a granular surface, white and covering less than half the umbilicus. The lip and the aperture oare only slightly nacreous. The base of the shell is waxy white. The top is the same, with cloudy radiating brown blotches near the suture and on the periphery. Some of the revolving threads are also continuously brown.

== Distribution ==
This species occurs in the Gulf of Mexico and in the Atlantic Ocean off Brazil.
