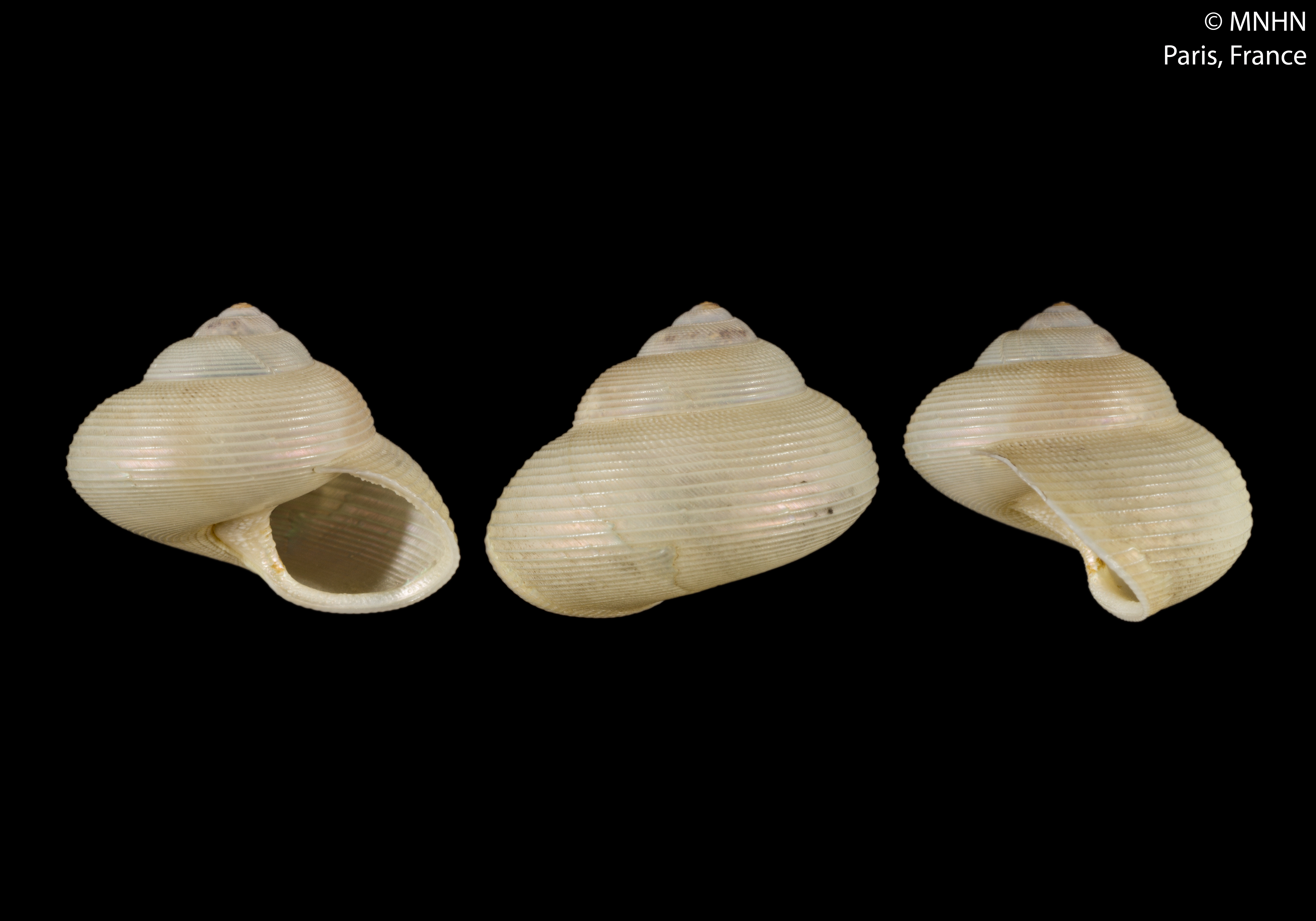
- Shell of Gaza polychoronos (holotype at MNHN, Paris)

Scientific classification
- Kingdom: Animalia
- Phylum: Mollusca
- Class: Gastropoda
- Subclass: Vetigastropoda
- Order: Trochida
- Family: Margaritidae
- Genus: Gaza
- Species: G. polychoronos

Binomial name
- Gaza polychoronos Vilvens, 2012

= Gaza polychoronos =

Species of gastropod

Gaza polychoronos is a species of sea snail, a marine gastropod mollusc in the family Margaritidae.

== Description ==
The height of the shell attains 18 mm.

== Distribution ==
This marine species occurs off the Society Islands, French Polynesia.
