= Gaza cubana =

Scientific classification
- Kingdom: Animalia
- Phylum: Mollusca
- Class: Gastropoda
- Subclass: Vetigastropoda
- Order: Trochida
- Family: Margaritidae
- Genus: Gaza
- Species: G. cubana

Binomial name
- Gaza cubana Clench & Aguayo, 1940

Synonyms
- Gaza superba cubana Clench & Aguayo, 1940 (basionym)

Species of gastropod

Gaza cubana is a species of sea snail, a marine gastropod mollusc in the family Margaritidae.

== Description ==
The size of the shell varies between 23 mm and 37 mm. The pale beige, discoid shell has a weak but marked spiral sculpture. But the first two whorls of the teleoconch have a purple color. The open umbilicus is only sealed for about 75% by the callus of the inner lip. The apex is preserved. The spire is low and flat.

== Distribution ==
This species occurs in the Caribbean Sea and the Gulf of Mexico at depths between 329 m and 1080 m.
