= Gaza compta =

Scientific classification
- Kingdom: Animalia
- Phylum: Mollusca
- Class: Gastropoda
- Subclass: Vetigastropoda
- Order: Trochida
- Family: Margaritidae
- Genus: Gaza
- Species: G. compta

Binomial name
- Gaza compta Simone & Cunha, 2006

Species of gastropod

Gaza compta is a species of sea snail, a marine gastropod mollusc in the family Margaritidae.

== Description ==
The size of the shell varies between 23 mm and 28 mm. The pale beige shell has a weak spiral sculpture. But the first two whorls of the teleoconch have a purple color and they show some marked axial undulations.

== Distribution ==
This species occurs in the Atlantic Ocean off Southeast Brazil at depths between 700 m and 800 m.
