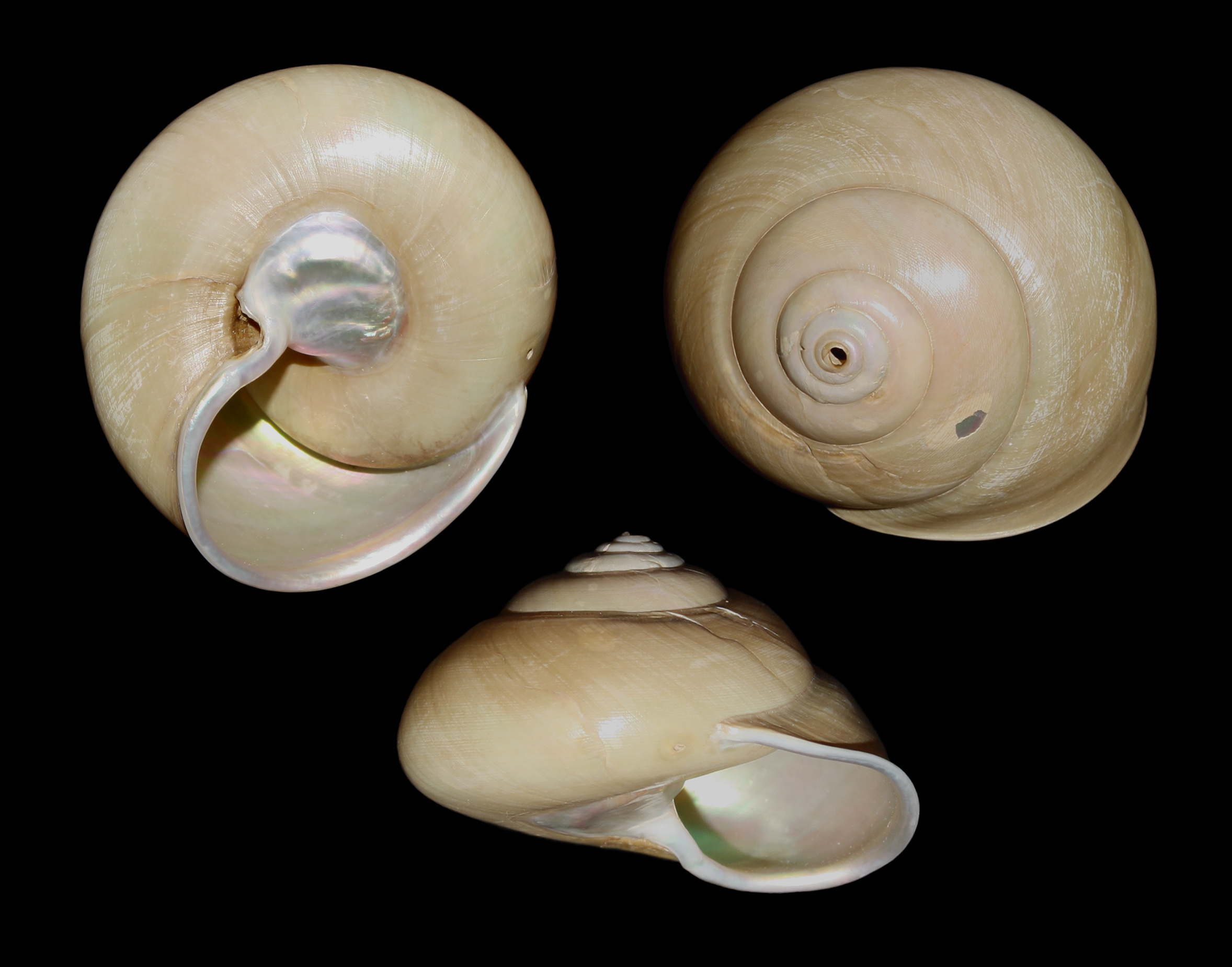

Scientific classification
- Kingdom: Animalia
- Phylum: Mollusca
- Class: Gastropoda
- Subclass: Vetigastropoda
- Order: Trochida
- Family: Margaritidae
- Genus: Gaza
- Species: G. olivacea

Binomial name
- Gaza olivacea Quinn, 1991

Synonyms
- Gaza superba auct. non Dall, 1881

= Gaza olivacea =

Species of gastropod

Gaza olivacea is a species of sea snail, a marine gastropod mollusc in the family Margaritidae.

== Description ==
The size of the shell varies between 25 mm and 45 mm.

== Distribution ==
This species occurs in the Caribbean Sea, the Gulf of Mexico and the Atlantic Ocean off Brazil at depths between 238 m and 808 m.
