= Callogaza sericata =

Scientific classification
- Kingdom: Animalia
- Phylum: Mollusca
- Class: Gastropoda
- Subclass: Vetigastropoda
- Order: Trochida
- Superfamily: Trochoidea
- Family: Margaritidae
- Genus: Callogaza
- Species: C. sericata

Binomial name
- Callogaza sericata (Kira, 1959)

Synonyms
- Gaza sericata Kira, 1959

Species of gastropod

Callogaza sericata is a species of sea snail, a marine gastropod mollusk in the family Margaritidae.

== Description ==
The size of the shell varies between 10 mm and 20 mm.

== Distribution ==
This marine occurs in the Northwest Pacific off the Philippines to Japan at depths between 50 m and 300 m.
