= Callogaza frederici =

Scientific classification
- Kingdom: Animalia
- Phylum: Mollusca
- Class: Gastropoda
- Subclass: Vetigastropoda
- Order: Trochida
- Superfamily: Trochoidea
- Family: Margaritidae
- Genus: Callogaza
- Species: C. frederici

Binomial name
- Callogaza frederici (E. A. Smith, 1906)

Synonyms
- Gaza frederici E. A. Smith, 1906; Gaza (Callogaza ?) frederici Smith, 1906

Species of gastropod

Callogaza frederici is a species of sea snail, a marine gastropod mollusk in the family Margaritidae.

== Distribution ==
This marine species occurs off South India and Sri Lanka.
