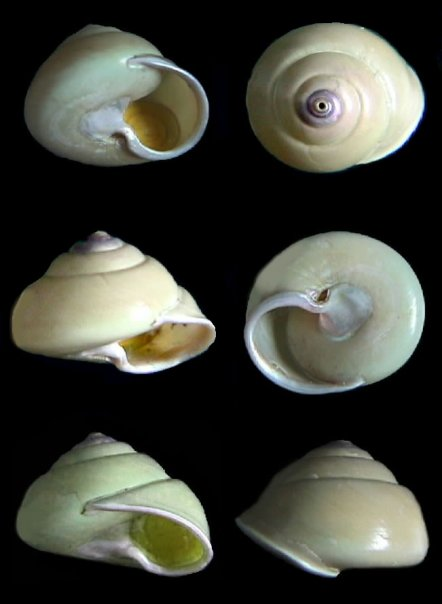
- Various views of shells of Gaza superba with the operculum visible in place

Scientific classification
- Kingdom: Animalia
- Phylum: Mollusca
- Class: Gastropoda
- Subclass: Vetigastropoda
- Order: Trochida
- Family: Margaritidae
- Genus: Gaza
- Species: G. superba

Binomial name
- Gaza superba (Dall, 1881)

Synonyms
- Callogaza superba Dall, 1881; Gaza superba Dall 1889; Gaza (Callogaza) superba Thiele 1929; Gaza watsoni Rios 1985

= Gaza superba =

Species of gastropod

Gaza superba, common name the superb gaza, is a species of deep sea sea snail, a marine gastropod mollusc in the family Margaritidae.

== Description ==
The shell is 2,5 to 4 cm. in width and present a somewhat elevated spire. The apex is open in adult stage. The umbilicus is about 75% covered by callus. The color of the shell is old ivory golden sheen. The early whorls are faintly wine colored. The operculum is circular and shows yellow to brown colors

(Original description W.H. Dall) Shell in general features recalling Gaza daedala, much of whose description would apply with little change to this species. The eight whorls are in the adult roundly shouldered below the suture, rounded at the periphery, somewhat flattened on the base, and deeply and widely umbilicated. The umbilicus is a little more than half covered by a nacreous callus. The first 2½ whorls are transparent, not nacreous, very obtuse with the nucleus not prominent. The next 3½ whorls are smooth, except for faintest lines of growth, glassy with the nacre shining through. The remainder of the shell is covered with delicate and distinct lines of growth, sometimes a little more pronounced near the suture, and by revolving lines almost too shallow to be called grooves. These are most prominent on the periphery, evanescent on the flattened part of the base and above near the suture. On the body whorl these are about 0.5 mm. apart. The region near the suture is almost smooth. The suture is very distinct, but not channelled. The umbilicus is bordered by an edge from which the flattened base falls away, and with straight walls forming an almost perfect cone. The body whorl is contracted just before the reflected lip, which, above, rounds out in advance of its junction with the suture, the last 6.3 mm of which descends on the whorl, giving the aperture a downward look. The aperture is oblique above, arching more nearly to a perpendicular below. smoothly, evenly reflected and thickened from the columella to the suture, with an internal channel behind the thickening. The columella is callous above, thinly and unevenly reflected half-way across the umbilicus, gently and very obliquely descending and smoothly passing into the basal part of the lip. The interior of the aperture, the lip, the umbilical callus, and a slight wash near the sutural junction, are brilliantly nacreous. The base and the body whorl within the aperture are not so. The upper surface of shell is distinctly tinted with fawn color, the base is waxen white, the nacre perceptible through the thinner portions.

== Distribution ==
Caribbean and Gulf of Mexico.

=== Habitat ===
Muddy sand bottom; from 380 to 925 m depth, mostly around 600 m depth.
