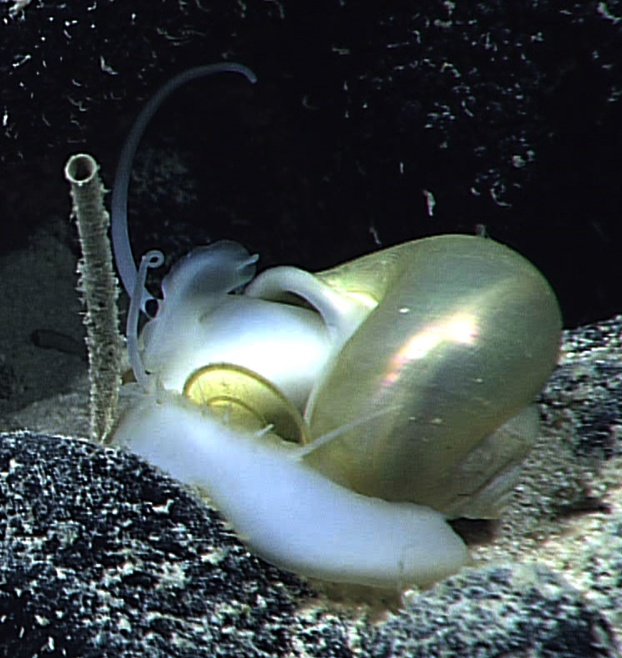
- Gaza daedala

Scientific classification
- Kingdom: Animalia
- Phylum: Mollusca
- Class: Gastropoda
- Subclass: Vetigastropoda
- Order: Trochida
- Family: Margaritidae
- Genus: Gaza
- Species: G. daedala

Binomial name
- Gaza daedala Watson, 1879

= Gaza daedala =

Species of gastropod

Gaza daedala is a species of sea snail, a marine gastropod mollusc in the family Margaritidae.

== Distribution ==
This marine species occurs in the Pacific Ocean off Fiji at a depth of 1100 m.

== Description ==
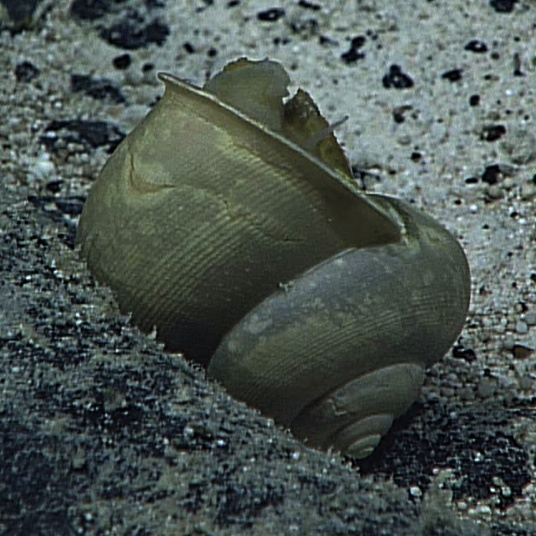
Gaza daedala

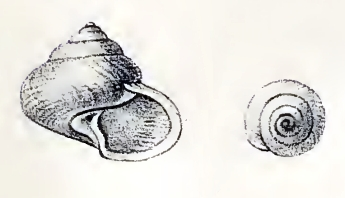
Drawing of apertural and apical view of a shell of Gaza daedala.

(Original description by Watson) The height of the shell attains 20.6 mm, its diameter 17 mm. The thin shell has a depressedly globose shape with a convexly conical spire. It is translucent, horny, nacreous in its whole texture, and iridescent on the surface. It has a slightly reverted and narrowly thickened lip and a thin edged twisted columella, the point of which runs out into a bluntly mucronated angle.

Sculpture: Longitudinals—the whole surface is covered with strong, puckered, oblique lines of growth, which are sharp-edged but flattened,. They are rather regular, with many minuter ones in the intervals. The longitudinals are crosshatched with spirals, which are stronger and more regular, but not perfectly uniform. They consist of square threads and furrows of equal breadth, and both scored by the longitudinals. On the earlier whorls these spirals disappear before the longitudinals do. And on the base of the shell they become on the outside feebler, closer, and finer, in the middle broader and flatter, and stronger again toward the centre of the shell.

The colorof the shell is delicate yellowish, with a horny translucency and exquisite iridescence, which under the lens appears brilliant.

The spire is high and slightly scalar. The apex is very small, flatly rounded, the embryonic 1½ whorl very slightly projecting. The seven whorls increase gradually. They are well rounded, the last slightly angulated below, and on the base flattened, but rather less so towards the aperture, where there is a slight contraction and downward turning of the whole whorl, without, however, any descending of the lip at its junction with the body. The suture is very distinct, but not impressed. The aperture is rather large, very oblique, semioval. The outer lip is reflected and thickened internally by a strong but narrow, equal, rounded, white pearly callus, which almost disappears just at the upper corner, and which has a very slight furrow round its margin. It does not descend at all.

Inner lip—from the corner of the outer lip a very thin layer of nacre spreads out a little way across the body, but then ceases entirely. The columella is spread out at its base as a confined, flattened, unevenly inclined, semicircular, iridescent umbilical pad. From the left corner of which the columella proper projects, it has a narrow but rounded edge, twisted, straight, bending to the left, and advances into a sharply angulated, and, as seen from behind, even mucronated junction with the basal aperture edge, to which the umbilical pad curving round the back of the pillar also attains. The inside is scored with the external sculpture, and is brilliantly iridescent. The umbilical pad is defined by a narrow furrow, and in front by a slightly tumid ridge, which is the least nacreous part of the whole shell. The operculum is membranaceous, horny, yellowish, with about six to seven turns, each strongly defined by a narrow line of thickening, and sharply scored with minute oblique radiating lines.
