= List of least concern molluscs =

- Extinct in the wild (EW): 13 species
- Critically endangered (CR): 581 species
- Endangered (EN): 507 species
- Vulnerable (VU): 879 species
- Near threatened (NT, LR/cd): 535 species
- Least concern (LC): 2,437 species
- Data deficient (DD): 1,988 species
Mollusc species (IUCN, 2020.1)
- 6941 extant species have been evaluated
- 4953 of those are fully assessed (Note: excludes data deficient evaluations.)
- 2972 are not threatened at present
- 1967 to 3955 are threatened (Note: Threatened comprises CR, EN and VU. Upper estimate additionally includes DD.)
- 324 to 441 are extinct or extinct in the wild:
  - 311 extinct (EX) species (Note: Chart omits extinct (EX) species)
  - 13 extinct in the wild (EW)
  - 117 possibly extinct [CR(PE)]
  - 0 possibly extinct in the wild [CR(PEW)]

In September 2016, the International Union for Conservation of Nature (IUCN) listed 2437 least concern mollusc species. Of all evaluated mollusc species, 34% are listed as least concern. The IUCN also lists five mollusc subspecies as least concern.

No subpopulations of molluscs have been evaluated by the IUCN.

This is a complete list of least concern mollusc species and subspecies evaluated by the IUCN.

== Gastropods ==
There are 1944 species and three subspecies of gastropod assessed as least concern.

=== Stylommatophora ===
Stylommatophora includes the majority of land snails and slugs. There are 599 species and one subspecies in the order Stylommatophora assessed as least concern.

==== Charopids ====
- Discocharopa aperta
- Discocharopa mimosa
- Letomola barrenensis
- Planilaoma luckmanii
- Semperdon heptaptychius

==== Streptaxids ====
- Edentulina dussumieri
- Gonospira funicula
- Gulella planti
- Seychellaxis souleyetianus
- Stereostele nevilli

==== Lauriids ====
- Hemilauria limnaeana
- Lauria fanalensis
- Lauria fasciolata
- Leiostyla anglica
- Leiostyla cheilogona
- Leiostyla fusca
- Leiostyla irrigua
- Leiostyla loweana
- Leiostyla millegrana
- Leiostyla monticola
- Leiostyla recta
- Leiostyla rugulosa
- Leiostyla sphinctostoma
- Leiostyla vincta

==== Vertiginids ====
- Columella columella
- Columella edentula
- Columella microspora
- Cylindrovertilla kingi
- Spelaeoconcha paganettii
- Staurodon seminulum
- Truncatellina cameroni
- Truncatellina monodon
- Truncatellina rothi
- Round-mouthed whorl snail (Vertigo genesii)
- Geyer's whorl snail (Vertigo geyeri)
- Vertigo ronnebyensis

==== Cochlicellids ====
- Monilearia caementitia
- Monilearia loweana
- Monilearia monilifera
- Monilearia oleacea
- Monilearia persimilis
- Monilearia umbicula
- Monilearia woodwardia
- Obelus mirandae
- Obelus moderatus

==== Trissexodontids ====
- Oestophora barbula
- Oestophora lusitanica
- Oestophora silvae
- Oestophorella buvinieri
- Suboestophora boscae
- Trissexodon constrictus

==== Helicids ====
Species

- Allognathus graellsianus
- Allognathus hispanicus
- Arianta aethiops
- Copse snail (Arianta arbustorum)
- Cantareus apertus
- Cattania haberhaueri
- Cattania kattingeri
- Cattania rumelica
- Cattania trizona
- Causa holosericea
- White-lipped snail (Cepaea hortensis)
- Grove snail (Cepaea nemoralis)
- Hélice sylvatique (Cepaea sylvatica)
- Cepaea vindobonensis
- Chilostoma albanograeca
- Chilostoma amorgia
- Chilostoma apfelbecki
- Chilostoma arcadica
- Chilostoma argentellei
- Chilostoma bacchica
- Chilostoma brenskei
- Chilostoma byshekensis
- Chilostoma choristochila
- Chilostoma comythophora
- Chilostoma conemenosi
- Chilostoma cyclolabris
- Chilostoma desmoulinsii
- Chilostoma dochii
- Chilostoma dunjana
- Chilostoma eliaca
- Chilostoma faueri
- Chilostoma fontenillii
- Chilostoma frigidum
- Chilostoma fuchsiana
- Chilostoma glaciale
- Chilostoma heldreichi
- Chilostoma hemonica
- Chilostoma hirta
- Chilostoma hoffmanni
- Chilostoma hymetti
- Chilostoma insolita
- Chilostoma intermedium
- Chilostoma kleciachi
- Chilostoma kollari
- Chilostoma krueperi
- Chilostoma lefeburiana
- Chilostoma melpomene
- Chilostoma millieri
- Chilostoma moellendorffi
- Chilostoma nympha
- Chilostoma pelia
- Chilostoma phocaea
- Chilostoma pieperi
- Chilostoma polinskii
- Chilostoma polyhymnia
- Chilostoma posthuma
- Chilostoma pouzolzi
- Chilostoma serbica
- Chilostoma setigera
- Chilostoma setosa
- Chilostoma sphaeriostoma
- Chilostoma squamatinum
- Chilostoma stenomphala
- Chilostoma subaii
- Chilostoma subzonata
- Chilostoma valkanovi
- Chilostoma zonatum
- Cylindrus obtusus
- Faustina cingulella
- Faustina faustina
- Faustina illyrica
- Lapidary snail (Helicigona lapicida)
- Helix albescens
- Helix asemnis
- Helix cincta
- Helix dormitoris
- Helix figulina
- Helix lutescens
- Helix nucula
- Helix philibinensis
- Helix pomacella
- Helix pomatia
- Helix secernenda
- Helix vladica
- Hemicycla bidentalis
- Hemicycla consobrina
- Hemicycla flavistoma
- Hemicycla fulgida
- Hemicycla glasiana
- Hemicycla invernicata
- Hemicycla melchori
- Hemicycla perraudierei
- Hemicycla sarcostoma
- Iberus angustatus
- Iberus guiraoanus
- Iberus marmoratus
- Isognomostoma isognomostomos
- Levantina spiriplana
- Macularia niciensis
- Marmorana globularis
- Marmorana muralis
- Marmorana serpentina
- Pseudotachea splendida
- Superba skipetarica

Subspecies

- Hemicycla glyceia glyceia

==== Hygromiids ====
- Actinella arcta
- Actinella fausta
- Actinella lentiginosa
- Actinella nitidiuscula
- Ashfordia granulata
- Canariella berthelotii
- Canariella falkneri
- Canariella giustii
- Canariella gomerae
- Canariella lanosa
- Canariella multigranosa
- Canariella planaria
- Canariella plutonia
- Canariella subhispidula
- Canariella tenuicostulata
- Candidula arganica
- Candidula belemensis
- Candidula camporroblensis
- Candidula codia
- Candidula gigaxii
- Wrinkled snail (Candidula intersecta)
- Candidula lernaea
- Candidula najerensis
- Candidula olisippensis
- Candidula rhabdotoides
- Candidula rocandioi
- Candidula syrensis
- Candidula unifasciata
- Caseolus abjectus
- Caseolus commixtus
- Caseolus consors
- Caseolus hartungi
- Caseolus innominatus
- Caseolus punctulatus
- Caseolus setulosus
- Cernuella aginnica
- Cernuella cisalpina
- Cernuella neglecta
- Ciliella ciliata
- Cyrnotheba corsica
- Discula calcigena
- Discula polymorpha
- Discula rotula
- Disculella madeirensis
- Euomphalia strigella
- Ganula lanuginosa
- Helicella cistorum
- Helicella iberica
- Heath snail (Helicella itala)
- Helicella juglans
- Helicella ordunensis
- Helicella striatitala
- Helicopsis cereoflava
- Helicopsis cypriola
- Helicopsis filimargo
- Helicopsis gittenbergeri
- Helicopsis instabilis
- Helicopsis retowskii
- Helicopsis striata
- Helicotricha carusoi
- Heterostoma pauperculum
- Hiltrudia kusmici
- Hiltrudia mathildae
- Hygromia cinctella
- Hygromia limbata
- Hystricella echinulata
- Ichnusotricha berninii
- Scaly snail of Doboz (Kovacsia kovacsi)
- Leptaxis azorica
- Leptaxis drouetiana
- Leptaxis groviana
- Leptaxis membranacea
- Leptaxis nivosa
- Leptaxis sanctaemariae
- Leptaxis simia
- Leptaxis terceirana
- Lozekia deubeli
- Lozekia transsilvanica
- Mengoana jeschaui
- Metafruticicola andrius
- Metafruticicola berytensis
- Metafruticicola coartatus
- Metafruticicola dictaeus
- Metafruticicola noverca
- Metafruticicola occidentalis
- Metafruticicola pellitus
- Metafruticicola redtenbacheri
- Metafruticicola sublecta
- Metafruticicola zonella
- Monacha aniliensis
- Monacha atacis
- Monacha cantiana
- Monacha carascaloides
- Monacha cartusiana
- Monacha cemenelea
- Monacha claustralis
- Monacha cretica
- Monacha dofleini
- Monacha emigrata
- Monacha frequens
- Monacha fruticola
- Monacha haussknechti
- Monacha liebegottae
- Monacha maasseni
- Monacha messenica
- Monacha microtricha
- Monacha ocellata
- Monacha parumcincta
- Monacha pseudorothii
- Monacha rothii
- Monacha solidior
- Monacha syriaca
- Monachoides bacescui
- Monachoides incarnatus
- Monachoides taraensis
- Monachoides vicinus
- Montserratina martorelli
- Moreletina horripila
- Moreletina vespertina
- Perforatella bidentata
- Perforatella dibothrion
- Petasina bakowskii
- Petasina bielzi
- Petasina edentula
- Petasina filicina
- Petasina leucozona
- Petasina lurida
- Petasina unidentata
- Ponentina martigena
- Ponentina ponentina
- Green snail (Ponentina subvirescens)
- Portugala inchoata
- Pseudocampylaea portosanctana
- Pseudotrichia rubiginosa
- Pseudoxerophila bathytera
- Pseudoxerophila confusa
- Pseudoxerophila oertzeni
- Pyrenaearia cantabrica
- Pyrenaearia carascalensis
- Semifruticicola costulata
- Spirorbula depauperata
- Spirorbula latens
- Spirorbula obtecta
- Trochoidea caroni
- Trochoidea elegans
- Trochulus clandestinus
- Trochulus erjaveci
- Hairy snail (Trochulus hispidus)
- Trochulus lubomirskii
- Trochulus phorochaetia
- Trochulus sericeus
- Strawberry snail (Trochulus striolatus)
- Trochulus villosulus
- Trochulus villosus
- Trochulus waldemari
- Urticicola glabellus
- Urticicola umbrosus
- Xerocampylaea zelebori
- Xerocrassa amphiconus
- Xerocrassa barceloi
- Xerocrassa caroli
- Xerocrassa claudia
- Xerocrassa claudiconus
- Xerocrassa cretica
- Xerocrassa derogata
- Xerocrassa franciscoi
- Xerocrassa frater
- Xerocrassa grabusana
- Xerocrassa heraklea
- Xerocrassa homeyeri
- Xerocrassa kydonia
- Xerocrassa lasithiensis
- Xerocrassa meda
- Xerocrassa mesostena
- Xerocrassa nicosiana
- Xerocrassa penchinati
- Xerocrassa poecilodoma
- Xerocrassa ripacurcica
- Xerocrassa rithymna
- Xerocrassa siderensis
- Xerocrassa siphnica
- Xerocrassa subrogata
- Xerocrassa subvariegata
- Xerolenta macedonica
- Xerolenta spiruloides
- Xerolenta thasia
- Xeromunda alticola
- Xeromunda candiota
- Xeromunda peloponnesia
- Xeromunda thessalica
- Xeromunda vulgarissima
- Xeropicta akrotirica
- Xeropicta ledereri
- Xerosecta arigonis
- Xerosecta cespitum
- Xerosecta introducta
- Xerosecta promissa
- Xerotricha adoptata
- Xerotricha corderoi
- Xerotricha gonzalezi
- Xerotricha jamuzensis
- Xerotricha lancerottensis
- Xerotricha madritensis
- Xerotricha nubivaga
- Xerotricha orbignii
- Xerotricha silosensis
- Brown snail (Zenobiella subrufescens)

==== Vitrinids ====
- Eucobresia diaphana
- Oligolimax cephalonica
- Plutonia atlantica
- Plutonia behnii
- Plutonia blauneri
- Plutonia brevispira
- Plutonia brumalis
- Plutonia eceroensis
- Plutonia finitima
- Plutonia gomerensis
- Plutonia lamarckii
- Plutonia laxata
- Plutonia marcida
- Plutonia media
- Plutonia nitida
- Plutonia nogalesi
- Plutonia oromii
- Plutonia pelagica
- Plutonia ripkeni
- Plutonia ruivensis
- Plutonia solemi
- Plutonia taburientensis
- Plutonia tamaranensis
- Semilimacella bonellii
- Semilimacella carniolica
- Semilimax carinthiacus
- Semilimax kotulae
- Semilimax pyrenaicus
- Semilimax semilimax

==== Chondrinids ====
- Abida attenuata
- Abida bigerrensis
- Abida cylindrica
- Abida occidentalis
- Abida partioti
- Abida polyodon
- Abida pyrenaearia
- Abida secale
- Abida vasconica
- Chondrina ascendens
- Chondrina avenacea
- Chondrina bigorriensis
- Chondrina calpica
- Chondrina farinesii
- Chondrina generosensis
- Chondrina kobelti
- Chondrina kobeltoides
- Chondrina lusitanica
- Chondrina megacheilos
- Chondrina multidentata
- Chondrina spelta
- Chondrina tenuimarginata
- Granaria braunii
- Granaria frumentum
- Granaria stabilei
- Solatopupa juliana
- Solatopupa similis

==== Enids ====
- Brephulopsis bidens
- Brephulopsis cylindrica
- Brephulopsis subulata
- Buliminus carneus
- Chondrula beieri
- Chondrula macedonica
- Chondrula microtragus
- Chondrula peloponnesica
- Chondrula pindica
- Chondrula quinquedentata
- Chondrula tricuspidata
- Chondrula werneri
- Chondrus tournefortianus
- Chondrus zebra
- Ena concolor
- Ena montana
- Ena monticola
- Ena subtilis
- Eubrephulus bicallosa
- Euchondrus ledereri
- Euchondrus nucifragus
- Euchondrus parreyssi
- Jaminia loewii
- Jaminia quadridens
- Jaminia thiesseanus
- Mastus abundans
- Mastus alpicolus
- Mastus athensis
- Mastus bielzi
- Mastus butoti
- Mastus carneolus
- Mastus cretensis
- Mastus dirphicus
- Mastus etuberculatus
- Mastus gittenbergeri
- Mastus giuricus
- Mastus grandis
- Mastus hemmeni
- Mastus ierapetrana
- Mastus itanosensis
- Mastus olivaceus
- Mastus procax
- Mastus pusio
- Mastus riedeli
- Mastus rossmaessleri
- Mastus sitiensis
- Mastus sphakiota
- Mastus subaii
- Mastus transsylvanicus
- Mastus turgidus
- Mastus venerabilis
- Mastus violacea
- Meijeriella canaliculata
- Lesser bulin (Merdigera obscura)
- Multidentula lamellifera
- Multidentula ovularis
- Multidentula squalina
- Multidentula stylus
- Napaeopsis cefalonica
- Napaeopsis mennoi
- Napaeopsis merditanus
- Napaeopsis minima
- Napaeopsis ossica
- Napaeus alabastrinus
- Napaeus atlanticus
- Napaeus badiosus
- Napaeus baeticatus
- Napaeus bajamarensis
- Napaeus barquini
- Napaeus bechi
- Napaeus bertheloti
- Napaeus delibutus
- Napaeus encaustus
- Napaeus hartungi
- Napaeus helvolus
- Napaeus moquinianus
- Napaeus obesatus
- Napaeus pruninus
- Napaeus pygmaeus
- Napaeus rufobrunneus
- Napaeus tabidus
- Napaeus tenoensis
- Napaeus tremulans
- Napaeus variatus
- Napaeus vulgaris
- Paramastus cyprius
- Pseudochondrula seductilis
- Rhabdoena cosensis
- Thoanteus ferrarii
- Thoanteus gibber
- Turanena hemmeni
- Zebrina fasciolata
- Zebrina kindermanni
- Zebrina varnensis

==== Argnids ====
- Agardhiella armata
- Agardhiella biarmata
- Agardhiella caesa
- Agardhiella domokosi
- Agardhiella formosa
- Agardhiella incerta
- Agardhiella lamellata
- Agardhiella macrodonta
- Agardhiella parreyssii
- Agardhiella skipetarica
- Agardhiella stenostoma
- Agardhiella truncatella
- Agardhiella zoltanorum
- Argna bielzi
- Argna biplicata
- Argna ferrari
- Argna thracica

==== Helicodontids ====
- Atenia quadrasi
- Helicodonta angigyra
- Helicodonta obvoluta
- Lindholmiola barbata
- Lindholmiola corcyrensis
- Lindholmiola girva
- Lindholmiola lens
- Lindholmiola pirinensis
- Lindholmiola regisborisi
- Lindholmiola reischuetzi
- Lindholmiola spectabilis

==== Orculids ====
- Odontocyclas kokeilii
- Orcula austriaca
- Orcula conica
- Orcula dolium
- Orcula gularis
- Orcula jetschini
- Orcula restituta
- Orcula schmidtii
- Orcula tolminensis
- Orculella astirakiensis
- Orculella creantirudis
- Orculella creticostata
- Orculella cretilasithi
- Orculella cretimaxima
- Orculella cretiminuta
- Orculella cretioreina
- Orculella critica
- Orculella diensis
- Orculella exaggerata
- Orculella fodela
- Orculella franciscoi
- Orculella ignorata
- Orculella scalaris
- Orculella sirianocoriensis
- Pagodulina epirotes
- Pagodulina hauseri
- Pagodulina kaeufeli
- Pagodulina klemmi
- Pagodulina pagodula
- Pagodulina sparsa
- Pagodulina subdola
- Walklea rossmaessleri

==== Other Stylommatophora species ====
- Acanthinula azorica
- Amplirhagada elevata
- Cochlicopa nitens
- Ctenophila salaziensis
- Iowa Pleistocene snail (Discus macclintocki)
- Elasmias apertum
- Escargot de Quimper (Elona quimperiana)
- Fruticicola fruticum
- Kerry slug (Geomalacus maculosus)
- Helicarion australis
- Helicostyla collodes
- Helicostyla velata
- Kimberleytrachia crawfordi
- Kororia palaensis
- Lamellidea oblonga
- Lamellidea pusilla
- Palaua minor
- Partula micans
- Placostylus fulguratus
- Placostylus morosus
- Prymnbriareus nimberlinus
- Pupilla alpicola
- Moss chrysalis snail (Pupilla muscorum)
- Pupilla pupula
- Pupisoma orcula
- Setobaudinia collingii
- Spermodea monas

=== Littorinimorpha ===
There are 311 species and one subspecies in the order Littorinimorpha assessed as least concern.

==== Hydrobiids ====
- Adriohydrobia gagatinella
- Alzoniella cantabrica
- Alzoniella lucensis
- Alzoniella ovetensis
- Alzoniella pellitica
- Alzoniella slovenica
- Antibaria notata
- Suwannee hydrobe (Aphaostracon hypohyalinum)
- Arganiella pescei
- Ascorhis occidua
- Ascorhis tasmanica
- Austropyrgus bungoniensis
- Austropyrgus centralia
- Austropyrgus eumekes
- Austropyrgus niger
- Austropyrgus ora
- Austropyrgus parvus
- Austropyrgus pusillus
- Austropyrgus rectoides
- Austropyrgus ronkershawi
- Austropyrgus salvus
- Austropyrgus sinuatus
- Austropyrgus smithii
- Austropyrgus tumidus
- Avenionia brevis
- Avenionia ligustica
- Beddomeia trochiformis
- Belgrandia mariatheresiae
- Belgrandia thermalis
- Belgrandiella fontinalis
- Belgrandiella haesitans
- Belgrandiella saxatilis
- Bythinella austriaca
- Bythinella batalleri
- Bythinella baudoni
- Bythinella bicarinata
- Bythinella charpentieri
- Bythinella dacica
- Bythinella drimica
- Bythinella ferussina
- Bythinella metarubra
- Bythinella opaca
- Karst snail of Torna (Bythinella pannonica)
- Bythinella pupoides
- Bythinella reyniesii
- Bythinella rufescens
- Bythinella simoniana
- Bythinella utriculus
- Bythiospeum articense
- Bythiospeum bourguignati
- Bythiospeum bressanum
- Bythiospeum charpyi
- Bythiospeum dorvani
- Bythiospeum francomontanum
- Bythiospeum garnieri
- Bythiospeum leruthi
- Bythiospeum quenstedti
- Bythiospeum rhenanum
- Caldicochlea globosa
- Caldicochlea harrisi
- Caspia knipowitchi
- Caspia makarovi
- Catapyrgus matapango
- Catapyrgus spelaeus
- Clenchiella microscopica
- Cochliopina tryoniana
- Rocky Mountain duskysnail (Colligyrus greggi)
- Fluvidona simsoniana
- Globuliana gaillardotii
- Graziana alpestris
- Graziana lacheineri
- Graziana pupula
- Grossuana angeltsekovi
- Hadziella anti
- Hadziella ephippiostoma
- Halopyrgus pagodulus
- Halopyrgus pupoides
- Hauffenia subpiscinalis
- Hauffenia tellinii
- Heleobops docima
- Hemistomia minutissima
- Horatia klecakiana
- Hydrobia acuta
- Hydrobia longiscata
- Hydrobia musaensis
- Hydrobia recta
- Hydrobia ventrosa
- Hydrobia vitrea
- Iglica absoloni
- Iglica concii
- Iglica forumjuliana
- Islamia minuta
- Islamia moquiniana
- Islamia piristoma
- Islamia pusilla
- Jardinella carnarvonensis
- Josefus aitanica
- Leptopyrgus tainui
- Lithococcus multicarinatus
- Lithoglyphus fuscus
- Lithoglyphus naticoides
- Litthabitella chilodia
- Bantum hydrobe (Littoridinops palustris)
- Lobogenes spiralis
- Halcyon marstonia (Marstonia halcyon)
- Royal marstonia (Marstonia ogmoraphe)
- Mercuria anatina
- Mercuria similis
- Meridiopyrgus muaupoko
- Neoprososthenia hanseni
- Neoprososthenia iijimai
- Neoprososthenia poirieri
- Obtusopyrgus alpinus
- Opacuincola delira
- Paladilhiopsis robiciana
- Paladilhiopsis virei
- Paraprososthenia adami
- Paraprososthenia fischerpiettei
- Paraprososthenia vivonai
- Pauluccinella minima
- Phrantela angulifera
- Phrantela bobbrowni
- Phrantela pupiformis
- Phrantela umbilicata
- Potamolithus conicus
- Potamolithus lapidum
- Potamolithus paranensis
- Potamolithus simplex
- New Zealand mud snail (Potamopyrgus antipodarum)
- Potamopyrgus ciliatus
- Potamopyrgus dawbini
- Potamopyrgus estuarinus
- Pseudamnicola bilgini
- Pseudamnicola brusiniana
- Pseudamnicola moussonii
- Pseudamnicola spirata
- Pseudamnicola troglobia
- Pseudavenionia pedemontana
- Pseudotricula eberhardi
- Pyrgophorus parvulus
- Pyrgula annulata
- Oasis Valley springsnail (Pyrgulopsis micrococcus)
- Jackson lake springsnail (Pyrgulopsis robusta)
- Yaqui springsnail (Pyrgulopsis stearnsiana)
- Wong's springsnail (Pyrgulopsis wongi)
- Radomaniola albanica
- Radomaniola curta
- Radomaniola montana
- Rakipyrgus gardneri
- Rakiurapyrgus cresswelli
- Rehderiella parva
- Sadleriana fluminensis
- Sadleriana sadleriana
- Sadleriana schmidtii
- Panhandle pebblesnail (Somatogyrus virginicus)
- Trochidrobia punicea
- Turcorientalia seminula
- Turricaspia caspia
- Turricaspia lincta
- Turricaspia lindholmiana
- Turricaspia triton
- Turricaspia variabilis
- Victodrobia burni
- Victodrobia elongata
- Vinodolia vidrovani

==== Cochliopids ====
- Heleobia cuzcoensis
- Heleobia davisi
- Lagoon spire snail (Heleobia stagnorum)
- Smooth-ribbed hydrobe (Tryonia aequicostata)
- Tryonia porrecta
- Cottonball marsh tryonia (Tryonia salina)

==== Bithyniids ====
Species

- Bithynia cerameopoma
- Bithynia fuchsiana
- Bithynia funiculata
- Bithynia italica
- Bithynia leachii
- Bithynia misella
- Bithynia phialensis
- Bithynia pulchella
- Bithynia radomani
- Bithynia siamensis
- Common bithynia (Bithynia tentaculata)
- Gabbia kessneri
- Gabbia orcula
- Gabbia stenothyroides
- Gabbia travancorica
- Gabbiella africana
- Gabbiella humerosa
- Gabbiella kisalensis
- Gabbiella parvipila
- Gabbiella schweinfurthi
- Gabbiella senaariensis
- Gabbiella stanleyi
- Hydrobioides nassa
- Mysorella costigera
- Parafossarulus eximius
- Pseudobithynia hamicensis
- Sierraia whitei
- Wattebledia siamensis

Subspecies

- Gabbiella humerosa humerosa

==== Moitessieriids ====
- Moitessieria lescherae
- Moitessieria locardi
- Moitessieria rolandiana
- Moitessieria simoniana
- Paladilhia conica
- Paladilhia pleurotoma
- Spiralix rayi

==== Assimineids ====
- Angustassiminea castanea
- Assiminea beddomeana
- Assiminea bifasciata
- Red mangrove shell (Assiminea brevicula)
- Assiminea eliae
- Assiminea francesiae
- Assiminea globulus
- Dun sentinel (Assiminea grayana)
- Assiminea latericea
- Assiminea microsculpta
- Assiminea nitida
- Assiminea obtusa
- Assiminea philippinica
- Assiminea theobaldiana
- Assiminea woodmasoniana
- Cyclotropis bedaliensis
- Cyclotropis carinata
- Cyclotropis terae
- Omphalotropis bifilaris
- Omphalotropis cheynei
- Omphalotropis moussoni
- Omphalotropis parva
- Paludinella littorina
- Paludinella sicana

==== Pomatiopsids ====
- Coxiella exposita
- Coxiella glabra
- Coxiella striatula
- Halewisia expansa
- Hubendickia crooki
- Hubendickia sulcata
- Hydrorissoia gracilis
- Hydrorissoia hospitalis
- Hydrorissoia paviei
- Hydrorissoia trispirales
- Jullienia harmandi
- Jullienia rolfbrandti
- Karelainia davisi
- Lacunopsis cainiewa
- Lacunopsis concava
- Lacunopsis conica
- Lacunopsis harmandi
- Lacunopsis jullieni
- Lacunopsis levayi
- Lacunopsis minuta
- Neotricula aperta
- Neotricula burchi
- Oncomelania hupensis
- Pachydrobia bavayi
- Pachydrobia munensis
- Pachydrobia paradoxa
- Pachydrobia prasongi
- Pachydrobia siamensis
- Pachydrobia spinosa
- Pachydrobia variabilis
- Pachydrobia wykoffi
- Brown walker (Pomatiopsis cincinnatiensis)
- Tricula bollingi
- Tricula montana

==== Amnicolids ====
- Baicalia herderiana
- Baicalia korotnevi
- Emmericia patula
- Cobble sprite (Lyogyrus latus)
- Indented duskysnail (Lyogyrus retromargo)

==== Stenothyrids ====
- Gangetia miliacea
- Gangetia tigertti
- Stenothyra basisculpta
- Stenothyra blanfordiana
- Stenothyra cambodiensis
- Stenothyra confinis
- Stenothyra crooki
- Stenothyra cyrtochila
- Stenothyra deltae
- Stenothyra fasciata
- Stenothyra glabra
- Stenothyra glabrata
- Stenothyra hardouini
- Stenothyra hybocystoides
- Stenothyra jiraponi
- Stenothyra koratensis
- Stenothyra krungtepensis
- Stenothyra labiata
- Stenothyra mandahlbarthi
- Stenothyra messageri
- Stenothyra minima
- Stenothyra monilifera
- Stenothyra ornata
- Stenothyra ovalis
- Stenothyra polita
- Stenothyra schuetti
- Stenothyra soluta
- Stenothyra ventricosa

==== Iravadiids ====
- Iravadia cochinchinensis
- Iravadia mahimensis
- Iravadia ornata
- Iravadia reticulata
- Iravadia rohdei
- Iravadia sakaguchii

==== Other Littorinimorpha species ====
- Benedictia limnaeoides
- Chamlongia harinasutai
- Cymatium parthenopaeum
- Kobeltocochlea martensiana
- Littoraria undulata
- Pomatias raricosta
- Tropidophora pulchra
- Truncatella guerinii

=== Sorbeoconcha ===
There are 132 species and one subspecies in the order Sorbeoconcha assessed as least concern.

==== Pleurocerids ====
- Black-crest elimia (Elimia albanyensis)
- Knobby elimia (Elimia athearni)
- Cahaba elimia (Elimia cahawbensis)
- Fluted elimia (Elimia carinocostata)
- Club elimia (Elimia clavaeformis)
- Slackwater elimia (Elimia clenchi)
- Stately elimia (Elimia dickinsoni)
- Banded elimia (Elimia fascinans)
- Rusty elimia (Elimia godwini)
- Coldwater elimia (Elimia modesta)
- Pyramid elimia (Elimia potosiensis)
- Sprite elimia (Elimia proxima)
- Smooth elimia (Elimia simplex)
- Crested mudalia (Leptoxis carinata)
- Varicose rocksnail (Lithasia verrucosa)

==== Melanopsids ====
- Amphimelania holandrii
- Fagotia daudebartii
- Fagotia esperi
- Melanopsis buccinoidea
- Melanopsis costata
- Melanopsis doriae
- Melanopsis nodosa
- Melanopsis praemorsa
- Melanopsis saulcyi
- Melanopsis tricarinata
- Melanopsis trifasciata

==== Semisulcospirids ====
- Black juga (Juga nigrina)

==== Thiarids ====
- Doryssa hohenackeri
- Melanoides anomala
- Melanoides crenulata
- Melanoides jugicostis
- Melanoides lutosa
- Melanoides maculata
- Melanoides pyramis
- Melanoides recticosta
- Red-rimmed melania (Melanoides tuberculata)
- Melanoides victoriae
- Melanoides voltae
- Mieniplotia scabra
- Pachymelania aurita
- Pachymelania byronensis
- Pachymelania fusca
- Ripalania queenslandica
- Semisulcospira libertina
- Sermyla riqueti
- Sermyla venustula
- Stenomelania denisoniensis
- Tarebia granifera
- Tarebia lineata
- Thiara australis
- Thiara mirifica
- Thiara paludomoidea
- Thiara plicaria
- Thiara rudis

==== Pachychilids ====
- Brotia armata
- Brotia baccata
- Brotia beaumetzi
- Brotia binodosa
- Brotia costula
- Brotia dautzenbergiana
- Brotia episcopalis
- Brotia henriettae
- Brotia herculea
- Brotia manningi
- Brotia microsculpta
- Brotia pagodula
- Brotia peninsularis
- Brotia pseudoasperata
- Brotia pseudosulcospira
- Faunus ater
- Potadoma bicarinata
- Potadoma freethi
- Potadoma ignobilis
- Potadoma moerchi
- Sulcospira collyra
- Sulcospira dakrongensis
- Sulcospira hainanensis
- Sulcospira housei
- Sulcospira huegeli
- Sulcospira quangtriensis
- Sulcospira tonkiniana
- Sulcospira tourannensis
- Sulcospira vietnamensis

==== Paludomids ====
Species

- Anceya giraudi
- Bathanalia straeleni
- Bridouxia giraudi
- Bridouxia leucoraphe
- Bridouxia rotundata
- Chytra kirkii
- Cleopatra africana
- Cleopatra bulimoides
- Cleopatra elata
- Cleopatra ferruginea
- Cleopatra johnstoni
- Cleopatra nsendweensis
- Cleopatra smithi
- Hirthia globosa
- Lavigeria grandis
- Lavigeria nassa
- Lavigeria paucicostata
- Limnotrochus thomsoni
- Mysorelloides multisulcata
- Paludomus blanfordiana
- Paludomus conica
- Paludomus obesus
- Paludomus ornatus
- Paludomus petrosus
- Paludomus regulata
- Paludomus reticulata
- Paludomus stephanus
- Paludomus tanschuaricus
- Paramelania damoni
- Paramelania iridescens
- Potadomoides schoutedeni
- Pseudocleopatra togoensis
- Reymondia horei
- Reymondia minor
- Spekia coheni
- Spekia zonata
- Stormsia minima
- Syrnolopsis gracilis
- Syrnolopsis lacustris
- Syrnolopsis minuta
- Tiphobia horei
- Vinundu westae

Subspecies

- Cleopatra bulimoides bulimoides

==== Potamidids ====
- Cerithidea decollata
- Cerithidea ornata
- Horn shell (Cerithidea pliculosa)
- Coral cerith (Cerithium coralium)
- Pirenella conica
- Telescopium telescopium
- Mud-flat periwinkle (Tympanotonus fuscatus)

=== Architaenioglossa ===
There are 158 species in the order Architaenioglossa assessed as least concern.

==== Cyclophorids ====
- Cyathopoma blandfordi

==== Pupinids ====
- Pupina difficilis

==== Diplommatinids ====
- Cochlostoma achaicum
- Cochlostoma adamii
- Cochlostoma alleryanum
- Cochlostoma anomphale
- Cochlostoma apricum
- Cochlostoma auritum
- Cochlostoma bicostulatum
- Cochlostoma braueri
- Cochlostoma cinerascens
- Cochlostoma conicum
- Cochlostoma cretense
- Cochlostoma crosseanum
- Cochlostoma elegans
- Cochlostoma georgi
- Cochlostoma gigas
- Cochlostoma gracile
- Cochlostoma hellenicum
- Cochlostoma henricae
- Cochlostoma hidalgoi
- Cochlostoma hoyeri
- Cochlostoma macei
- Cochlostoma martorelli
- Cochlostoma montanum
- Cochlostoma nanum
- Cochlostoma nouleti
- Cochlostoma oscitans
- Cochlostoma partioti
- Cochlostoma patulum
- Cochlostoma philippianum
- Cochlostoma porroi
- Cochlostoma roseoli
- Cochlostoma sardoum
- Cochlostoma scalarinum
- Cochlostoma septemspirale
- Cochlostoma simrothi
- Cochlostoma sturanii
- Cochlostoma subalpinum
- Cochlostoma tergestinum
- Cochlostoma tessellatum
- Cochlostoma villae
- Cochlostoma waldemari
- Cochlostoma westerlundi
- Plectostoma crassipupa
- Plectostoma davisoni
- Plectostoma whitteni
- Striolata striolata

==== Aciculids ====
- Acicula corcyrensis
- Point snail (Acicula fusca)
- Acicula lineata
- Acicula lineolata
- Acicula szigethyannae
- Platyla banatica
- Platyla callostoma
- Platyla cryptomena
- Platyla curtii
- Platyla dupuyi
- Platyla gracilis
- Platyla microspira
- Platyla perpusilla
- Platyla pinteri
- Platyla polita
- Platyla similis
- Platyla stussineri
- Platyla wilhelmi
- Renea spectabilis
- Renea veneta

==== Viviparids ====
- Amuropaludina pachya
- Amuropaludina praerosa
- Angulyagra microchaetophora
- Angulyagra oxytropis
- Angulyagra polyzonata
- Bellamya bengalensis
- Bellamya capillata
- Bellamya constricta
- Bellamya unicolor
- Ovate campeloma (Campeloma geniculum)
- Campeloma rufum
- Cipangopaludina ampulliformis
- Cipangopaludina cathayensis
- Chinese mystery snail (Cipangopaludina chinensis)
- Cleaner snail (Cipangopaludina leucythoides)
- Cipangopaludina ussuriensis
- Cipangopaludina zejaensis
- Filopaludina filosa
- Filopaludina maekoki
- Filopaludina martensi
- Filopaludina sumatrensis
- Idiopoma dissimilis
- Idiopoma doliaris
- Idiopoma ingallsiana
- Idiopoma javanica
- Idiopoma simonis
- Idiopoma umbilicata
- Lecythoconcha lecythis
- Ridged lioplax (Lioplax subcarinata)
- Mekongia crassa
- Mekongia jullieni
- Mekongia pongensis
- Mekongia siamensis
- Mekongia sphaericula
- Mekongia swainsoni
- Neothauma tanganyicense
- River snail (Notopala essingtonensis)
- Notopala waterhousii
- Sinotaia aeruginosa
- Sinotaia arturrolli
- Sinotaia mandahlbarthi
- Sinotaia quadrata
- Trochotaia trochoides
- Viviparus acerosus
- Italian river snail (Viviparus ater)
- Lister's river snail (Viviparus contectus)
- Viviparus costae
- Rotund mysterysnail (Viviparus intertextus)
- Viviparus viviparus

==== Ampullariids ====
- Asolene petiti
- Asolene pulchella
- Felipponea neritiniformis
- Lanistes bicarinatus
- Lanistes carinatus
- Lanistes congicus
- Lanistes ellipticus
- Lanistes intortus
- Lanistes libycus
- Lanistes neavei
- Lanistes nsendweensis
- Lanistes ovum
- Lanistes purpureus
- Lanistes varicus
- Marisa cornuarietis
- Pila africana
- Pila ampullacea
- Pila cecillei
- Pila globosa
- Pila gracilis
- Pila occidentalis
- Pila ovata
- Pila pesmei
- Pila polita
- Pila scutata
- Pila theobaldi
- Pila virens
- Pila wernei
- Pomacea aldersoni
- Pomacea aurostoma
- Common apple snail (Pomacea bridgesii)
- Channeled applesnail (Pomacea canaliculata)
- Pomacea crosseana
- Pomacea glauca
- Pomacea lineata
- Florida applesnail (Pomacea paludosa)
- Pomella megastoma

==== Craspedopomatids ====
- Craspedopoma costata
- Craspedopoma mucronatum
- Craspedopoma neritoides
- Craspedopoma trochoideum

=== Lower Heterobranchia species ===
- Borysthenia naticina
- Glacidorbis hedleyi
- Glacidorbis tasmanicus
- Valvata aliena
- Glossy valvata (Valvata humeralis)
- Large mouthed valve snail (Valvata macrostoma)
- European stream valvata (Valvata piscinalis)
- Valvata saulcyi
- Valvata sibirica
- Mossy valvata (Valvata sincera)
- Valvata studeri

=== Cycloneritimorpha ===
There are 40 species in the order Cycloneritimorpha assessed as least concern.

==== Helicinids ====
- Palaeohelicina heterochroa
- Pleuropoma pelewensis
- Pleuropoma theobaldiana

==== Neritids ====
- Clithon bicolor
- Clithon chlorostomum
- Clithon corona
- Clithon faba
- Clithon flavovirens
- Clithon olivaceum
- Clithon oualaniensis
- Clithon reticularis
- Clithon sowerbyanus
- Nerita articulata
- Neritilia manoeli
- Neritina adansoniana
- Neritina afra
- Neritina bicanaliculata
- Neritina coromandeliana
- Neritina cristata
- Neritina glabrata
- Neritina obtusa
- Neritina oweniana
- Neritina pulligera
- Neritina smithi
- Neritina squamipicta
- Neritina sulculosa
- Neritina turtoni
- Red-mouth nerite snail (Neritina violacea)
- Virgin nerite (Neritina virginea)
- Neritina zigzag
- Septaria lineata
- Theodoxus fluviatilis
- Theodoxus heldreichi
- Theodoxus jordani
- Theodoxus meridionalis
- Theodoxus niloticus
- Theodoxus reticularis
- Theodoxus subthermalis
- Theodoxus varius

==== Neritiliids ====
- Platynerita rufa

=== Hygrophila species ===
There are 188 Hygrophila species assessed as least concern.

==== Physids ====
- Aplexa waterloti
- Haitia acuta
- Common bladder snail (Physa fontinalis)
- Physa marmorata
- Tadpole physa (Physella gyrina)
- Sibirenauta pictus

==== Acroloxids ====
- Lake limpet (Acroloxus lacustris)
- Acroloxus rossicus
- Acroloxus ussuriensis
- Baicalancylus kobelti
- Gerstfeldtiancylus benedictiae
- Pseudancylastrum dorogostajkii
- Pseudancylastrum sibiricum

==== Planorbids ====
- Africanogyrus coretus
- Amerianna obesula
- River limpet (Ancylus fluviatilis)
- Anisancylus dutrae
- Anisus centrifugops
- Anisus centrifugus
- Anisus kamtschaticus
- Anisus kolesnikovi
- Anisus leucostoma
- Anisus stroemi
- Anisus subfiliaris
- Twisted ram's-horn (Bathyomphalus contortus)
- Bayardella cosmeta
- Bayardella johni
- Biomphalaria alexandrina
- Biomphalaria angulosa
- Biomphalaria arabica
- Biomphalaria camerunensis
- Biomphalaria choanomphala
- Ghost ramshorn (Biomphalaria havanensis)
- Biomphalaria helophila
- Biomphalaria pfeifferi
- Biomphalaria schrammi
- Biomphalaria sudanica
- Bulinus abyssinicus
- Bulinus africanus
- Bulinus angolensis
- Bulinus beccarii
- Bulinus canescens
- Bulinus depressus
- Bulinus forskalii
- Bulinus globosus
- Bulinus jousseaumei
- Bulinus nasutus
- Bulinus natalensis
- Bulinus nyassanus
- Bulinus productus
- Bulinus reticulatus
- Bulinus scalaris
- Bulinus senegalensis
- Bulinus trigonus
- Bulinus tropicus
- Bulinus truncatus
- Bulinus ugandae
- Bulinus umbilicatus
- Bulinus wrighti
- Camptoceras jiraponi
- Camptoceras lineatum
- Ceratophallus bicarinatus
- Ceratophallus gibbonsi
- Ceratophallus kigeziensis
- Ceratophallus kisumiensis
- Ceratophallus natalensis
- Choanomphalus maacki
- Choanomphalus okhoticus
- Ridged rams-horn (Drepanotrema cimex)
- Ferrissia baconi
- Ferrissia dohrnianus
- Fragile ancylid (Ferrissia fragilis)
- Ferrissia gentilis
- Hood ancylid (Ferrissia mcneili)
- Ferrissia modesta
- Freshwater limpet (Ferrissia neozelanicus)
- Oblong ancylid (Ferrissia parallela)
- Ferrissia petterdi
- Ferrissia tanganyicensis
- Ferrissia tenuis
- Ferrissia verruca
- Glyptophysa aliciae
- Glyptophysa gibbosa
- Gundlachia ticaga
- Gyraulus albus
- Gyraulus barrackporensis
- Gyraulus chinensis
- Disk gyro (Gyraulus circumstriatus)
- Gyraulus connollyi
- Gyraulus convexiusculus
- Gyraulus corinna
- Gyraulus costulatus
- Star gyro (Gyraulus crista)
- Gyraulus ehrenbergi
- Gyraulus euphraticus
- Gyraulus gilberti
- Gyraulus hebraicus
- Gyraulus hesperus
- Gyraulus kahuica
- Gyraulus labiatus
- Smooth ram's horn snail (Gyraulus laevis)
- Gyraulus mauritianus
- Ash gyro (Gyraulus parvus)
- Gyraulus piscinarum
- Gyraulus rossmaessleri
- Gyraulus rotula
- Gyraulus siamensis
- Waterhouse's freshwater snail (Gyraulus waterhousei)
- Helicorbis australiensis
- Helicorbis cantori
- Flat ram's horn sail (Hippeutis complanatus)
- Indoplanorbis exustus
- Intha capitis
- Intha umbilicalis
- Dusky ancylid (Laevapex fuscus)
- Lentorbis benguelensis
- Lentorbis carringtoni
- Lentorbis junodi
- Bugle sprite (Micromenetus dilatatus)
- Penny sprite (Micromenetus floridensis)
- Physastra nasuta
- Great ram's horn snail (Planorbarius corneus)
- Bellmouth ramshorn (Planorbella campanulata)
- Mesa ramshorn (Planorbella scalaris)
- Marsh ramshorn (Planorbella trivolvis)
- Planorbis atticus
- Planorbis moquini
- Planorbis planorbis
- Thicklip ramshorn (Planorbula armigera)
- Polypylis hemisphaerula
- Polypylis likharevi
- Polypylis sibirica
- Segmentina calatha
- Segmentina distinguenda
- Segmentina molytes
- Segmentina trochoidea
- Segmentorbis angustus
- Segmentorbis kanisaensis
- Uncancylus concentricus
- Artemesian rams-horn (Vorticifex effusa)

==== Lymnaeids ====
- Bubble pondsnail (Austropeplea lessoni)
- Austropeplea tomentosa
- Mammoth lymnaea (Bulimnaea megasoma)
- Prairie fossaria (Galba bulimoides)
- Carib fossaria (Galba cubensis)
- Dusky fossaria (Galba dalli)
- Graceful fossaria (Galba exigua)
- Galba peninsulae
- Galba pervia
- Attenuate fossaria (Galba truncatula)
- Lymnaea acuminata
- Lymnaea andersoniana
- Lymnaea bactriana
- Lymnaea diaphana
- Lymnaea hookeri
- Lymnaea luteola
- Lymnaea obliquata
- Lymnaea persica
- Lymnaea pictonica
- Lymnaea rectilabrum
- Lymnaea saridalensis
- Lymnaea schirazensis
- Great pond snail (Lymnaea stagnalis)
- Lymnaea tenera
- Lymnaea tumida
- Lymnaea ulaganica
- Mimic lymnaea (Pseudosuccinea columella)
- Radix auricularia
- Radix balthica
- Radix brevicauda
- Radix natalensis
- Radix relicta
- Radix swinhoei
- Radix viridis
- Woodland pondsnail (Stagnicola catascopium)
- Stagnicola corvus
- Marsh pondsnail (Stagnicola elodes)
- Flat-whorled pondsnail (Stagnicola exilis)
- Stagnicola fuscus
- Mountain marshsnail (Stagnicola montanensis)
- Stagnicola palustris
- Widelip pondsnail (Stagnicola traski)
- Stagnicola turricula

==== Chilinids ====
- Chilina aurantia
- Chilina fulgurata
- Chilina patagonica
- Chilina rushii

==== Latiids ====
- Latia neritoides

=== Neogastropoda ===
==== Conids ====
- Conus abbas
- Conus abbreviatus
- Conus achatinus
- Conus acutangulus
- Conus acutimarginatus
- Conus adamsonii
- Conus aemulus
- Conus africanus
- Conus alconnelli
- Conus algoensis
- Conus alisi
- Conus amadis
- Doubtful cone (Conus ambiguus)
- Conus ammiralis
- Amphiurgus cone (Conus amphiurgus)
- Conus anabelae
- Conus anaglypticus
- Conus andremenezi
- Conus anemone
- Conus angasi
- Conus antoniomonteiroi
- Conus aphrodite
- Conus aplustre
- Conus araneosus
- Conus arangoi
- Conus archetypus
- Conus archon
- Conus arcuatus
- Sand-dusted cone (Conus arenatus)
- Conus armadillo
- Mace cone (Conus armiger)
- Conus articulatus
- Conus artoptus
- Conus asiaticus
- Slender cone (Conus attenuatus)
- Conus augur
- Conus aulicus
- Conus aureopunctatus
- Conus aureus
- Conus auricomus
- Conus aurisiacus
- Conus australis
- Conus axelrodi
- Conus babaensis
- Conus baccatus
- Baer's cone (Conus baeri)
- Bahama cone (Conus bahamensis)
- Conus baileyi
- Conus bairstowi
- Conus bajanensis
- Conus balteatus
- Conus bandanus
- Conus barbieri
- Conus barthelemyi
- Conus bartschi
- Conus bayani
- Conus bayeri
- Bengal cone (Conus bengalensis)
- Conus berdulinus
- Conus bessei
- Conus betulinus
- Conus biliosus
- Conus binghamae
- Conus biraghii
- Conus boavistensis
- Conus boeticus
- Conus boholensis
- Conus borgesi
- Conus boucheti
- Conus boui
- Conus bozzettii
- Branhams cone (Conus branhamae)
- Brian Haye's cone (Conus brianhayesi)
- Conus brunneofilaris
- Conus brunneus
- Conus bruuni
- Conus bulbus
- Bubble cone (Conus bullatus)
- Conus caillaudi
- Conus cakobaui
- Conus calhetae
- Conus californicus
- Cancellate cone (Conus cancellatus)
- Conus canonicus
- Conus capitanellus
- Conus capitaneus
- Characteristic cone (Conus caracteristicus)
- Conus carnalis
- Conus catus
- Conus caysalensis
- Matchless cone (Conus cedonulli)
- Centurion cone (Conus centurio)
- Conus ceruttii
- Conus cervus
- Conus chaldaeus
- Conus chiangi
- Conus chytreus
- Conus cinereus
- Conus cingulatus
- Conus circumactus
- Conus circumcisus
- Conus clarus
- Conus claudiae
- Clery's cone (Conus clerii)
- Conus cocceus
- Conus coccineus
- Conus coelinae
- Conus coffeae
- Stigmatic cone (Conus collisus)
- Conus comatosa
- Conus consors
- Conus corallinus
- Conus cordigera
- Conus coromandelicus
- Conus coronatus
- Conus crioulus
- Conus crocatus
- Cuming's cone (Conus cumingii)
- Conus cyanostoma
- Cylindrical cone (Conus cylindraceus)
- Conus dalli
- Conus damottai
- Conus dampierensis
- Conus darkini
- Conus daucus
- Conus dayriti
- Conus delanoyae
- Sozon's cone (Conus delessertii)
- Conus delucai
- Conus desidiosus
- Conus deynzerorum
- Conus diadema
- Conus dictator
- Conus dispar
- Conus distans
- Conus dondani
- Conus dorreensis
- Conus dusaveli
- Conus ebraeus
- Conus eburneus
- Conus echo
- Conus elegans
- False Virgin cone (Conus emaciatus)
- Conasprella emarginata (Conus emarginatus)
- Conus emersoni
- Conus empressae
- Conus encaustus
- Conus episcopatus
- Agate cone (Conus ermineus)
- Red sea cone (Conus erythraeensis)
- Conus eucoronatus
- Conus eugrammatus
- Conus eversoni
- Conus excelsus
- Conus exiguus
- Conus eximius
- Conus exquisitus
- Conus fantasmalis
- Conus fergusoni
- Conus ferrugineus
- Conus figulinus
- Conus fijiensis
- Conus fijisulcatus
- Conus filmeri
- Conus fischoederi
- Flame coloured cone (Conus flammeacolor)
- Flame cone (Conus flavescens)
- Yellow Pacific cone (Conus flavidus)
- Conus flavus
- Conus flavusalbus
- Snow-flaked cone (Conus floccatus)
- Conus floridulus
- Conus franciscoi
- Frigid cone (Conus frigidus)
- Conus fulmen
- Smoky cone (Conus fumigatus)
- Conus furnae
- Conus furvus
- Conus fuscoflavus
- Conus gabelishi
- Conus gabrielae
- Garcia's cone (Conus garciai)
- Conus generalis
- Conus genuanus
- Conus geographus
- Conus gigasulcatus
- Conus gilvus
- Conus gladiator
- Conus glans
- Conus glaucus
- Conus glenni
- Conus gloriamaris
- Conus gondwanensis
- Conus gradatulus
- Conus grahami
- Granger's cone (Conus grangeri)
- Glory-of-the-atlantic cone (Conus granulatus)
- Conus granum
- Conus guanche
- Conus gubernator
- Conus guidopoppei
- Conus harlandi
- Havana cone (Conus havanensis)
- Conus helgae
- Conus hirasei
- Conus hivanus
- Conus hopwoodi
- Conus howelli
- Hyena cone (Conus hyaena)
- Conus ichinoseana
- Conus imperialis
- Conus inconstans
- Conus infinitus
- Conus infrenatus
- Engraved cone (Conus inscriptus)
- Conus insculptus
- Conus iodostoma
- Conus ione
- Conus irregularis
- Conus isabelarum
- Conus janus
- Jasper cone (Conus jaspideus)
- Jickeli's cone (Conus jickelii)
- Abbott's cone (Conus jucundus)
- Conus judaeus
- Conus julieandreae
- Conus kalafuti
- Conus kanakinus
- Conus kevani
- Conus kimioi
- Conus kinoshitai
- Conus kintoki
- Conus klemae
- Conus korni
- Conus kremerorum
- Kulkulcan cone (Conus kulkulcan)
- Conus kuroharai
- Conus lamberti
- Conus lani
- Conus largillierti
- Conus laterculatus
- Conus legatus
- Conus lemniscatus
- Conus lenavati
- Conus leobrerai
- Conus leopardus
- Conus lienardi
- Conus limpusi
- Conus lindae
- Conus lischkeanus
- Conus litoglyphus
- Conus litteratus
- Conus lividus
- Conus lizardensis
- Conus lizarum
- Conus locumtenens
- Conus longilineus
- Conus longurionis
- Conus loroisii
- Conus loyaltiensis
- Conus luciae
- Conus lucidus
- Conus lynceus
- Conus madagascariensis
- Conus magellanicus
- Conus magnificus
- Conus magnottei
- Conus magus
- Conus mahogani
- Conus maioensis
- Malacca cone (Conus malacanus)
- Maldive cone (Conus maldivus)
- Conus mappa
- Conus marchionatus
- Marbled cone (Conus marmoreus)
- Maze's cone (Conus mazei)
- Conus mcgintyi
- Conus medoci
- Conus melissae
- Conus memiae
- Conus messiasi
- Conus micropunctatus
- Conus miles
- Conus miliaris
- Conus milneedwardsi
- Bermuda cone (Conus mindanus)
- Conus minnamurra
- Conus miruchae
- Conus mitratus
- Conus moluccensis
- Supreme cone (Conus monachus)
- Necklace cone (Conus monile)
- Conus moreleti
- Conus mozambicus
- Conus mucronatus
- Conus muriculatus
- Mouse cone (Conus mus)
- Conus musicus
- Conus mustelinus
- Conus namocanus
- Conus naranjus
- Conus natalis
- Conus neoguttatus
- Neptune cone (Conus neptunus)
- Black spot cone (Conus nigropunctatus)
- Conus nimbosus
- Noble cone (Conus nobilis)
- Conus nodiferus
- Conus norai
- Conus nucleus
- Conus nussatella
- Conus nux
- Conus obscurus
- Conus ochroleucus
- Conus oishii
- Conus omaria
- Conus orbignyi
- Conus orion
- Conus otohimeae
- Conus pacei
- Conus pagodus
- Conus papilliferus
- Conus papuensis
- Conus parascalaris
- Conus parius
- Conus parvatus
- Conus paschalli
- Pat's cone (Conus patae)
- Conus patricius
- Paula's cone (Conus paulae)
- Conus pealii
- Conus penchaszadehi
- Feathered cone (Conus pennaceus)
- Conus pergrandis
- Conus perplexus
- Conus pertusus
- Conus philippii
- Conus phuketensis
- Conus pica
- Conus pictus
- Conus pineaui
- Conus planorbis
- Conus plinthis
- Conus polongimarumai
- Conus poormani
- Conus portobeloensis
- Conus poulosi
- Conus praecellens
- Conus primus
- Conus princeps
- Conus profundorum
- Conus proximus
- False golden cone (Conus pseudoaurantius)
- Conus pseudocardinalis
- Conus pseudocuneolus
- Conus pseudonivifer
- Conus pulcher
- Flea cone (Conus pulicarius)
- Pinpoint cone (Conus puncticulatus)
- Conus purpurascens
- Conus pusio
- Conus quercinus
- Conus rachelae
- Conus radiatus
- Conus rainesae
- Conus ranonganus
- Conus raoulensis
- Conus rattus
- Conus raulsilvai
- Conus recluzianus
- Conus reductaspiralis
- Crown cone (Conus regius)
- Conus regularis
- Conus retifer
- Conus roberti
- Conus roeckeli
- Conus rolani
- Conus rosalindensis
- Rosemary's cone (Conus rosemaryae)
- Conus roseorapum
- Conus rufimaculosus
- Conus rutilus
- Conus saecularis
- Conus sagei
- Conus sahlbergi
- Conus sanderi
- Conus sanguinolentus
- Conus sazanka
- Conus scalaris
- Conus schirrmeisteri
- Conus scopulorum
- Conus sculletti
- Conus selenae
- Conus sennottorum
- Conus serranegrae
- Conus sertacinctus
- Conus shikamai
- Conus sieboldii
- Conus solangeae
- Conus speciosissimus
- Conus spectrum
- Conus sphacelatus
- Conus spirofilis
- Sponsal cone (Conus sponsalis)
- West Indian alphabet cone (Conus spurius)
- Conus stercusmuscarum
- Conus stimpsoni
- Conus stocki
- Conus stramineus
- Conus striatellus
- Conus striatus
- Conus striolatus
- Conus stupa
- Conus stupella
- Conus suduirauti
- Conus sugimotonis
- Conus sukhadwalai
- Conus sulcatus
- Conus sulcocastaneus
- Conus sunderlandi
- Conus suratensis
- Conus sutanorcum
- Sutured cone (Conus suturatus)
- Conus tabidus
- Ringed cone (Conus taeniatus)
- Conus telatus
- Conus tenuilineatus
- Conus tenuistriatus
- Conus teramachii
- Conus terebra
- Conus tessulatus
- Conus textile
- Conus thalassiarchus
- Conus thomae
- Conus tiaratus
- Conus tiki
- Conus timorensis
- Conus tinianus
- Conus tisii
- Conus tornatus
- Conus traillii
- Conus traversianus
- Conus tribblei
- Sting ray cone (Conus trigonus)
- Conus trovaoi
- Conus tulipa
- Conus tuticorinensis
- Conus typhon
- Conus variegatus
- Conus varius
- Conus velaensis
- Conus venezuelanus
- Conus ventricosus
- Conus venulatus
- Conus verdensis
- Conus vexillum
- Conus victoriae
- Vic Wee's cone (Conus vicweei)
- Villepin's cone (Conus villepinii)
- Conus vimineus
- Conus viola
- Conus violaceus
- Conus virgatus
- Conus virgo
- Conus visagenus
- Conus vittatus
- Conus voluminalis
- Conus vulcanus
- Conus wakayamaensis
- Conus wittigi
- Conus worki
- Conus xanthicus
- Conus ximenes
- Conus zandbergeni
- Conus zapatosensis
- Conus zeylanicus
- Conus zonatus
- Conus zylmanae

=== Eupulmonata ===
- Auriculastra elongata
- Auriculastra radiolata
- Auriculastra subula
- Cat's ear cassidula (Cassidula aurisfelis)
- Cassidula crassiuscula
- Cassidula labrella
- Cassidula multiplicata
- Cylindrotis quadrasi
- Judas ear cassidula (Ellobium aurisjudae)
- Midas ear cassidula (Ellobium aurismidae)
- Laemodonta bella
- Laemodonta punctigera
- Laemodonta striata
- Leucophytia bidentata
- Melampus caffer
- Coffee melampus (Melampus coffeus)
- Melampus semiaratus
- Melampus sincaporensis
- Melampus striatus
- Melampus sulculosus
- Mouse ear snail (Myosotella denticulata)
- Ophicardelus sulcatus
- Pleuroloba quoyi

=== Other gastropod species ===
- Amphibola crenata
- Astraea heliotropium
- Filicaulis seychellensis
- Salinator solida

== Bivalvia ==
There are 296 species and two subspecies in the class Bivalvia assessed as least concern.

=== Unionida ===
There are 193 species and one subspecies in the order Unionoida assessed as least concern.

==== Etheriids ====
- Bartlettia stefanensis
- Etheria elliptica

==== Unionids ====
- Mucket (Actinonaias ligamentina)
- Acuticosta chinensis
- Acuticosta ovata
- Triangle floater (Alasmidonta undulata)
- Slippershell mussel (Alasmidonta viridis)
- Coosa fiveridge (Amblema elliottii)
- Threeridge (Amblema plicata)
- Wartyback (Amphinaias nodulata)
- Pimpleback (Amphinaias pustulosa)
- Anemina arcaeformis
- Anemina fluminea
- Duck mussel (Anodonta anatina)
- Yukon floater (Anodonta beringiana)
- California floater (Anodonta californiensis)
- Swan mussel (Anodonta cygnea)
- Alewife floater (Anodonta implicata)
- Rock pocketbook (Arcidens confragosus)
- Arconaia lanceolata
- Coelatura aegyptiaca
- Coelatura briarti
- Coelatura gabonensis
- Coelatura hauttecoeuri
- Coelatura horei
- Coelatura kunenensis
- Coelatura leopoldvillensis
- Coelatura luapulaensis
- Coelatura mossambicensis
- Cristaria tenuis
- Cuneopsis capitatus
- Cuneopsis celtiformis
- Cuneopsis heudei
- Cuneopsis pisciculus
- Carolina lance (Elliptio angustata)
- Florida shiny spike (Elliptio buckleyi)
- Box spike (Elliptio cistellaeformis)
- Eastern elliptio (Elliptio complanata)
- Elephantear mussel (Elliptio crassidens)
- Spike (Elliptio dilatata)
- Satilla elephantear (Elliptio downiei)
- Oval elliptio (Elliptio errans)
- Northern lance (Elliptio fisheriana)
- Pod lance (Elliptio folliculata)
- Altamaha slabshell (Elliptio hopetonensis)
- Flat spike (Elliptio jayensis)
- Atlantic spike (Elliptio producta)
- Waccamaw spike (Elliptio waccamawensis)
- Ensidens ingallsianus
- Ebonyshell (Fusconaia ebena)
- Wabash pigtoe (Fusconaia flava)
- Ozark pigtoe (Fusconaia ozarkensis)
- Grandidieria burtoni
- Hyriopsis bialata
- Triangle sail mussel (Hyriopsis cumingii)
- Hyriopsis delaportei
- Lamellidens consobrinus
- Lamellidens corrianus
- Lamellidens generosus
- Lamellidens jenkinsianus
- Lamellidens lamellatus
- Lamellidens marginalis
- Lamellidens narainpirensis
- Lamellidens phenchooganjensis
- Lamprotula caveata
- Lamprotula fibrosa
- Lamprotula leai
- Wavyrayed lampmussel (Lampsilis fasciola)
- Louisiana fatmucket (Lampsilis hydiana)
- Southern pocketbook (Lampsilis ornata)
- Fatmucket (Lampsilis siliquoidea)
- Rayed pink fatmucket (Lampsilis splendida)
- Yellow sandshell (Lampsilis teres)
- Lanceolaria gladiola
- Lanceolaria grayana
- Lasmigona compressa
- Tennessee heelsplitter (Lasmigona holstonia)
- Green floater (Lasmigona subviridis)
- Black sandshell (Ligumia recta)
- Washboard (Megalonaias nervosa)
- Nitia acuminata
- Nitia monceti
- Nitia teretiuscula
- Nodularia dorri
- Nyassunio nyassaensis
- Hickorynut (Obovaria olivaria)
- Oxynaia pugio
- Parreysia andersoniana
- Parreysia bonneaudi
- Parreysia burmana
- Parreysia caerulea
- Parreysia corrugata
- Parreysia favidens
- Parreysia gowhattensis
- Parreysia involuta
- Parreysia lima
- Parreysia mandelayensis
- Parreysia occata
- Parreysia olivaria
- Parreysia pachysoma
- Parreysia rajahensis
- Parreysia shurtleffiana
- Parreysia sikkimensis
- Parreysia smaragdites
- Parreysia substriata
- Parreysia tavoyensis
- Parreysia theobaldi
- Parreysia triembolus
- Physunio cambodiensis
- Physunio eximius
- Physunio inornatus
- Physunio micropterus
- Physunio modelli
- Physunio superbus
- Pilsbryoconcha exilis
- Pilsbryoconcha lemeslei
- Bankclimber (Plectomerus dombeyanus)
- Mississippi pigtoe (Pleurobema beadleianum)
- Round pigtoe (Pleurobema sintoxia)
- Tennessee pigtoe (Pleuronaia barnesiana)
- Potamilus alatus
- Pink papershell (Potamilus ohiensis)
- Pseudodon inoscularis
- Pseudodon mouhotii
- Pseudodon vondembuschianus
- Pseudospatha tanganyicensis
- Ptychobranchus fasciolaris
- Eastern floater (Pyganodon cataracta)
- Newfoundland floater (Pyganodon fragilis)
- Giant floater (Pyganodon grandis)
- Pyganodon lacustris
- Quadrula quadrula
- Ridged mapleleaf (Quadrula rumphiana)
- Purple pigtoe (Quadrula succissa)
- Radiatula pilata
- Scabies crispata
- Scabies phaselus
- Schistodesmus lampreyanus
- Schistodesmus spinosus
- Chinese pond mussel (Sinanodonta woodiana)
- Solenaia soleniformis
- Purple lilliput (Toxolasma lividum)
- Lilliput (Toxolasma parvum)
- Trapezoideus exolescens
- Fawnsfoot (Truncilla donaciformis)
- Uniandra contradens
- Unio caffer
- Unio douglasiae
- Painter's mussel (Unio pictorum)
- Unio tigridis
- Swollen river mussel (Unio tumidus)
- Florida pondhorn (Uniomerus caroliniana)
- Pondhorn (Uniomerus tetralasmus)
- Unionetta fabagina
- Paper pondshell (Utterbackia imbecillis)
- Ellipse (Venustaconcha ellipsiformis)
- Florida rainbow (Villosa amygdala)
- Notched rainbow (Villosa constricta)
- Eastern creekshell (Villosa delumbis)
- Painted creekshell (Villosa taeniata)
- Downy rainbow (Villosa villosa)

==== Hyriids ====
- Castalia ambigua
- Castalia ecarinata
- Australian river mussel (Cucumerunio novaehollandiae)
- Diplodon chilensis
- Diplodon granosus
- Diplodon parallelopipedon
- New Zealand freshwater mussel (Echyridella menziesii)
- Echyridella onekaka
- Prisodon syrmatophorus

==== Iridinids ====
Species

- Aspatharia chaiziana
- Aspatharia dahomeyensis
- Aspatharia pfeifferiana
- Aspatharia rugifera
- Aspatharia semicorrugata
- Chambardia dautzenbergi
- Chambardia petersii
- Chambardia rubens
- Chambardia wahlbergi
- Chambardia wissmanni
- Chelidonopsis hirundo
- Mutela dubia
- Mutela hargeri
- Mutela joubini
- Mutela mabilli
- Mutela rostrata
- Mutela zambesiensis
- Pleiodon spekii

Subspecies

- Chambardia wahlbergi hartmanni

==== Mycetopodids ====
- Anodontites colombiensis
- Anodontites tenebricosus
- Diplodontites cookei
- Diplodontites pilsbryana
- Lamproscapha ensiformis

=== Cardiida ===
- Boring clam (Tridacna crocea)

=== Arcida ===
- Scaphula celox
- Scaphula deltae
- Scaphula pinna

=== Venerida ===
There are 96 species and one subspecies in the order Veneroida assessed as least concern.

==== Dreissenids ====
- Quagga mussel (Dreissena bugensis)
- Zebra mussel (Dreissena polymorpha)
- Dreissena rostriformis
- Mytilopsis africanus
- Dark false mussel (Mytilopsis leucophaeata)

==== Sphaeriids ====
- Eupera cubensis
- Eupera ovata
- Eupera sturanyi
- Musculium argentinum
- Musculium compressum
- Musculium hartmanni
- Musculium incomitatum
- Musculium lacustre
- Musculium novaezelandiae
- Long fingernail clam (Musculium transversum)
- Pisidium annandalei
- Pisidium atkinsonianum
- Caserta pea mussel (Pisidium casertanum)
- Pisidium chilense
- Pisidium chiquitanum
- Pisidium clarkeanum
- Arctic-alpine pea clam (Pisidium conventus)
- Pisidium costulosum
- Pisidium dorbignyi
- Pisidium ellisi
- Round peaclam (Pisidium equilaterale)
- Etheridge's pea shell (Pisidium etheridgii)
- Rusty peaclam (Pisidium ferrugineum)
- Henslow's pea mussel (Pisidium henslowanum)
- Pisidium hodgkini
- Giant northern peaclam (Pisidium idahoense)
- Pisidium insigne
- Pisidium iquito
- Pisidium javanum
- Pisidium langleyanum
- Pisidium meierbrooki
- Pisidium nevillianum
- Pisidium novaezelandiae
- Porous pea mussel (Pisidium obtusale)
- Pisidium omaguaca
- Pisidium pirothi
- Pisidium ponderi
- Pisidium prasongi
- Pisidium pseudosphaerium
- Pisidium subtilestriatum
- Pisidium sumatranum
- Pisidium supinum
- Pisidium variabile
- Globular peaclam (Pisidium ventricosum)
- Pisidium vile
- Walden peaclam (Pisidium waldeni)
- Walker peaclam (Pisidium walkeri)
- Sphaerium asiaticum
- Sphaerium baicalense
- Sphaerium bequaerti
- Sphaerium corneum
- Sphaerium forbesi
- Sphaerium incomitatum
- Sphaerium indicum
- Sphaerium lauricochae
- Sphaerium nyanzae
- Sphaerium ovale
- Tanysiphon rivalis

==== Cyrenids ====
Species

- Corbicula assamensis
- Corbicula astartina
- Corbicula bensoni
- Corbicula blandiana
- Corbicula fluminalis
- Golden freshwater clam (Corbicula fluminea)
- Corbicula iravadica
- Corbicula leana
- Corbicula moreletiana
- Corbicula noetlingi
- Corbicula regularis
- Corbicula striatella
- Bengali geloina (Polymesoda bengalensis)
- Marsh clam (Polymesoda expansa)
- Villorita cornucopia
- Black clam (Villorita cyprinoides)

Subspecies

- Corbicula fluminalis natalensis

==== Donacids ====
- Egeria bernardii
- Egeria cailliaudi
- Egeria concamerata
- Egeria congica
- Egeria heukelomii
- Egeria nux
- Egeria paradoxa
- Egeria radiata
- Iphigenia curta
- Iphigenia delessertii
- Iphigenia laevigata
- Iphigenia messageri

==== Other Venerida species ====
- Cyrenoida dupontia
- Cyrenoida rhodopyga
- Neosolen aquaedulcioris
- Novaculina gangetica
- Pharella waltoni

=== Mytilida ===
- Brachidontes arcuatulus
- Golden mussel (Limnoperna fortunei)
- Sinomytilus harmandi

== Cephalopods ==
There are 197 cephalopod species assessed as least concern.

=== Octopuses ===
- Telescope octopus (Amphitretus pelagicus)
- Amphitretus thielei
- Argonauta argo
- Argonauta boettgeri
- Argonauta hians
- Argonauta nodosa
- Argonauta nouryi
- Bolitaena pygmaea
- Cirroctopus antarctica
- Cirroctopus glacialis
- Cirroctopus mawsoni
- Cirroteuthis muelleri
- Grimpoteuthis bathynectes
- Grimpoteuthis boylei
- Grimpoteuthis challengeri
- Grimpoteuthis discoveryi
- Seven-arm octopus (Haliphron atlanticus)
- Japetella diaphana
- Ocythoe tuberculata
- Gelatinous blanket octopus (Tremoctopus gelatus)
- Palmate octopus (Tremoctopus gracilis)
- Tremoctopus robsoni
- Common blanket octopus (Tremoctopus violaceus)
- Vitreledonella richardi

=== Sepioloida ===
There are 45 species in Sepioloida assessed as least concern.

==== Sepiids ====
- Southern cuttlefish (Sepia australis)
- Sepia bidhaia
- Slender cuttlefish (Sepia braggi)
- Sepia chirotrema
- Sepia cottoni
- Knifebone cuttlefish (Sepia cultrata)
- Sepia erostrata
- Sepia filibrachia
- Sepia grahami
- Hedley's cuttlefish (Sepia hedleyi)
- Sepia irvingi
- Sepia koilados
- Sepia limata
- Sepia mestus
- Sepia mira
- Sepia novaehollandiae
- Common cuttlefish (Sepia officinalis)
- Oman cuttlefish (Sepia omani)
- Magnificent cuttlefish (Sepia opipara)
- Papuan cuttlefish (Sepia papuensis)
- Sepia plana
- Striking cuttlefish (Sepia plangon)
- Hooded cuttlefish (Sepia prashadi)
- Sepia rhoda
- Sepia senta
- Smith's cuttlefish (Sepia smithi)
- Grooved cuttlefish (Sepia sulcata)
- Trident cuttlefish (Sepia trygonina)
- Sepia typica
- Sepia vercoi
- Sepiella mangkangunga

==== Sepiolids ====
- Antilles bobtail squid (Austrorossia antillensis)
- Big bottom bobtail squid (Austrorossia australis)
- Austrorossia mastigophora
- Inioteuthis maculosa
- Carol bobtail squid (Neorossia caroli)
- Rossia megaptera
- Rossia moelleri
- Rossia palpebrosa
- Semirossia patagonica
- Lesser shining bobtail squid (Semirossia tenera)
- Sepiola aurantiaca
- Spotty bobtail squid (Sepiola parva)

==== Sepiadariids ====
- Koch's bottletail squid (Sepiadarium kochi)
- Sepioloidea magna

=== Oegopsina species ===
There are 126 Oegopsina species assessed as least concern.

==== Enoploteuthids ====
- Abralia andamanica
- Abralia astrosticta
- Abralia redfieldi
- Abralia similis
- Abralia steindachneri
- Abralia trigonura
- Abralia veranyi
- Abraliopsis affinis
- Abraliopsis falco
- Abraliopsis felis
- Abraliopsis gilchristi
- Abraliopsis lineata
- Abraliopsis morisi
- Abraliopsis pacificus
- Enoploteuthis anapsis
- Enoploteuthis higginsi
- Enoploteuthis jonesi
- Enoploteuthis leptura
- Enoploteuthis obliqua
- Enoploteuthis reticulata
- Japanese firefly squid (Watasenia scintillans)

==== Hooked squids ====
- Ancistroteuthis lichtensteini
- Filippovia knipovitchi
- Kondakovia longimana
- Greater hooked squid (Onykia ingens)
- Onykia loennbergii
- Onykia robsoni

==== Chiroteuthids ====
- Asperoteuthis acanthoderma
- Chiroteuthis calyx
- Chiroteuthis joubini
- Chiroteuthis mega
- Chiroteuthis picteti
- Chiroteuthis spoeli
- Chiroteuthis veranyi
- Grimalditeuthis bonplandi
- Planctoteuthis danae

==== Cranchiids ====
- Bathothauma lyromma
- Cranchia scabra
- Egea inermis
- Galiteuthis armata
- Galiteuthis glacialis
- Galiteuthis pacifica
- Galiteuthis phyllura
- Leachia danae
- Liocranchia reinhardti
- Liocranchia valdiviae
- Colossal squid (Mesonychoteuthis hamiltoni)
- Taonius belone
- Taonius borealis
- Taonius pavo
- Teuthowenia megalops
- Teuthowenia pellucida

==== Gonatids ====
- Minimal armhook squid (Berryteuthis anonychus)
- Berryteuthis magister
- Gonatopsis borealis
- Gonatopsis makko
- Gonatopsis octopedatus
- Gonatus antarcticus
- Gonatus berryi
- Gonatus californiensis
- Gonatus fabricii
- Gonatus kamtschaticus
- Gonatus madokai
- Gonatus onyx
- Gonatus pyros
- Gonatus steenstrupi

==== Ommastrephids ====
- Eucleoteuthis luminosa
- Hyaloteuthis pelagica
- Argentine squid (Illex argentinus)
- Illex coindetii
- Illex illecebrosus
- Illex oxygonius
- Black squid (Martialia hyadesi)
- Nototodarus gouldi
- Nototodarus hawaiiensis
- Nototodarus sloanii
- Neon flying squid (Ommastrephes bartramii)
- Ornithoteuthis antillarum
- Ornithoteuthis volatilis
- Sthenoteuthis oualaniensis
- Sthenoteuthis pteropus
- Todarodes angolensis
- Todarodes filippovae
- Japanese flying squid (Todarodes pacificus)
- Todarodes sagittatus
- Todaropsis eblanae

==== Histioteuthids ====
- Histioteuthis atlantica
- Histioteuthis bonnellii
- Histioteuthis cerasina
- Histioteuthis corona
- Histioteuthis eltaninae
- Histioteuthis heteropsis
- Histioteuthis macrohista
- Histioteuthis meleagroteuthis
- Histioteuthis miranda
- Histioteuthis oceani
- Histioteuthis reversa
- Stigmatoteuthis arcturi
- Stigmatoteuthis dofleini
- Stigmatoteuthis hoylei

==== Pyroteuthids ====
- Pterygioteuthis gemmata
- Pterygioteuthis giardi
- Pterygioteuthis microlampas
- Pyroteuthis addolux
- Pyroteuthis margaritifera

==== Other Oegopsina species ====
- Antarctic neosquid (Alluroteuthis antarctica)
- Ancistrocheirus lesueuri
- Architeuthis dux
- Bush-club squid (Batoteuthis skolops)
- Brachioteuthis beanii
- Brachioteuthis picta
- Cycloteuthis serventyi
- Discoteuthis discus
- Discoteuthis laciniosa
- Joubiniteuthis portieri
- Lampadioteuthis megaleia
- Lepidoteuthis grimaldii
- Lycoteuthis lorigera
- Neoteuthis thielei
- Pholidoteuthis adami
- Pholidoteuthis massyae
- Psychroteuthis glacialis
- Moon squid (Selenoteuthis scintillans)
- Slosarczykovia circumantarctica
- Taningia danae
- Diamondback squid (Thysanoteuthis rhombus)

=== Bathyteuthida ===
- Deepsea squid (Bathyteuthis abyssicola)

=== Spirulida ===
- Ram's horn squid (Spirula spirula)

== See also ==
- Lists of IUCN Red List least concern species
- List of near threatened molluscs
- List of vulnerable molluscs
- List of endangered molluscs
- List of critically endangered molluscs
- List of recently extinct molluscs
- List of data deficient molluscs
