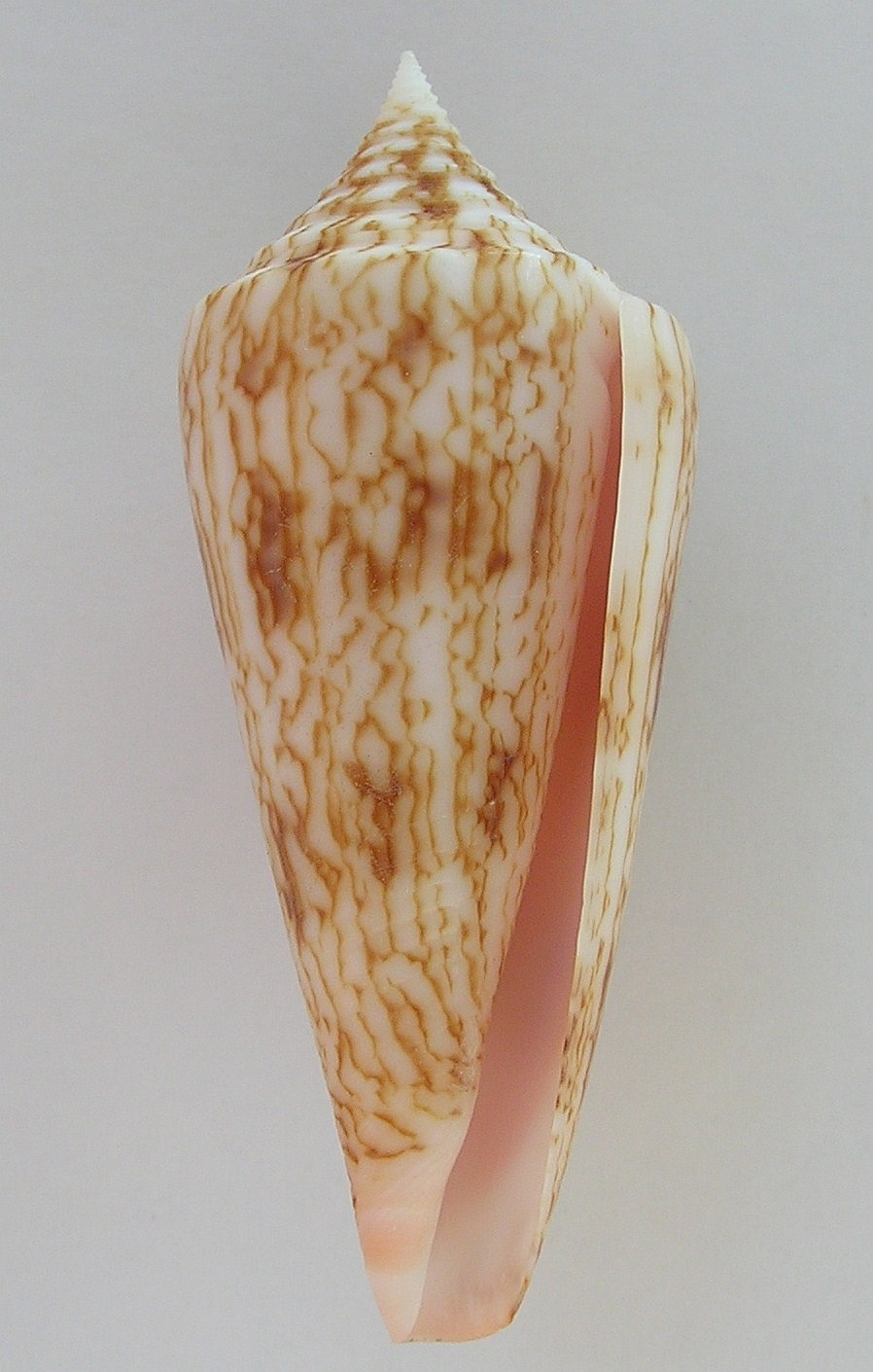
- Apertural view of Conus neptunus

Conservation status
- Least Concern (IUCN 3.1)

Scientific classification
- Kingdom: Animalia
- Phylum: Mollusca
- Class: Gastropoda
- Subclass: Caenogastropoda
- Order: Neogastropoda
- Superfamily: Conoidea
- Family: Conidae
- Genus: Conus
- Species: C. neptunus

Binomial name
- Conus neptunus Reeve, 1843

Synonyms
- Asprella neptunus (Reeve, 1843); Conus colorovariegatus Kosuge, 1981; Conus neptunoides E. A. Smith, 1880; Conus neptunus futunaensis Moolenbeek & Röckel, 1996; Conus (Phasmoconus) neptunus Reeve, 1843 · accepted, alternate representation; Darioconus neptunoides Smith, E.A., 1880; Graphiconus neptunus (Reeve, 1843)

= Conus neptunus =

Species of sea snail

Conus neptunus, common name the Neptune cone, is a species of sea snail, a marine gastropod mollusk in the family Conidae, the cone snails and their allies.

Like all species within the genus Conus, these snails are predatory and venomous. They are capable of stinging humans, therefore live ones should be handled carefully or not at all.

== Description ==
The size of an adult shell varies between 43 mm and 80 mm. The solid shell is narrow, with a concavely elevated spire and a sharp apex. The body whorl is distantly grooved towards the base. The shell has a flesh color, everywhere veined and clouded with reddish chestnut flexuous lines and spots. The aperture is rosy white.

== Distribution ==
This species occurs off the Philippines, Australia and in the Southwest Pacific Ocean.

== Gallery ==
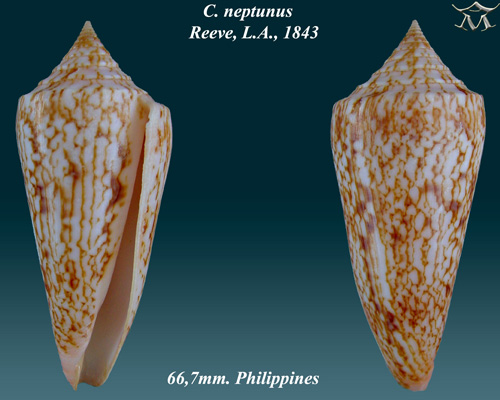
Conus neptunus Reeve, L.A., 1843

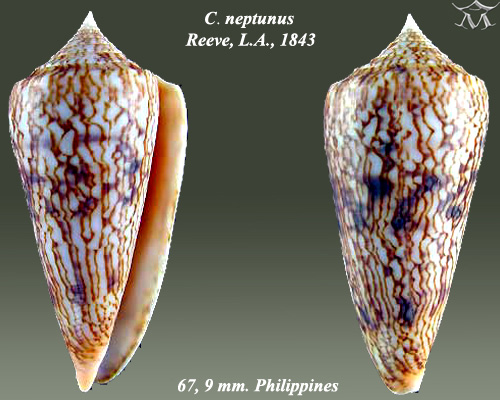
Conus neptunus Reeve, L.A., 1843
