= Conus gigasulcatus =

Conservation status
- Least Concern (IUCN 3.1)

Scientific classification
- Kingdom: Animalia
- Phylum: Mollusca
- Class: Gastropoda
- Subclass: Caenogastropoda
- Order: Neogastropoda
- Superfamily: Conoidea
- Family: Conidae
- Genus: Conus
- Species: C. gigasulcatus

Binomial name
- Conus gigasulcatus Moolenbeek, Röckel & Bouchet, 2008

Synonyms
- Asprella gigasulcata (Moolenbeek, Röckel & Bouchet, 2008); Conus (Asprella) gigasulcatus Moolenbeek, Röckel & Bouchet, 2008 · accepted, alternate representation

Species of sea snail

Conus gigasulcatus is a species of sea snail, a marine gastropod mollusk in the family Conidae, the cone snails and their allies.

Like all species within the genus Conus, these snails are predatory and venomous. They are capable of stinging humans, therefore live ones should be handled carefully or not at all.

== Description ==
The length of an adult shell varies between 28 mm and 90 mm.

== Distribution ==
This species occurs in the Pacific Ocean off Fiji and Vanuatu
