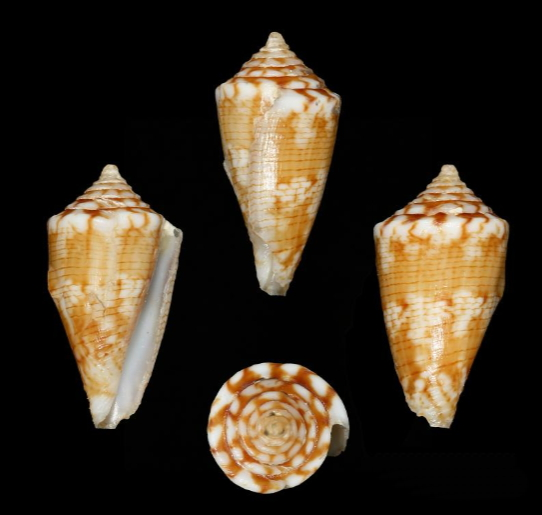
- Shell and protoconch of Conus brunneofilaris (holotype at the Smithsonian Institution)

Conservation status
- Least Concern (IUCN 3.1)

Scientific classification
- Kingdom: Animalia
- Phylum: Mollusca
- Class: Gastropoda
- Subclass: Caenogastropoda
- Order: Neogastropoda
- Superfamily: Conoidea
- Family: Conidae
- Genus: Conus
- Species: C. brunneofilaris

Binomial name
- Conus brunneofilaris Petuch, 1990

Synonyms
- Cariboconus brunneofilaris (Petuch, 1990); Conus (Dauciconus) brunneofilaris Petuch, 1990 · accepted, alternate representation; Gradiconus brunneofilaris (Petuch, 1990)

= Conus brunneofilaris =

Species of sea snail

Conus brunneofilaris is a species of sea snail, a marine gastropod mollusk in the family Conidae, the cone snails and their allies.

Like all species within the genus Conus, these snails are predatory and venomous. They are capable of stinging humans, therefore live ones should be handled carefully or not at all.

== Distribution ==
This species occurs in the Caribbean Sea off Panama

== Description ==
The maximum recorded shell length is 14 mm.

== Habitat ==
Minimum recorded depth is 65 m. Maximum recorded depth is 65 m.
