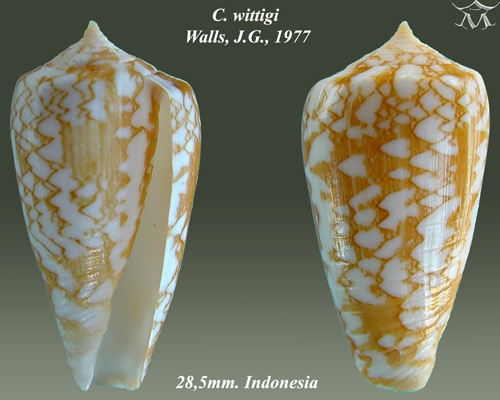
- Apertural and abapertural views of shell of Conus wittigi Walls, J.G., 1977
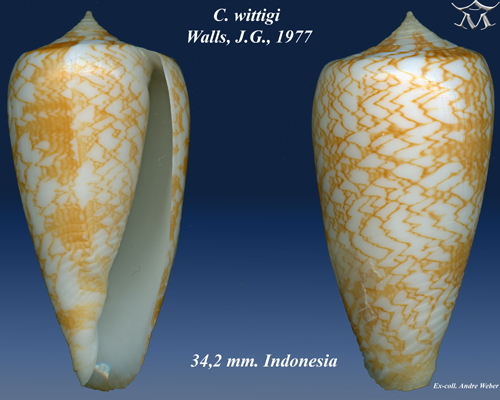

Conservation status
- Least Concern (IUCN 3.1)

Scientific classification
- Kingdom: Animalia
- Phylum: Mollusca
- Class: Gastropoda
- Subclass: Caenogastropoda
- Order: Neogastropoda
- Superfamily: Conoidea
- Family: Conidae
- Genus: Conus
- Species: C. wittigi

Binomial name
- Conus wittigi Walls, 1977

Synonyms
- Asprella wittigi (Walls, 1977); Conus kongaensis da Motta, 1984; Conus (Phasmoconus) wittigi Walls, 1977 · accepted, alternate representation; Graphiconus wittigi (Walls, 1977)

= Conus wittigi =

Species of sea snail

Conus wittigi, common name Wittig's cone, is a species of sea snail, a marine gastropod mollusk in the family Conidae, the cone snails and their allies.

Like all species within the genus Conus, these snails are predatory and venomous. They are capable of stinging humans, therefore live ones should be handled carefully or not at all.

== Description ==
The size of the shell varies between 22 mm and 42 mm.

== Distribution ==
This marine species occurs off Flores, Indonesia.
