= Conus aureopunctatus =

Conservation status
- Least Concern (IUCN 3.1)

Scientific classification
- Kingdom: Animalia
- Phylum: Mollusca
- Class: Gastropoda
- Subclass: Caenogastropoda
- Order: Neogastropoda
- Superfamily: Conoidea
- Family: Conidae
- Genus: Conus
- Species: C. aureopunctatus

Binomial name
- Conus aureopunctatus Petuch, 1987

Synonyms
- Conasprella aureopunctatus Petuch, 1987; Conus (Dauciconus) aureopunctatus Petuch, 1987 · accepted, alternate representation; Gradiconus aureopunctatus (Petuch, 1987)

Species of sea snail

Conus aureopunctatus is a species of sea snail, a marine gastropod mollusk in the family Conidae, the cone snails, cone shells or cones. These snails are predatory and venomous. They are capable of stinging humans.

== Description ==
Original description: "Shell small for genus, turnip-shaped, with wide body whorl and prominent constriction around anterior one-third, producing distinct anterior canal; shell shiny, polished; shoulder sharply carinated, with bladelike carina; spire elevated, scalariform; anterior third of shell ornamented with 10 thick, raised, spiral cords, each separated from others by deeply-incised sulci; base color of shell white; smooth portion of body whorl with 4 rows of pale yellow-orange dots; spiral cords on anterior end marked with yellow-orange dots; spire whorls smooth, with numerous crescent-shaped orange flammules; interior of aperture white; periostracum brown, thick, and smooth." The size of the shell attains 20 mm.

== Distribution ==
Locus typicus: Erroneously stated as "Gulf of Venezuela, off Punto Fijo, Falcon state, Venezuela"- but now corrected to Cabo Gracias a Dios on the Honduran-Nicaraguan border

This marine species of cone snail occurs in the Caribbean Sea off Nicaragua and Venezuela.
