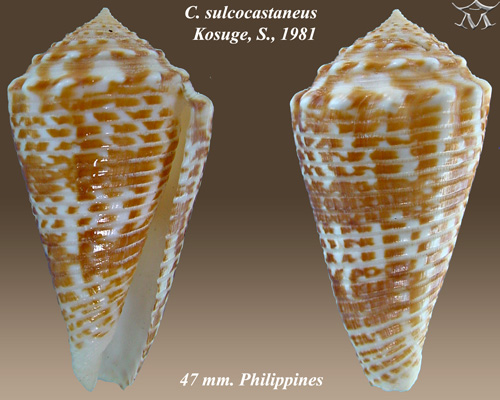
- Apertural and abapertural views of shell of Conus sulcocastaneus Kosuge, S., 1981
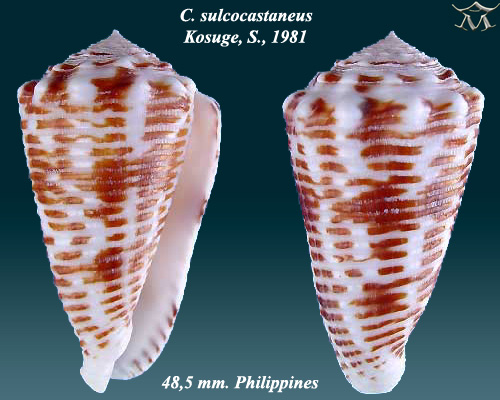

Conservation status
- Least Concern (IUCN 3.1)

Scientific classification
- Kingdom: Animalia
- Phylum: Mollusca
- Class: Gastropoda
- Subclass: Caenogastropoda
- Order: Neogastropoda
- Superfamily: Conoidea
- Family: Conidae
- Genus: Conus
- Species: C. sulcocastaneus

Binomial name
- Conus sulcocastaneus Kosuge, 1981

Synonyms
- Asprella sulcocastanea (Kosuge, 1981); Conus (Asprella) sulcocastaneus Kosuge, 1981 · accepted, alternate representation; Conus vicdani Kosuge, 1980 (invalid: junior homonym of Conus sugimotonis vicdani Lan, 1978; C. sulcocastaneus is a replacement name)

= Conus sulcocastaneus =

Species of sea snail

Conus sulcocastaneus is a species of sea snail, a marine gastropod mollusk in the family Conidae, the cone snails and their allies.

Like all species within the genus Conus, these snails are predatory and venomous. They are capable of stinging humans, therefore live ones should be handled carefully or not at all.

== Description ==
The size of the shell varies between 44 mm and 63 mm, with colors ranging from orange to red. A dotted stripe pattern is exhibited on the shells.

== Distribution ==
This marine species occurs off the Philippines and the Marshall Islands.
