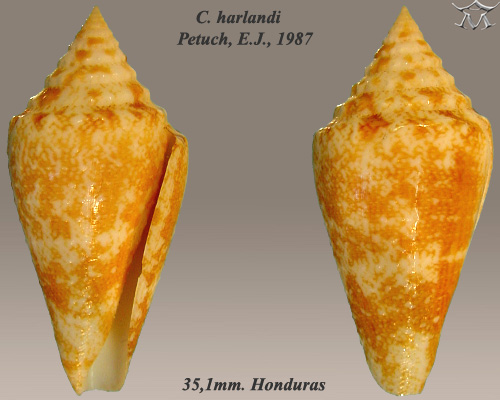
- Apertural and abapertural views of shell of Conus harlandi Petuch, E.J., 1987
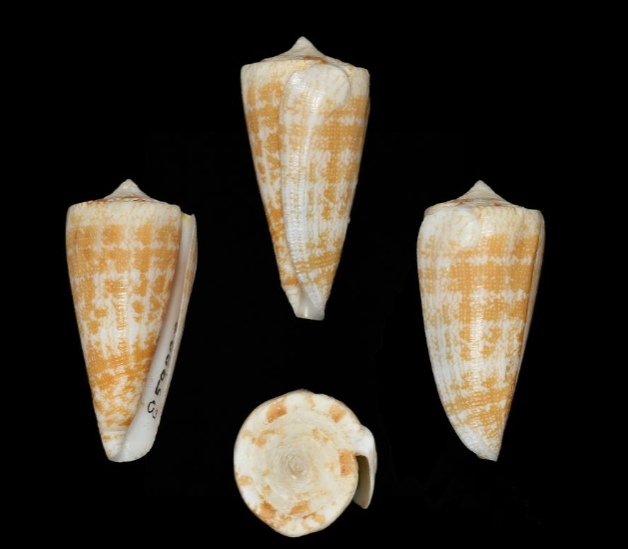

Scientific classification
- Kingdom: Animalia
- Phylum: Mollusca
- Class: Gastropoda
- Subclass: Caenogastropoda
- Order: Neogastropoda
- Superfamily: Conoidea
- Family: Conidae
- Genus: Conus
- Species: C. harlandi

Binomial name
- Conus harlandi Petuch, 1987

Synonyms
- Conus (Stephanoconus) harlandi Petuch, 1987 · accepted, alternate representation; Protoconus harlandi (Petuch, 1987); Tenorioconus harlandi (Petuch, 1987)

= Conus harlandi =

Species of sea snail

Conus harlandi is a species of sea snail, a marine gastropod mollusk in the family Conidae, the cone snails and their allies.

Like all species within the genus Conus, these snails are predatory and venomous. They are capable of stinging humans, therefore live ones should be handled carefully or not at all.

== Distribution ==
Locus typicus: Utila Island, Bay Islands, Honduras, Western Caribbean Sea. This species occurs in the Caribbean Sea off Belize and Honduras and as far South as Costa Rica.

== Description ==
Original description: "Shell tapered, elongated; spire low, almost flattened; edge of shoulder sharp, smooth, without coronations; body whorl polished, shiny, covered with numerous very fine, closely-packed spiral threads, giving shell silky appearance; shell color reddish-brown to chestnut, overlaid with 12-15 evenly-spaced bands of tiny, white flammules and dots; one wide white band around shoulder, one around anterior tip, each, in turn, containing tiny reddish-brown dots and hairlike flammules; some specimens (as in the holotype) with white axial bands that correspond to previous lip edges; axial bands intersect spiral bands of white dots to produce checkered appearance; aperture long, narrow; interior of aperture with rose-pink shading; spire white, with scattered large reddish-brown blotches and numerous thin, hairlike flammules in between; periostracum thin, transparent.

Holotype: Length 33 mm, width 17 mm, in sand near weed beds, at 60 ft. depth off Utila Island, Bay Islands, Honduras, 1986 - USNM 859883.

Paratypes: 2 specimens, lengths 11 and 26 mm, same locality and depth as holotype, Harland collection; 20 specimens, same location as holotype, Sunderland collection; 2 specimens, same locality - USNM 859907. "

The maximum recorded shell length is 36 mm.

== Habitat ==
Minimum recorded depth is 12 m. Maximum recorded depth is 18 m.
