= Conus dispar =

Conservation status
- Least Concern (IUCN 3.1)

Scientific classification
- Kingdom: Animalia
- Phylum: Mollusca
- Class: Gastropoda
- Subclass: Caenogastropoda
- Order: Neogastropoda
- Superfamily: Conoidea
- Family: Conidae
- Genus: Conus
- Species: C. dispar

Binomial name
- Conus dispar G. B. Sowerby I, 1833

Synonyms
- Conus (Dauciconus) dispar G. B. Sowerby I, 1833 · accepted, alternate representation; Gradiconus dispar (G. B. Sowerby I, 1833)

Species of sea snail

Conus dispar is a species of sea snail, a marine gastropod mollusk in the family Conidae, the cone snails and their allies.

Like all species within the genus Conus, these snails are predatory and venomous. They are capable of stinging humans, therefore live ones should be handled carefully or not at all.

== Description ==
The size of the shell varies between 15 mm and 34 mm. The color of the shell is white or yellowish white, with chestnut-chocolate maculations and spots, variously arranged in revolving series. Sometimes the ground-color of the shell is chestnut, with dark chocolate markings and chocolate aperture. The spire is somewhat concavely elevated, with an acute apex. The epidermis is thin, smooth and translucent.

== Distribution ==
This marine species occurs in the Gulf of California, Mexico and in the Pacific Ocean down to Panama.
