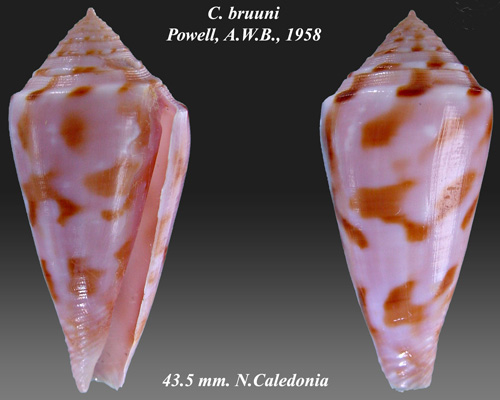
- Apertural and abapertural views of shell of Conus bruuni Powell, A.W.B., 1958
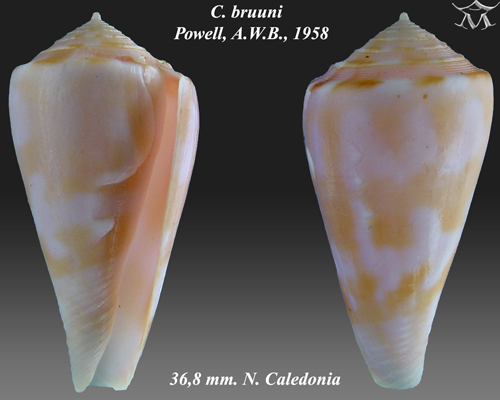

Conservation status
- Least Concern (IUCN 3.1)

Scientific classification
- Kingdom: Animalia
- Phylum: Mollusca
- Class: Gastropoda
- Subclass: Caenogastropoda
- Order: Neogastropoda
- Superfamily: Conoidea
- Family: Conidae
- Genus: Conus
- Species: C. bruuni

Binomial name
- Conus bruuni (Powell, 1958)

Synonyms
- Afonsoconus bruuni (Powell, 1958); Conus (Afonsoconus) bruuni Powell, 1958 · accepted, alternate representation; Conus (Dauciconus) bruuni Powell, 1958; Asprella bruuni (Powell, 1958)

= Conus bruuni =

Species of sea snail

Conus bruuni is a species of sea snail, a marine gastropod mollusk in the family Conidae, the cone snails and their allies.

These snails are predatory and venomous. They are capable of stinging humans, therefore live ones should be handled carefully or not at all.

== Description ==
The size of the shell varies between 33 mm and 61 mm.

== Distribution ==
This marine species occurs off New Zealand (Kermadec Islands) and off New Caledonia.

Conus bruuni is a deep-water species; off New Caledonia it is among the most abundant cone snails found below 100 m depth.
