= Conus caysalensis =

Conservation status
- Least Concern (IUCN 3.1)

Scientific classification
- Kingdom: Animalia
- Phylum: Mollusca
- Class: Gastropoda
- Subclass: Caenogastropoda
- Order: Neogastropoda
- Superfamily: Conoidea
- Family: Conidae
- Genus: Conus
- Species: C. caysalensis

Binomial name
- Conus caysalensis L. Raybaudi & Prati, 1994

Synonyms
- Conus (Dauciconus) caysalensis L. Raybaudi & Prati, 1994 · accepted, alternate representation; Purpuriconus caysalensis (L. Raybaudi & Prati, 1994)

Species of sea snail

Conus caysalensis is a species of sea snail, a marine gastropod mollusk in the family Conidae, the cone snails, cone shells or cones.

These snails are predatory and venomous. They are capable of stinging humans.

== Description ==
The size of the shell varies between 13 mm and 20 mm.

== Distribution ==
This marine species occurs off the Bahamas.
