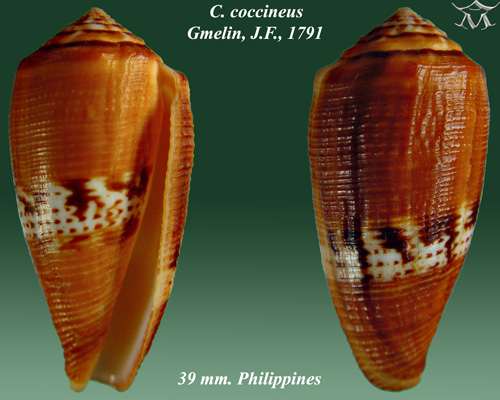
- Apertural and abapertural views of a shell of Conus coccineus Gmelin, J.F., 1791
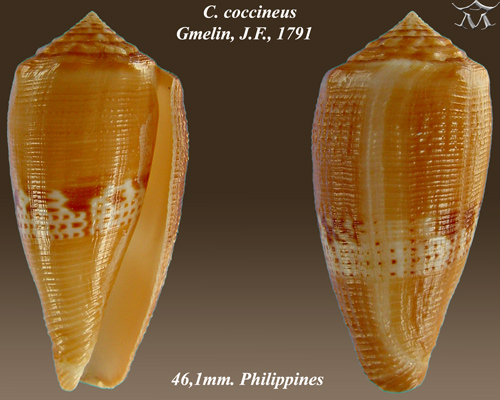

Conservation status
- Least Concern (IUCN 3.1)

Scientific classification
- Kingdom: Animalia
- Phylum: Mollusca
- Class: Gastropoda
- Subclass: Caenogastropoda
- Order: Neogastropoda
- Superfamily: Conoidea
- Family: Conidae
- Genus: Conus
- Species: C. coccineus

Binomial name
- Conus coccineus Gmelin, 1791

Synonyms
- Conus (Rubroconus) coccineus Gmelin, 1791 · accepted, alternate representation; Conus ammiralis var. anglicus Gmelin, 1791; Conus solandri Broderip & G. B. Sowerby I, 1830; Rolaniconus coccineus (Gmelin, 1791); Rubroconus coccineus (Gmelin, 1791)

= Conus coccineus =

Species of sea snail

Conus coccineus, common name the berry cone or the scarlet cone, is a species of sea snail, a marine gastropod mollusk in the family Conidae, the cone snails and their allies.

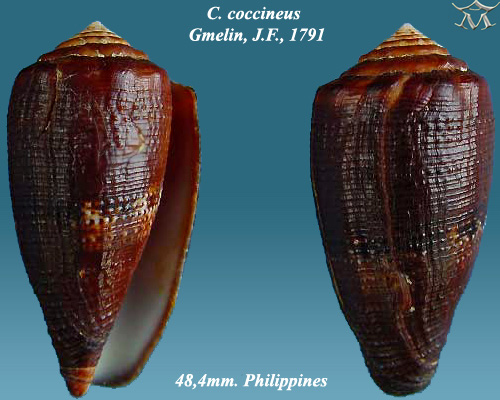
Conus coccineus Gmelin, J.F., 1791

Like all species within the genus Conus, these snails are predatory and venomous. They are capable of stinging humans, therefore live ones should be handled carefully or not at all.

== Description ==
The size of the shell varies between 27 mm and 62 mm. The thin shell has somewhat convex sides. It is encircled by striae, which are often minutely granular. The spire is moderate, sometimes gradate, striate, and obsoletely coronated. The color of the shell is orange pink, with a white central band, variegated with dark brown spots and blotches. The spire is usually maculated.

== Distribution ==
This marine species occurs off Indonesia, New Caledonia, Palawan, the Philippines, Samar, the Solomon Islands, Vanuatu and Australia (the Northern Territory, Queensland)
