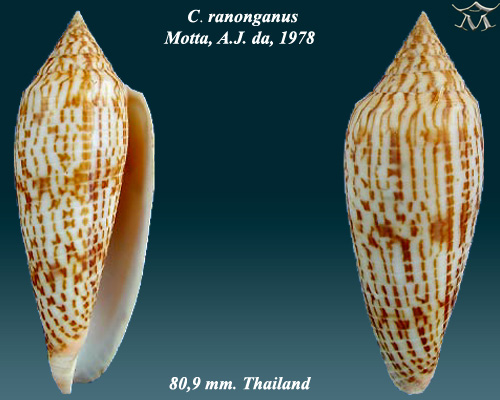
- Apertural and abapertural views of shell of Conus ranonganus Motta, A.J. da, 1978

Conservation status
- Least Concern (IUCN 3.1)

Scientific classification
- Kingdom: Animalia
- Phylum: Mollusca
- Class: Gastropoda
- Subclass: Caenogastropoda
- Order: Neogastropoda
- Superfamily: Conoidea
- Family: Conidae
- Genus: Conus
- Species: C. ranonganus

Binomial name
- Conus ranonganus da Motta, 1978

Synonyms
- Asprella ranongana (da Motta, 1978); Conus (Phasmoconus) ranongana da Motta, 1978 accepted, alternate representation; Graphiconus ranonganus (da Motta, 1978) ·

= Conus ranonganus =

Species of sea snail

Conus ranonganus is a species of sea snail, a marine gastropod mollusk in the family Conidae, the cone snails and their allies.

Like all species within the genus Conus, these snails are predatory and venomous. They are capable of stinging humans, therefore live ones should be handled carefully or not at all.

== Description ==
The size of the shell varies between 64 mm and 105 mm.

== Distribution ==
This marine species occurs off Southwest Thailand; in the Andaman Sea and off Burma, and the Solomon Islands.
