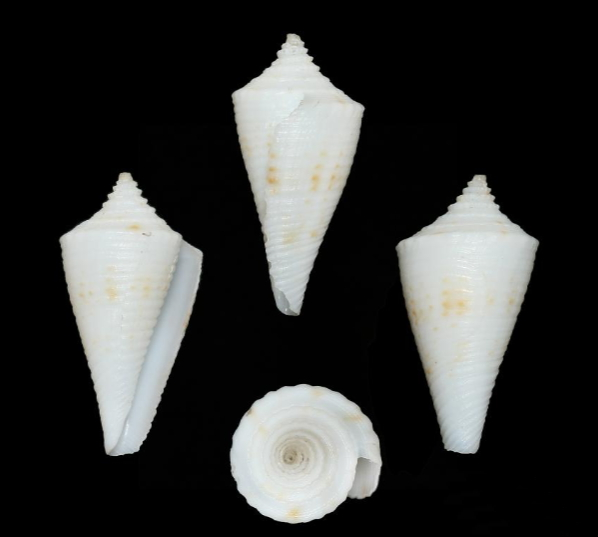
- Shell and protoconch of Conus kevani (holotype at the Smithsonian Institution)

Scientific classification
- Kingdom: Animalia
- Phylum: Mollusca
- Class: Gastropoda
- Subclass: Caenogastropoda
- Order: Neogastropoda
- Superfamily: Conoidea
- Family: Conidae
- Genus: Conus
- Species: C. kevani

Binomial name
- Conus kevani Petuch, 1987

Synonyms
- Conasprelloides kevani (Petuch, 1987); Conus (Dauciconus) kevani Petuch, 1987 · accepted, alternate representation

= Conus kevani =

Species of sea snail

Conus kevani is a species of sea snail, a marine gastropod mollusk in the family Conidae, the cone snails and their allies.

Like all species within the genus Conus, these snails are predatory and venomous. They are capable of stinging humans, therefore live ones should be handled carefully or not at all.

== Description ==
Original description: "Shell small for genus, thin, fragile; spire elevated with slightly concave sides; shoulder strongly keeled; shoulder keel ornamented with prominent, beadlike coronations; coronations become stronger on last whorl; body whorl heavily sculptured with 30 large cords; fine spiral threads between cords; spire whorls ornamented with 3 thin spiral threads; color pure white with 2 broken bands of pale brown dots, one above mid-body, one below mid-body; interior of aperture white; periostracum thin, pale brown, smooth."

The maximum recorded shell length is 17 mm.

== Distribution ==
Locus typicus: "Gulf of Venezuela, near Monges Islands, Venezuela."

This species occurs in the Caribbean Sea off Venezuela.

== Habitat ==
Minimum recorded depth is 35 m. Maximum recorded depth is 35 m.
