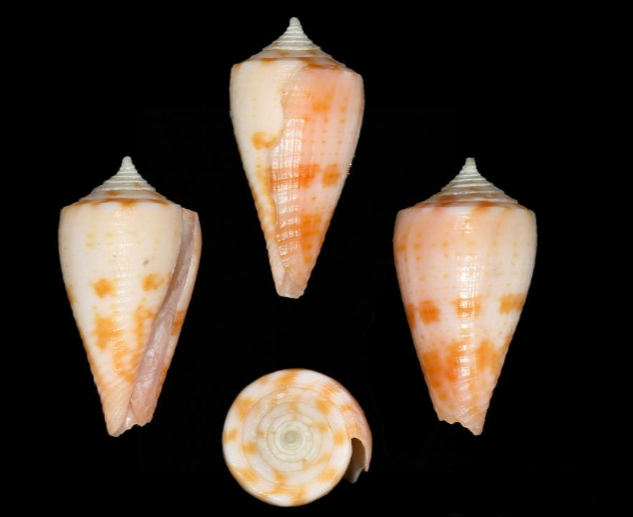
- Shell and protoconch of Conus binghamae (holotype at the Smithsonian Institution)

Conservation status
- Least Concern (IUCN 3.1)

Scientific classification
- Kingdom: Animalia
- Phylum: Mollusca
- Class: Gastropoda
- Subclass: Caenogastropoda
- Order: Neogastropoda
- Superfamily: Conoidea
- Family: Conidae
- Genus: Conus
- Species: C. binghamae

Binomial name
- Conus binghamae Petuch, 1987

Synonyms
- Conus (Kellyconus) binghamae Petuch, 1987 · accepted, alternate representation; Gladioconus binghamae (Petuch, 1987); Kellyconus binghamae (Petuch, 1987)

= Conus binghamae =

Species of sea snail

Conus binghamae is a species of sea snail, a marine gastropod mollusk in the family Conidae, the cone snails, cone shells or cones.

These snails are predatory and venomous. They are capable of stinging humans.

== Description ==
Original description: "Shell small for genus, thin and delicate; spire low, with early whorls protracted; body whorl shiny, sculptured with fine spiral cords; spiral cords become stronger and larger around anterior one-third of body whorl; shoulder sharply-angled; aperture narrow; shell color pattern comprising darkly-colored anterior one-third and mid-body band of large square-shaped flammules; unpatterned posterior one-half of body whorl with rows of tiny dots; color varying from red, orange, apricot-yellow, to pink and bluish-purple (holotype reddish-orange with darker red-orange mid-body band and anterior tip); spire whorls with numerous crescent-shaped flammules; aperture of holotype dark red-orange; protoconch and early whorls bright yellow on all specimens, regardless of body whorl color."

The size of the shell attains 19 mm.

== Distribution ==
Locus typicus: "(Trawled from) 200 feet depth off Dania, Broward County, Florida, USA."

This marine species of Cone snail occurs off Southeast Florida, at a depth of 61 m.
