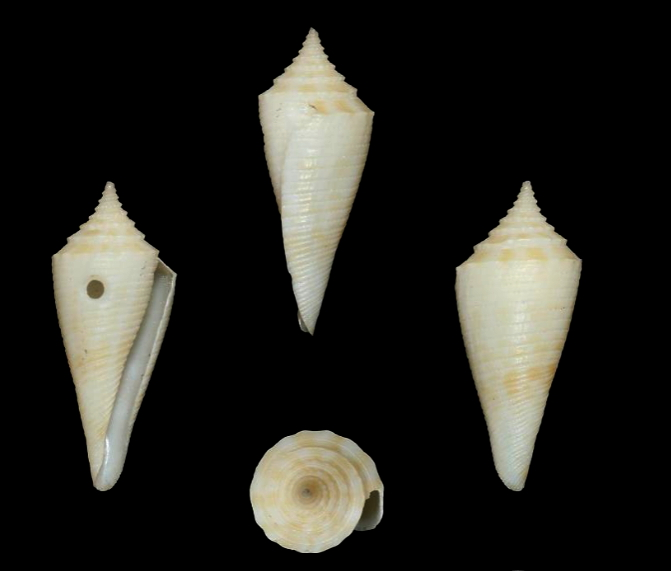
- Shell and protoconch of Conus kremerorum (holotype at the Smithsonian Institution)

Scientific classification
- Kingdom: Animalia
- Phylum: Mollusca
- Class: Gastropoda
- Subclass: Caenogastropoda
- Order: Neogastropoda
- Superfamily: Conoidea
- Family: Conidae
- Genus: Conus
- Species: C. kremerorum

Binomial name
- Conus kremerorum Petuch, 1988

Synonyms
- Conasprelloides kremerorum (Petuch, 1988); Conus (Dauciconus) kremerorum Petuch, 1988 · accepted, alternate representation; Dalliconus kremerorum (Petuch, 1988)

= Conus kremerorum =

Species of sea snail

Conus kremerorum is a species of sea snail, a marine gastropod mollusk in the family Conidae, the cone snails and their allies.

Like all species within the genus Conus, these snails are predatory and venomous. They are capable of stinging humans, therefore live ones should be handled carefully or not at all.

== Description ==
The maximum recorded shell length is 30 mm.

== Distribution ==
This species occurs in the Caribbean Sea off Barbados at a depth of 70 m.

== Habitat ==
Minimum recorded depth is 70 m. Maximum recorded depth is 70 m.
