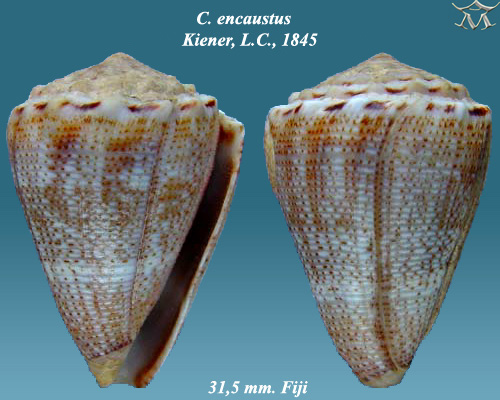
- Apertural and abapertural views of shell of Conus encaustus Kiener, L.C., 1845
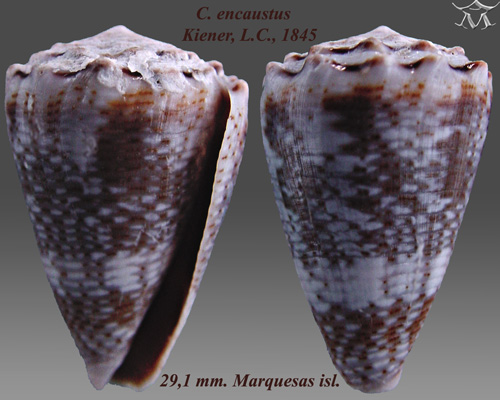

Conservation status
- Least Concern (IUCN 3.1)

Scientific classification
- Kingdom: Animalia
- Phylum: Mollusca
- Class: Gastropoda
- Subclass: Caenogastropoda
- Order: Neogastropoda
- Superfamily: Conoidea
- Family: Conidae
- Genus: Conus
- Species: C. encaustus

Binomial name
- Conus encaustus Kiener, 1845

Synonyms
- Conus (Virroconus) encaustus Kiener, 1845; Conus praetextus Reeve, 1848; Miliariconus encaustus Kiener, L.C., 1845

= Conus encaustus =

Species of sea snail

Conus encaustus, common name the burnt cone, is a species of sea snail, a marine gastropod mollusk in the family Conidae, the cone snails and their allies.

Like all species within the genus Conus, these snails are predatory and venomous. They are capable of stinging humans, therefore live ones should be handled carefully or not at all.

== Description ==
The size of an adult shell varies between 21.1 mm and 35 mm. The spire is depressed, grooved and coronated with tubercles. The body whorl has distant punctured grooves, more strongly and closely grooved towards the base. The color of the shell is clouded with chocolate- and ash-color, and encircled with numerous chocolate and white spots in lines. The aperture is purplish.

== Distribution ==
This marine species is endemic to the Marquesas Islands.
