= Conus tisii =

Conservation status
- Least Concern (IUCN 3.1)

Scientific classification
- Kingdom: Animalia
- Phylum: Mollusca
- Class: Gastropoda
- Subclass: Caenogastropoda
- Order: Neogastropoda
- Superfamily: Conoidea
- Family: Conidae
- Genus: Conus
- Species: C. tisii

Binomial name
- Conus tisii Lan, 1978

Synonyms
- Asprella tisii (T. C. Lan, 1978); Conus (Embrikena) tisii T.C. Lan, 1978 · accepted, alternate representation; Embrikena tisii (T. C. Lan, 1978)

Species of sea snail

Conus tisii is a species of sea snail, a marine gastropod mollusk in the family Conidae, the cone snails and their allies.

Like all species within the genus Conus, these snails are predatory and venomous. They are capable of stinging humans, therefore live ones should be handled carefully or not at all.

== Description ==
The size of the shell varies between 40 mm and 150 mm. They inhabit moderately deep waters, by about 100–400 meters. They are described as carnivorous and predatory gastropods. (Conchology, 1978)

== Distribution ==
This marine species occurs in the Philippines, Taiwan, and Southern Japan.
