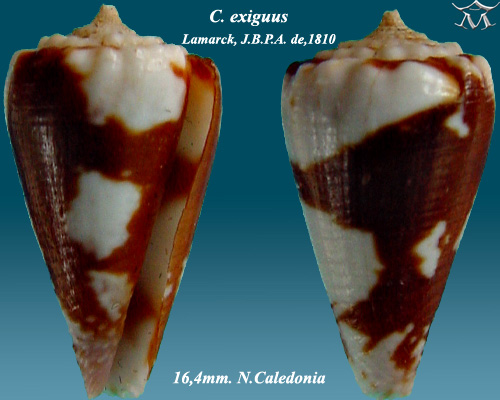
- Apertural and abapertural views of shell of Conus exiguus Lamarck, J.B.P.A. de, 1810
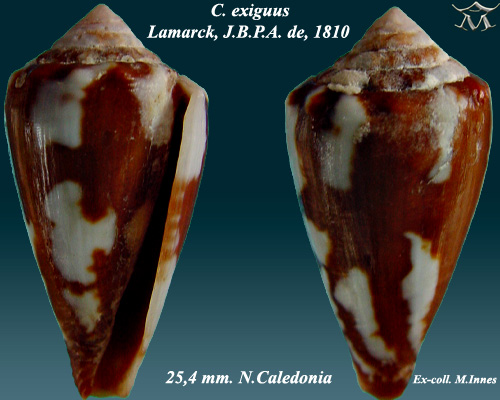

Conservation status
- Least Concern (IUCN 3.1)

Scientific classification
- Kingdom: Animalia
- Phylum: Mollusca
- Class: Gastropoda
- Subclass: Caenogastropoda
- Order: Neogastropoda
- Superfamily: Conoidea
- Family: Conidae
- Genus: Conus
- Species: C. exiguus

Binomial name
- Conus exiguus Lamarck, 1810

Synonyms
- Conus (Phasmoconus) exiguus Lamarck, 1810 accepted, alternate representation; Conus bougei G. B. Sowerby III, 1907; Conus bougei var. poumensis Prigent, 1985; Conus cabritii Bernardi, 1858; Conus optimus G. B. Sowerby III, 1913; Conus plumbeus Reeve, 1844; Conus taylorianus E. A. Smith, 1880; Conus vayssetianus Crosse, 1872; Fulgiconus exiguus (Lamarck, 1810)

= Conus exiguus =

Species of sea snail

Conus exiguus, common name Cabrit's cone, is a species of sea snail: a marine gastropod mollusk in the family Conidae, the cone snails and their allies.

Like all species within the genus Conus, these snails are predatory and venomous. They are capable of stinging humans, therefore live ones should be handled carefully or not at all.

== Description ==
The size of the shell varies between 14 mm and 54 mm. The violaceous shell is more or less marbled with chestnut, and more or less granular on the body whorl. The convex spire convex is conical and tuberculated. The aperture is violaceous.

== Distribution ==
This marine species occurs off New Caledonia, Samoa, and Vietnam.

== Gallery ==
Below are several color forms:

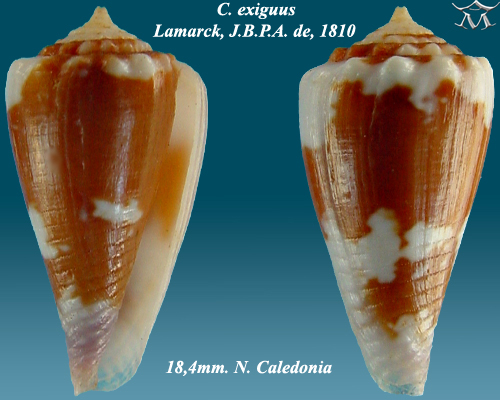
Conus exiguus Lamarck, J.B.P.A. de, 1810

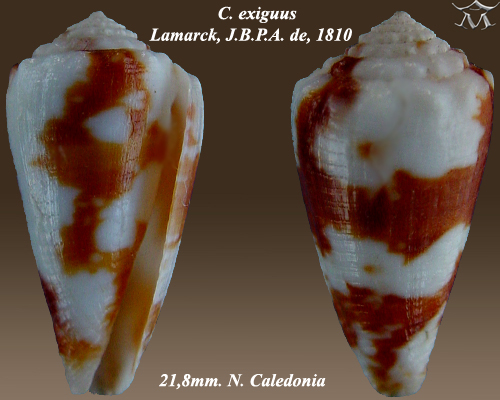
Conus exiguus Lamarck, J.B.P.A. de, 1810

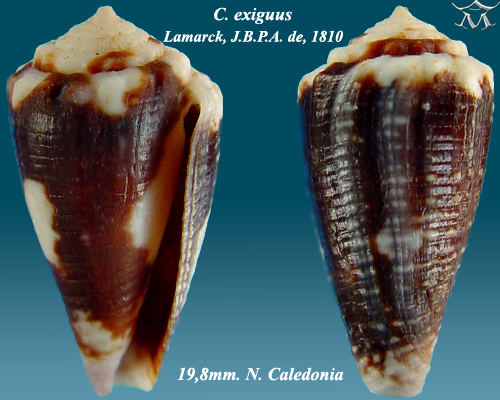
Conus exiguus Lamarck, J.B.P.A. de, 1810
