= Conus velaensis =

Conservation status
- Least Concern (IUCN 3.1)

Scientific classification
- Kingdom: Animalia
- Phylum: Mollusca
- Class: Gastropoda
- Subclass: Caenogastropoda
- Order: Neogastropoda
- Superfamily: Conoidea
- Family: Conidae
- Genus: Conus
- Species: C. velaensis

Binomial name
- Conus velaensis Petuch, 1993

Synonyms
- Conus (Dauciconus) velaensis Petuch, 1993 · accepted, alternate representation; Purpuriconus velaensis (Petuch, 1993)

Species of sea snail

Conus velaensis is a species of sea snail, a marine gastropod mollusk in the family Conidae, the cone snails and their allies.

Like all species within the genus Conus, these snails are predatory and venomous. They are capable of stinging humans, therefore live ones should be handled carefully or not at all.

== Distribution ==
This species occurs in the Caribbean Sea off Colombia

== Description ==
The maximum recorded shell length is 31 mm.

== Habitat ==
Minimum recorded depth is 35 m. Maximum recorded depth is 35 m.
