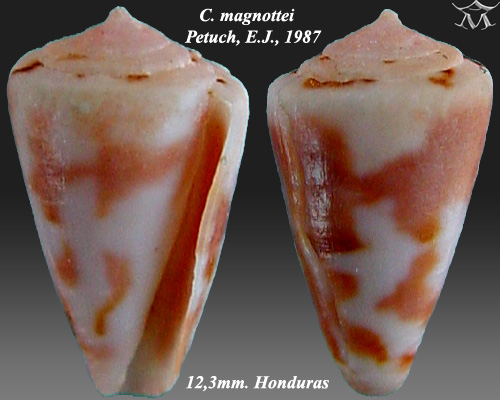
- Apertural and abapertural views of shell of Conus magnottei Petuch, E.J., 1987
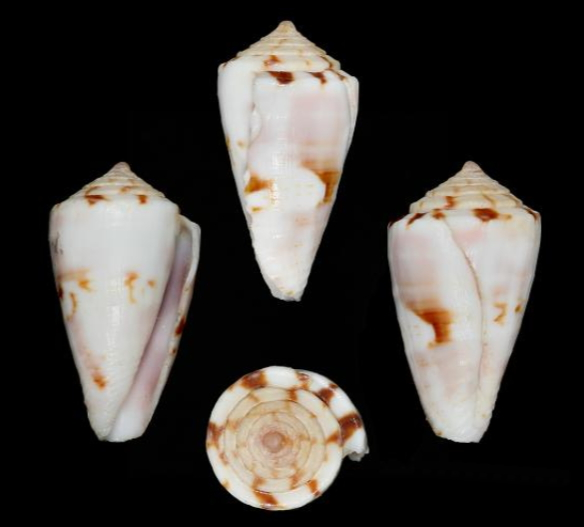

Scientific classification
- Kingdom: Animalia
- Phylum: Mollusca
- Class: Gastropoda
- Subclass: Caenogastropoda
- Order: Neogastropoda
- Superfamily: Conoidea
- Family: Conidae
- Genus: Conus
- Species: C. magnottei

Binomial name
- Conus magnottei Petuch, 1987

Synonyms
- Conus (Dauciconus) magnottei Petuch, 1987 · accepted, alternate representation; Purpuriconus magnottei (Petuch, 1987)

= Conus magnottei =

Species of sea snail

Conus magnottei is a species of sea snail, a marine gastropod mollusk in the family Conidae, the cone snails and their allies.

Like all species within the genus Conus, these snails are predatory and venomous. They are capable of stinging humans, therefore live ones should be handled carefully or not at all.

== Description ==
Original description: "Shell small for genus, squat in form; spire low, smooth, without coronations; body whorl smooth, shiny, without sculpturing; anterior tip with few small, low cords; color bright purplish-pink to lilac, with numerous white patches and flammules; white or pale pink band around mid-body; holotype with band of dark brown and white patches around mid-body; spire white, with some specimens having scattered dark brown flammules (such as holotype); protoconch and early whorls bright pink; interior of aperture purple."

The maximum recorded shell length is 14 mm.

== Distribution ==
Locus typicus: "North coast of Roatan Island, Honduras."

This species occurs in the Caribbean Sea off Belize and Honduras.

== Habitat ==
Minimum recorded depth is 2 m. Maximum recorded depth is 2 m.
