= Conus scopulorum =

Conservation status
- Least Concern (IUCN 3.1)

Scientific classification
- Domain: Eukaryota
- Kingdom: Animalia
- Phylum: Mollusca
- Class: Gastropoda
- Subclass: Caenogastropoda
- Order: Neogastropoda
- Superfamily: Conoidea
- Family: Conidae
- Genus: Conus
- Species: C. scopulorum

Binomial name
- Conus scopulorum Van Mol, Tursch & Kempf, 1971

Synonyms
- Brasiliconus scopulorum (van Mol, Tursch & Kempf, 1971); Conus (Brasiliconus) scopulorum van Mol, Tursch & Kempf, 1971 · accepted, alternate representation; Leptoconus scopulorum (Van Mol, Tursch & Kempf, 1971); Protoconus scopulorum (van Mol, Tursch & Kempf, 1971)

Species of sea snail

Conus scopulorum is a species of sea snail, a marine gastropod mollusk in the family Conidae, the cone snails and their allies.

Like all species within the genus Conus, these snails are predatory and venomous. They are capable of stinging humans, therefore live ones should be handled carefully or not at all.

== Distribution ==
This species occurs in the Atlantic Ocean off Brazil.

== Description ==
The maximum recorded shell length is 26.5 mm.

== Habitat ==
Minimum recorded depth is 47 m. Maximum recorded depth is 120 m.
