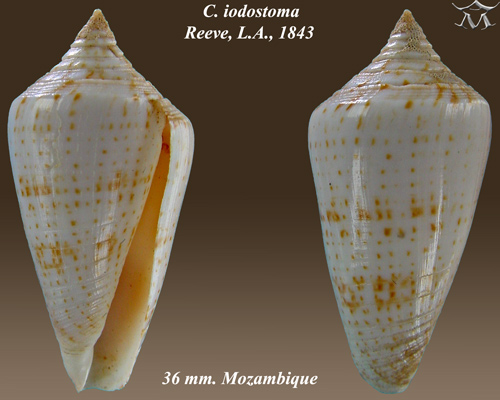
- Apertural and abapertural views of shell of Conus iodostoma Reeve, L.A., 1843

Scientific classification
- Kingdom: Animalia
- Phylum: Mollusca
- Class: Gastropoda
- Subclass: Caenogastropoda
- Order: Neogastropoda
- Superfamily: Conoidea
- Family: Conidae
- Genus: Conus
- Species: C. iodostoma

Binomial name
- Conus iodostoma Reeve, 1843

Synonyms
- Asprella iodostoma (Reeve, 1843); Conus hedgesi G. B. Sowerby III, 1913; Conus (Asprella) iodostoma Reeve, 1843 · accepted, alternate representation; Conus kieneri Reeve, 1849 (nomen dubium); Conus rosaceus Kiener, 1849 (invalid: junior homonym of Conus rosaceus Dillwyn, 1817 and Conus rosaceus G.B. Sowerby II, 1834); Conus superscriptus G. B. Sowerby III, 1877; Graphiconus iodostoma (Reeve, 1843)

= Conus iodostoma =

Species of sea snail

Conus iodostoma, common name the violet-mouth cone, is a species of sea snail, a marine gastropod mollusk in the family Conidae, the cone snails and their allies.

Like all species within the genus Conus, these snails are predatory and venomous. They are capable of stinging humans, therefore live ones should be handled carefully or not at all.

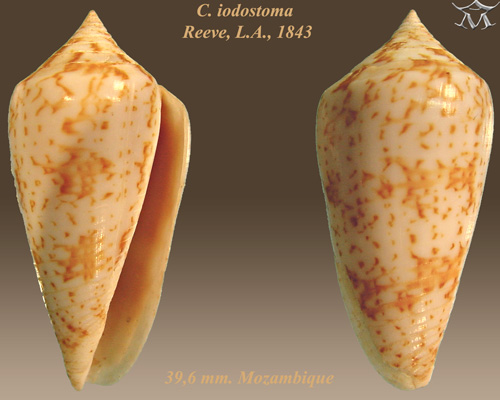
Conus iodostoma Reeve, L.A., 1843

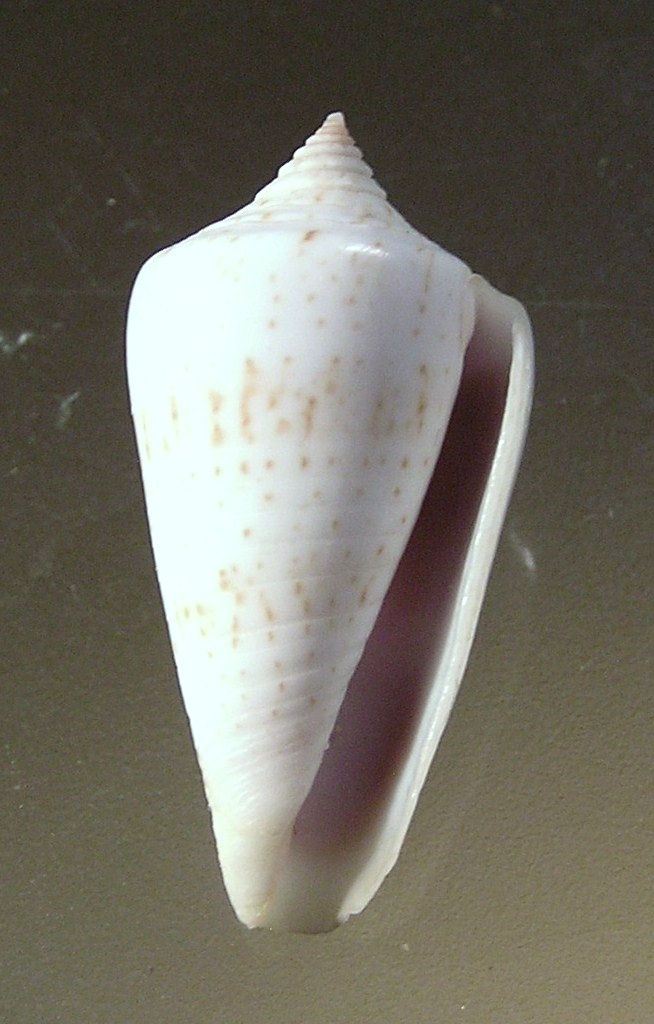
Apertural view of Conus iodostoma

== Description ==
The size of an adult shell varies between 25 mm and 47 mm. The shell is thin, narrow and somewhat inflated. The spire is finely grooved. The apex is sharp. The body whorl is striate towards the base. The color of the shell is violet-white, clouded with chestnut, with revolving lines of chestnut spots.

== Distribution ==
This species occurs in the Indian Ocean off Madagascar and Mozambique.
