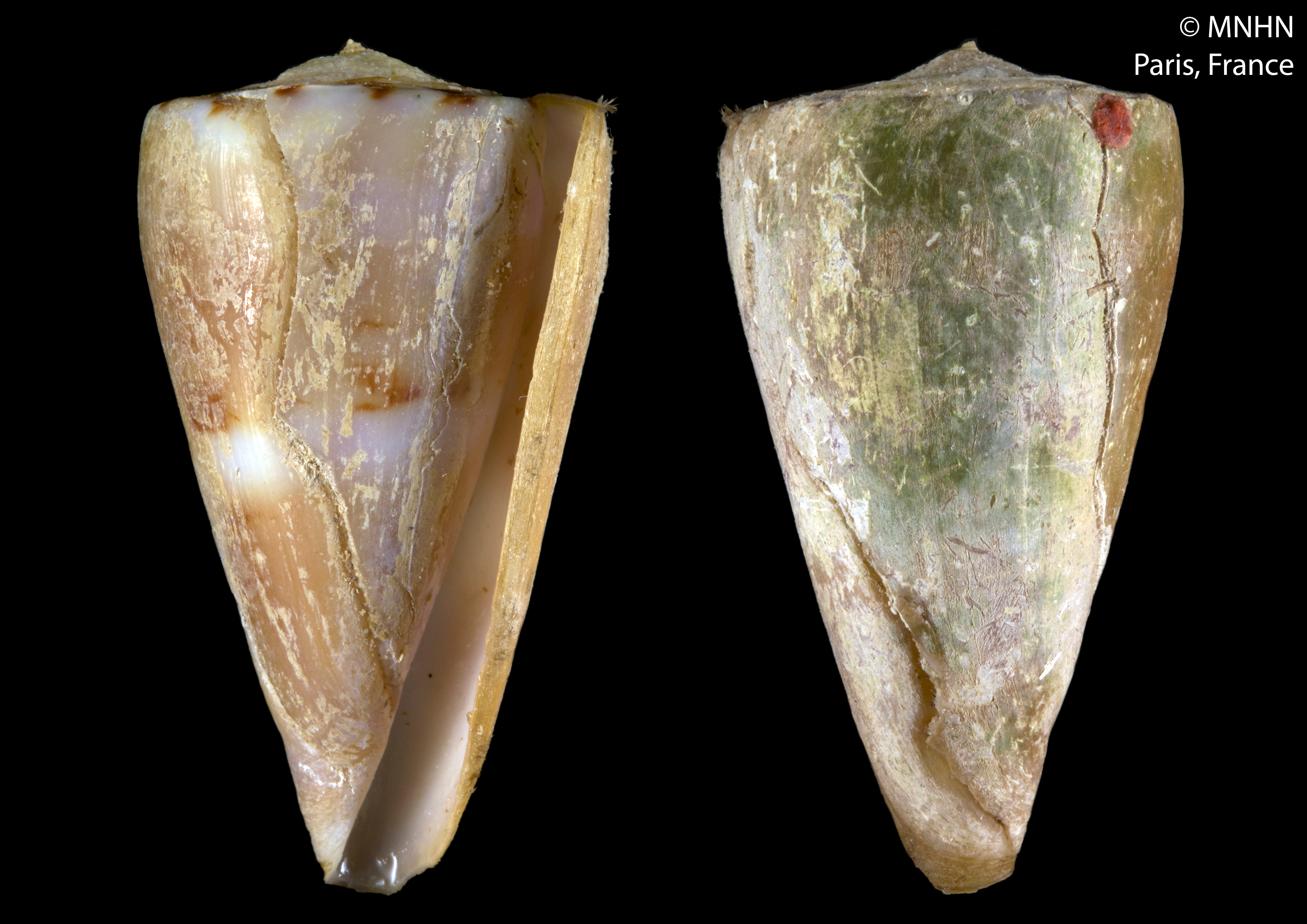
- Shell of Conus norai (specimen at MNHN, Paris)

Conservation status
- Least Concern (IUCN 3.1)

Scientific classification
- Kingdom: Animalia
- Phylum: Mollusca
- Class: Gastropoda
- Subclass: Caenogastropoda
- Order: Neogastropoda
- Superfamily: Conoidea
- Family: Conidae
- Genus: Conus
- Species: C. norai

Binomial name
- Conus norai da Motta & G. Raybaudi Massilia, 1992

Synonyms
- Dauciconus norai (da Motta & G. Raybaudi Massilia, 1992)

= Conus norai =

Species of sea snail

Conus norai is a species of sea snail, a marine gastropod mollusk, in the family Conidae, the cone snails and their allies.

== Distribution ==
This marine species occurs off Guadeloupe and Martinique and presumably in Dominica too, which lies between the two French islands.
