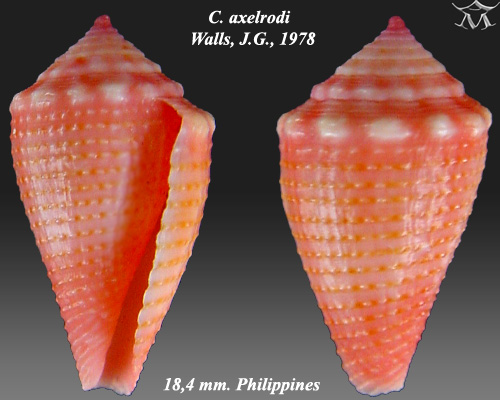
- Apertural and abapertural views of shell of Conus axelrodi Walls, J.G., 1978
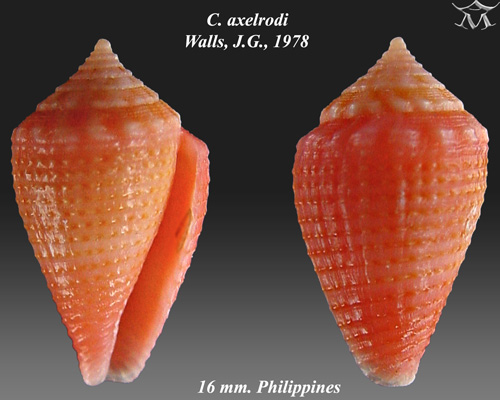

Conservation status
- Least Concern (IUCN 3.1)

Scientific classification
- Kingdom: Animalia
- Phylum: Mollusca
- Class: Gastropoda
- Subclass: Caenogastropoda
- Order: Neogastropoda
- Superfamily: Conoidea
- Family: Conidae
- Genus: Conus
- Species: C. axelrodi

Binomial name
- Conus axelrodi Walls, 1978

Synonyms
- Conus (Strategoconus) axelrodi Walls, 1978 accepted, alternate representation; Rolaniconus axelrodi (Walls, 1978)

= Conus axelrodi =

Species of sea snail

Conus axelrodi, common name Axelrod's cone, is a species of sea snail, a marine gastropod mollusk in the family Conidae, the cone snails and their allies.

Like all species within the genus Conus, these snails are predatory and venomous. They are capable of stinging humans, therefore live ones should be handled carefully or not at all.

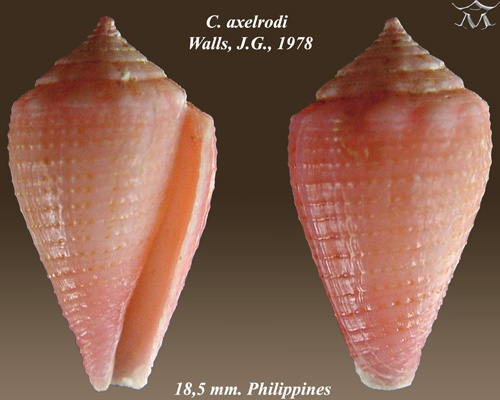
Conus axelrodi Walls, J.G., 1978

== Description ==
The size of the shell varies between 10 mm and 20 mm.

== Distribution ==
This marine species occurs off the Southern Philippines, Papua New Guinea, and Taiwan. It is also found in the marine neritic zone off the coasts of Malaysia and the island of Borneo.

== Habitat ==
Specimens of Conus axelrodi are benthic and have been recorded in shallow marine waters, with documented occurrences at depths ranging from 3 to 8 meters.
