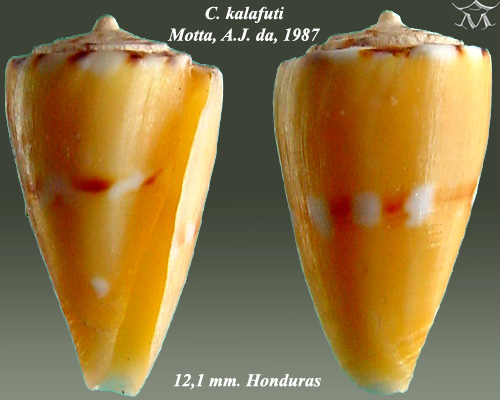
- Apertural and abapertural views of shell of Conus kalafuti Motta, A.J. da, 1987
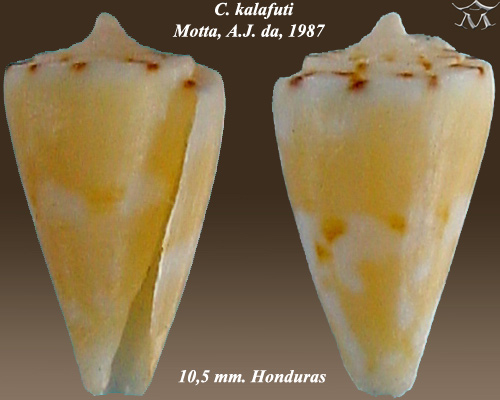

Scientific classification
- Kingdom: Animalia
- Phylum: Mollusca
- Class: Gastropoda
- Subclass: Caenogastropoda
- Order: Neogastropoda
- Superfamily: Conoidea
- Family: Conidae
- Genus: Conus
- Species: C. kalafuti

Binomial name
- Conus kalafuti da Motta, 1987

Synonyms
- Conus (Dauciconus) kalafuti da Motta, 1987 · accepted, alternate representation; Purpuriconus kalafuti (da Motta, 1987)

= Conus kalafuti =

Species of sea snail

Conus kalafuti is a species of sea snail, a marine gastropod mollusk in the family Conidae, the cone snails and their allies.

Like all species within the genus Conus, these snails are predatory and venomous. They are capable of stinging humans, therefore live ones should be handled carefully or not at all.

== Distribution ==
This marine species occurs in the Caribbean Sea off Belize and Honduras.

== Description ==
The maximum recorded shell length is 15 mm.

== Habitat ==
Minimum recorded depth is 1.5 m. Maximum recorded depth is 12 m.
