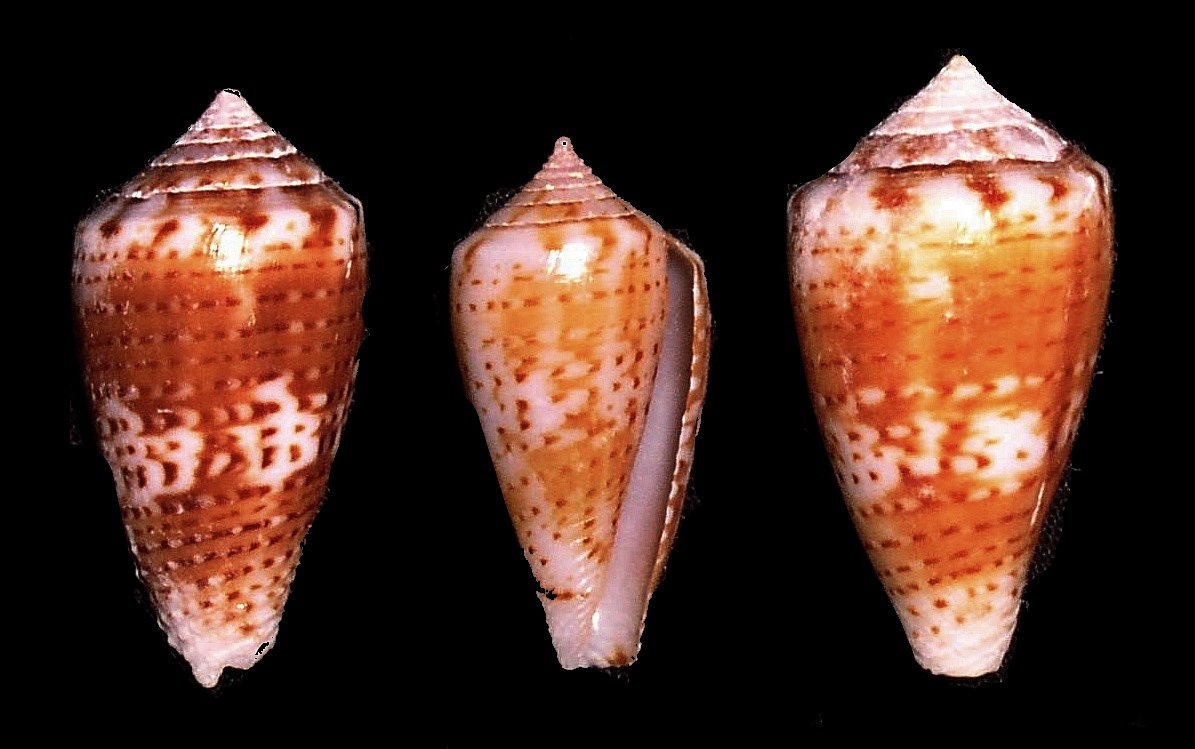

Conservation status
- Least Concern (IUCN 3.1)

Scientific classification
- Kingdom: Animalia
- Phylum: Mollusca
- Class: Gastropoda
- Subclass: Caenogastropoda
- Order: Neogastropoda
- Superfamily: Conoidea
- Family: Conidae
- Genus: Conus
- Species: C. boeticus

Binomial name
- Conus boeticus Reeve, 1844

Synonyms
- Conus (Splinoconus) boeticus Reeve, 1844 accepted, alternate representation; Conus cerinus Reeve, 1848; Conus fultoni G. B. Sowerby III, 1887; Conus lachrymosus Reeve, 1849; Conus meleus G. B. Sowerby III, 1913; Conus montillai Röckel, 1985; Conus nitidus Reeve, 1844; Conus rivularis Reeve, 1849; Conus ruppellii Reeve, 1848; Nitidoconus boeticus (Reeve, 1844); Nitidoconus montillai (Röckel, 1985); Rolaniconus boeticus (Reeve, 1844); Rolaniconus boeticus boeticus Reeve, 1844

= Conus boeticus =

Species of sea snail

Conus boeticus, common name the boeticus cone, is a species of sea snail, a marine gastropod mollusk in the family Conidae, the cone snails and their allies.

Like all species within the genus Conus, these snails are predatory and venomous. They are capable of stinging humans, therefore live ones should be handled carefully or not at all.

== Description ==
The shell size varies between 15 mm and 40 mm. The striate spire is slightly tuberculate. The body whorl is granular, striate towards the base. The color of the shell is white, marbled with chestnut or chocolate, with revolving rows of chestnut spots.

== Distribution ==
This species occurs in the Indian Ocean off Mozambique, the Seychelles and the Mascarene Basin and in the Pacific Ocean off Japan, Indonesia, Fiji and Australia.
