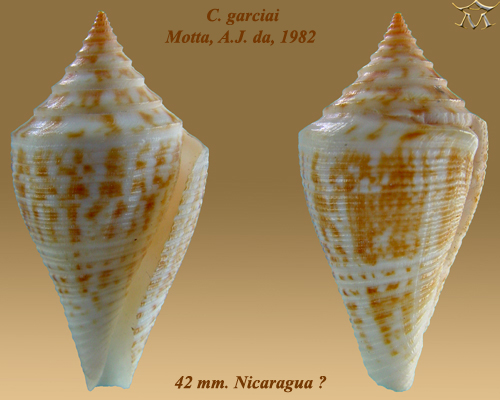
- Apertural and abapertural views of shell of Conus garciai Motta, A.J. da, 1982
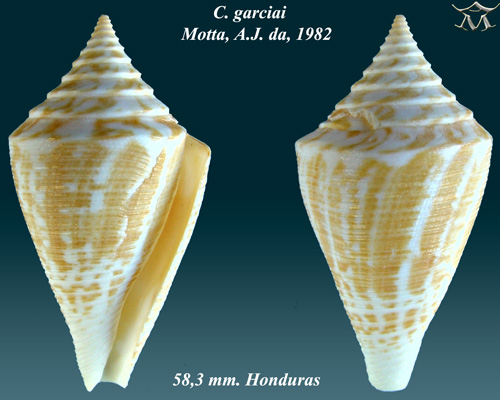

Conservation status
- Least Concern (IUCN 3.1)

Scientific classification
- Kingdom: Animalia
- Phylum: Mollusca
- Class: Gastropoda
- Subclass: Caenogastropoda
- Order: Neogastropoda
- Superfamily: Conoidea
- Family: Conidae
- Genus: Conus
- Species: C. garciai

Binomial name
- Conus garciai da Motta, 1982

Synonyms
- Conus (Dauciconus) garciai da Motta, 1982 · accepted, alternate representation; Gradiconus garciai (da Motta, 1982)

= Conus garciai =

Species of sea snail

Conus garciai is a species of sea snail, a marine gastropod mollusk in the family Conidae, the cone snails and their allies.

Like all species within the genus Conus, these snails are predatory and venomous. They are capable of stinging humans, therefore live ones should be handled carefully or not at all.

== Distribution ==
This species occurs in the Caribbean Sea off Belize, Honduras and Panama.

== Description ==
The maximum recorded shell length is 69 mm.

== Habitat ==
Minimum recorded depth is 37 m. Maximum recorded depth is 49 m.
