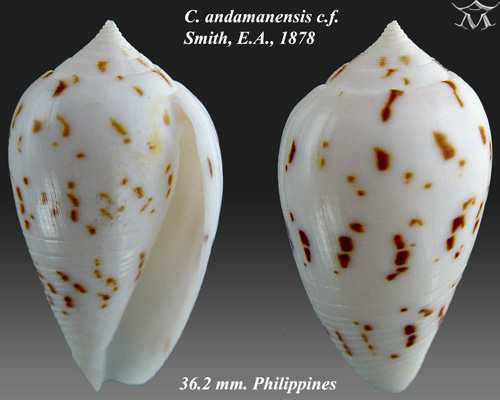
- Apertural and abapertural views of shell of Conus andamanensis (E.A. Smith, 1878)

Scientific classification
- Kingdom: Animalia
- Phylum: Mollusca
- Class: Gastropoda
- Subclass: Caenogastropoda
- Order: Neogastropoda
- Family: Conidae
- Genus: Conus
- Subgenus: Phasmoconus; Mörch, 1852

Type species
- Conus radiatus Gmelin, 1791

Synonyms
- Fulgiconus da Motta, 1991; Graphiconus da Motta,1991; Nimboconus Tucker & Tenorio, 2013; Phasmoconus Mörch, 1852; Thoraconus da Motta, 1991

= Conus (Phasmoconus) =

Subgenus of gastropods

Phasmoconus is a subgenus of sea snails, marine gastropod molluscs in the genus Conus, family Conidae, the cone snails and their allies.

In the latest classification of the family Conidae by Puillandre N., Duda T.F., Meyer C., Olivera B.M. & Bouchet P. (2015), Phasmoconus has become a subgenus of Conus as Conus (Phasmoconus) Mörch, 1852 (type species: Conus radiatus Gmelin, 1791 ) represented as Conus Linnaeus, 1758

== Distinguishing characteristics ==
The Tucker & Tenorio 2009 taxonomy distinguishes Phasmoconus from Conus in the following ways:

- Genus Conus sensu stricto Linnaeus, 1758

Shell characters (living and fossil species)

The basic shell shape is conical to elongated conical, has a deep anal notch on the shoulder, a smooth periostracum and a small operculum. The shoulder of the shell is usually nodulose and the protoconch is usually multispiral. Markings often include the presence of tents except for black or white color variants, with the absence of spiral lines of minute tents and textile bars.

Radular tooth (not known for fossil species)

The radula has an elongated anterior section with serrations and a large exposed terminating cusp, a non-obvious waist, blade is either small or absent and has a short barb, and lacks a basal spur.

Geographical distribution

These species are found in the Indo-Pacific region.

Feeding habits

These species eat other gastropods including cones.

- Subgenus Phasmoconus Mörch, 1852

Shell characters (living and fossil species)

The shell is elongated and subcylindrical in shape with angulate shoulders. The protoconch is usually multispiral, but rarely paucispiral. The anal notch is shallow, and an anterior notch is either slight or absent. The periostracum is smooth, and the operculum is small.

Radular tooth (not known for fossil species)

The anterior section of the radular tooth is approximately the same length as the posterior section but in some species one section may be longer than the other. The blade extends less than one-half the length of the anterior section of the radular tooth. A basal spur is absent, and the barb is short. The waist is obvious, and there is an elongated terminating cusp. There is a short row of serrations between the barb and accessory process.

Geographical distribution

The species in this genus occur in the Indo-Pacific and Australian regions.

Feeding habits

These species are piscivorous, meaning that these cone snails prey on fish.

== Species list ==
This list of species is based on the information in the World Register of Marine Species (WoRMS) list. Species within the genus Phasmoconus include:

- Phasmoconus alabaster (Reeve, 1849): synonym of Conus alabaster Reeve, 1849
- Phasmoconus alexandrei Limpalaër & Monnier, 2012: synonym of Conus alexandrei (Limpalaër & Monnier, 2012)
- Phasmoconus andamanensis (E.A. Smith, 1878): synonym of Conus andamanensis E. A. Smith, 1879
- Phasmoconus angioiorum (Röckel & Moolenbeek, 1992): synonym of Conus angioiorum Röckel & Moolenbeek, 1992
- Phasmoconus asiaticus (da Motta, 1985): synonym of Conus asiaticus da Motta, 1985
- Phasmoconus balabacensis (Filmer, 2012) : synonym of Conus (Phasmoconus) balabacensis Filmer, 2012 represented as Conus balabacensis Filmer, 2012
- Phasmoconus cebuensis (Wils, 1990) : synonym of Conus cebuensis Wils, 1990
- Phasmoconus ciderryi (da Motta, 1985) : synonym of Conus (Phasmoconus) ciderryi da Motta, 1985 represented as Conus ciderryi da Motta, 1985
- Phasmoconus cinereus (Hwass in Bruguière, 1792): synonym of Conus cinereus Hwass in Bruguière, 1792
- Phasmoconus collisus (Reeve, 1849): synonym of Conus collisus Reeve, 1849
- Phasmoconus dampierensis (Coomans & Filmer, 1985): synonym of Conus dampierensis Coomans & Filmer, 1985
- Phasmoconus erythraeensis (Reeve, 1843) : synonym of Conus erythraeensis Reeve, 1843
- Phasmoconus gilvus (Reeve, 1849) : synonym of Conus gilvus Reeve, 1849
- Phasmoconus giorossii (Bozzetti, 2005) : synonym of Conus giorossii Bozzetti, 2005
- Phasmoconus goudeyi Monnier & Limpalaër, 2012: synonym of Conus goudeyi (Monnier & Limpalaër, 2012)
- Phasmoconus grangeri (G.B. Sowerby III, 1900): synonym of Conus grangeri G. B. Sowerby III, 1900
- Phasmoconus habui (Lan, 2002): synonym of Conus habui Lan, 2002
- Phasmoconus jickelii (Weinkauff, 1873): synonym of Conus jickelii Weinkauff, 1873
- Phasmoconus kanakinus (Richard, 1983): synonym of Conus kanakinus Richard, 1983
- Phasmoconus kiicumulus (Azuma, 1982) : synonym of Conus kiicumulus (Azuma, 1982)
- Phasmoconus laterculatus (G. B. Sowerby II, 1870) : synonym of Conus (Phasmoconus) laterculatus G. B. Sowerby II, 1870 represented as Conus laterculatus G. B. Sowerby II, 1870
- Phasmoconus leobrerai (da Motta & Martin, 1982): synonym of Conus leobrerai da Motta & Martin, 1982
- Phasmoconus lizardensis (Crosse, 1865): synonym of Conus lizardensis Crosse, 1865
- Phasmoconus marielae (Rehder & Wilson, 1975) : synonym of Conus (Phasmoconus) marielae Rehder & Wilson, 1975 represented as Conus marielae Rehder & Wilson, 1975
- Phasmoconus martinianus (Reeve, 1844) : synonym of Conus (Phasmoconus) martinianus Reeve, 1844 represented as Conus martinianus Reeve, 1844
- Phasmoconus merleti (Mayissian, 1974): synonym of Conus merleti Mayissian, 1974
- Phasmoconus moluccensis (Küster, 1838) : synonym of Conus (Phasmoconus) moluccensis Küster, 1838 represented as Conus moluccensis Küster, 1838
- Phasmoconus mucronatus (Reeve, 1843): synonym of Conus mucronatus Reeve, 1843
- Phasmoconus niederhoeferi Monnier, Limpalaër & Lorenz, 2012: synonym of Conus (Phasmoconus) niederhoeferi (Monnier, Limpalaër & Lorenz, 2012) represented as Conus niederhoeferi (Monnier, Limpalaër & Lorenz, 2012)
- Phasmoconus parius (Reeve, 1844): synonym of Conus parius Reeve, 1844
- Phasmoconus proximus (G. B. Sowerby II, 1860) : synonym of Conus (Phasmoconus) proximus G. B. Sowerby II, 1860 represented as Conus proximus G. B. Sowerby II, 1860
- Phasmoconus radiatus (Gmelin, 1791): synonym of Conus radiatus Gmelin, 1791
- Phasmoconus rolani (Röckel, 1986): synonym of Conus rolani Röckel, 1986
- Phasmoconus salzmanni G. Raubaudi-Massilia & Rolan, 1997: synonym of Conus salzmanni G. Raybaudi-Massilia & Rolán, 1997
- Phasmoconus santinii Monnier & Limpalaër, 2014 : synonym of Conus (Phasmoconus) santinii (Monnier & Limpalaër, 2014) represented as Conus santinii (Monnier & Limpalaër, 2014)
- Phasmoconus sartii (Korn, Niederhöfer & Blöcher, 2002) : synonym of Conus (Phasmoconus) sartii Korn, Niederhöfer & Blöcher, 2002 represented as Conus sartii Korn, Niederhöfer & Blöcher, 2002
- Phasmoconus scalptus (Reeve, 1843): synonym of Conus scalptus Reeve, 1843
- Phasmoconus sculpturatus (Röckel & da Motta, 1986): synonym of Conus sculpturatus Röckel & da Motta, 1986
- Phasmoconus sertacinctus (Röckel, 1986): synonym of Conus sertacinctus Röckel, 1986
- Phasmoconus sogodensis Poppe, Monnier & Tagaro, 2012: synonym of Conus (Phasmoconus) sogodensis (Poppe, Monnier & Tagaro, 2012) represented as Conus sogodensis (Poppe, Monnier & Tagaro, 2012)
- Phasmoconus solomonensis (Delsaerdt, 1992): synonym of Conus solomonensis Delsaerdt, 1992
- Phasmoconus stramineus (Lamarck, 1810): synonym of Conus stramineus Lamarck, 1810
- Phasmoconus subulatus (Kiener, 1845): synonym of Conus subulatus Kiener, 1845 (nomen dubium)
- Phasmoconus sutanorcum (Moolenbeek, Röckel & Bouchet, 2008): synonym of Conus sutanorcum Moolenbeek, Röckel & Bouchet, 2008
- Phasmoconus vappereaui (Monteiro, 2009): synonym of Conus vappereaui Monteiro, 2009
- Phasmoconus (Phasmoconus) vegaluzi Monnier, Prugnaud & Limpalaër, 2020: synonym of Phasmoconus vegaluzi Monnier, Prugnaud & Limpalaër, 2020: synonym of Conus vegaluzi (Monnier, Prugnaud, Limpalaër, 2020)
- Phasmoconus yemenensis (Bondarev, 1997): synonym of Conus yemenensis Bondarev, 1997
- Phasmoconus zandbergeni (Filmer & Moolenbeek, 2010) : synonym of Conus (Phasmoconus) zandbergeni Filmer & Moolenbeek, 2010 represented as Conus zandbergeni Filmer & Moolenbeek, 2010
- Phasmoconus zapatosensis (Röckel, 1987): synonym of Conus zapatosensis Röckel, 1987
- Phasmoconus zebra (Lamarck, 1810): synonym of Conus zebra Lamarck, 1810
