= C. asiaticus =

C. asiaticus may refer to:

- Caprimulgus asiaticus, a nightjar species
- Charadrius asiaticus, a wader species
- Cinnyris asiaticus, a sunbird species
- Conus asiaticus, a snail species

== See also ==
- Asiaticus (disambiguation)
