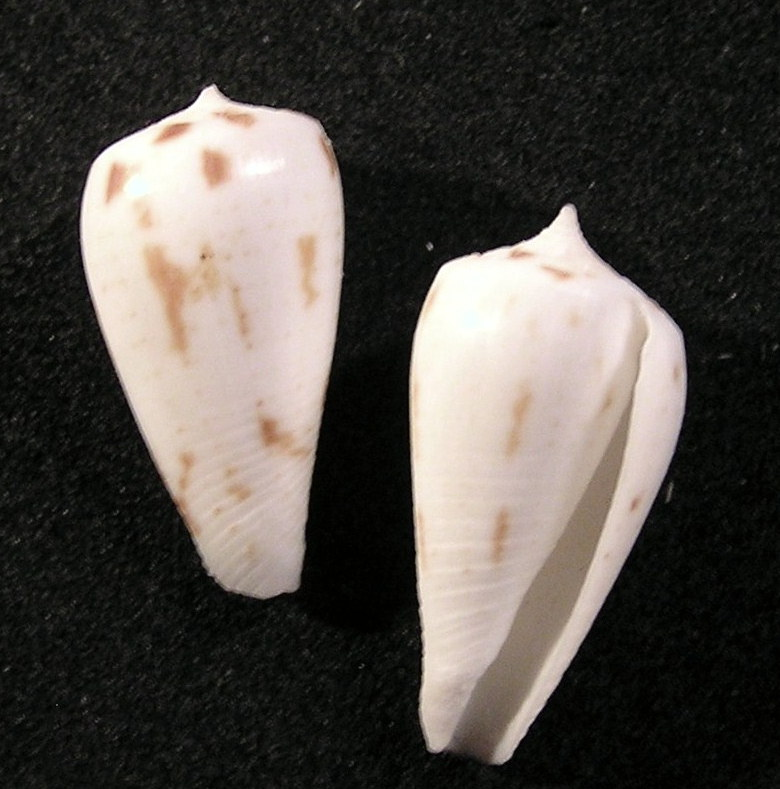
- Two views of a shell of Conus pica

Scientific classification
- Kingdom: Animalia
- Phylum: Mollusca
- Class: Gastropoda
- Subclass: Caenogastropoda
- Order: Neogastropoda
- Superfamily: Conoidea
- Family: Conidae
- Genus: Conus
- Species: C. pica

Binomial name
- Conus pica A. Adams & Reeve, 1848

Synonyms
- Conus (Phasmoconus) pica A. Adams & Reeve, 1848 · accepted, alternate representation; Conus dolium Boivin, 1864; Graphiconus pica (A. Adams & Reeve, 1848)

= Conus pica =

Species of sea snail

Conus pica is a species of sea snail, a marine gastropod mollusk in the family Conidae, the cone snails and their allies.

Like all species within the genus Conus, these snails are predatory and venomous. They are capable of stinging humans, therefore live ones should be handled carefully or not at all.

== Description ==
The size of the shell varies between 23 mm and 52 mm. Its appearance closely resembles Conus spectrum and was therefore considered by G.W. Tryon a synonym of this species.

== Distribution ==
This marine species occurs off the Philippines, Northeast Borneo and Northeast Indonesia.
