= C. moluccensis =

C. moluccensis may refer to:

- Cacatua moluccensis, the salmon-crested cockatoo or Moluccan cockatoo, a parrot species endemic to south Moluccas in eastern Indonesia
- Centrophorus moluccensis, the smallfin gulper shark, a deepwater shark species
- Conus moluccensis, a sea snail species

== See also ==
- Moluccensis
