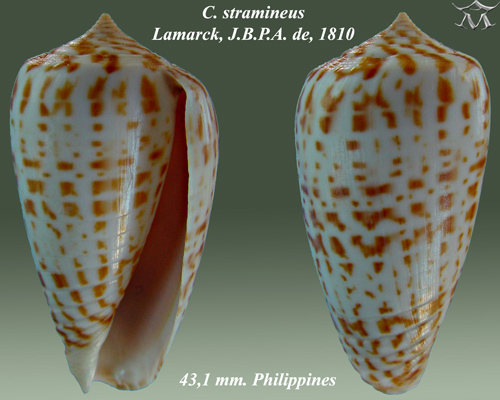
- Apertural and abapertural views of shell of Conus stramineus Lamarck, J.B.P.A. de, 1810
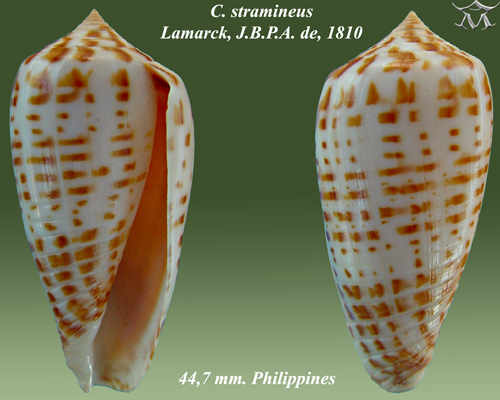

Scientific classification
- Kingdom: Animalia
- Phylum: Mollusca
- Class: Gastropoda
- Subclass: Caenogastropoda
- Order: Neogastropoda
- Superfamily: Conoidea
- Family: Conidae
- Genus: Conus
- Species: C. stramineus

Binomial name
- Conus stramineus Lamarck, 1810

Synonyms
- Asprella stramineus Lamarck, 1810; Conus (Phasmoconus) stramineus Lamarck, 1810 · accepted, alternate representation; Conus alveolus G. B. Sowerby I, 1833; Conus fuscomaculatus E. A. Smith, 1877; Conus stramineus alveolus G. B. Sowerby I, 1833; Conus subulatus Kiener, 1847 (nomen dubium); Phasmoconus stramineus (Lamarck, 1810)

= Conus stramineus =

Species of sea snail

Conus stramineus, common name the Nisus cone, is a species of sea snail, a marine gastropod mollusk in the family Conidae, the cone snails and their allies.

Like all species within the genus Conus, these snails are predatory and venomous. They are capable of stinging humans, therefore live ones should be handled carefully or not at all.

Subspecies

- Conus stramineus alveolus G. B. Sowerby I, 1833: synonym of Conus stramineus Lamarck, 1810
- Conus stramineus amplus Röckel & Korn, 1992: synonym of Conus amplus Röckel & Korn, 1992
- Conus stramineus stigmaticus A. Adams, 1855: synonym of Conus collisus Reeve, 1849

== Description ==
Conus stramineus is a medium to large sized (30–50 mm in length) conical shell. The shoulder is subangulate and smooth. The body whorl is almost straight in outline only slightly curved in towards the shoulder. It is shiny and cream to off-white with 12-14 spiral rows of squarish brown spots and blotches.

== Distribution ==
Conus stramineus appears to be restricted to Indonesia, it has been reported from the Moluccas and is relatively common off the South West coast of Java.
