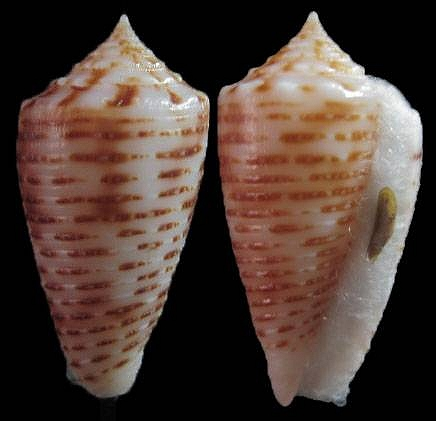

Scientific classification
- Kingdom: Animalia
- Phylum: Mollusca
- Class: Gastropoda
- Subclass: Caenogastropoda
- Order: Neogastropoda
- Superfamily: Conoidea
- Family: Conidae
- Genus: Conus
- Species: C. proximus

Binomial name
- Conus proximus G. B. Sowerby II, 1859

Synonyms
- Conus (Phasmoconus) proximus G. B. Sowerby II, 1860 · accepted, alternate representation; Conus proximus cebuensis Wils, 1990; Conus pulcher A. Adams, 1855, not [Lightfoot]; Phasmoconus proximus (G.B. Sowerby II, 1860); Textilia proxima (G.B. Sowerby II, 1860)

= Conus proximus =

Species of sea snail

Conus proximus, common name the proximus cone, is a species of sea snail, a marine gastropod mollusk in the family Conidae, the cone snails and their allies.

Like all species within the genus Conus, these snails are predatory and venomous. They are capable of stinging humans, therefore live ones should be handled carefully or not at all.

The subspecies Conus proximus cebuensis Wils, 1990 has become a synonym of Conus cebuensis Wils, 1990

== Description ==
The size of the shell varies between 22 mm and 45 mm. The shell is coronated. Its color is yellowish white, marbled and streaked with chestnut, with minute revolving lines of granules which are often somewhat articulated red-brown and white.

== Distribution ==
This marine species occurs in the Indo-Pacific Region: the Philippines; New Guinea, New Caledonia, Vanuatu the Solomon Islands and Fiji.
