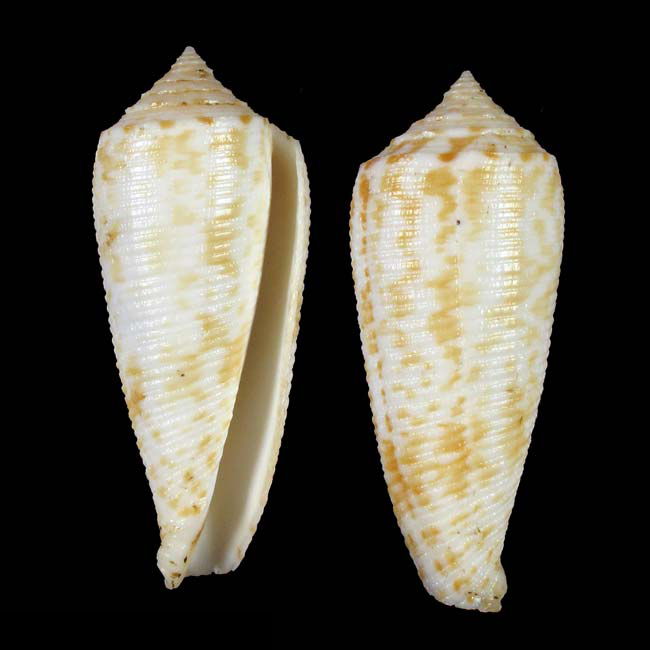
- Shell of Conus sogodensis

Scientific classification
- Kingdom: Animalia
- Phylum: Mollusca
- Class: Gastropoda
- Subclass: Caenogastropoda
- Order: Neogastropoda
- Superfamily: Conoidea
- Family: Conidae
- Genus: Conus
- Species: C. sogodensis

Binomial name
- Conus sogodensis (Poppe, Monnier & Tagaro, 2012)

Synonyms
- Conus (Phasmoconus) sogodensis (Poppe, Monnier & Tagaro, 2012) · accepted, alternate representation; Graphiconus laterculatus var. sogodensis Poppe, Monnier & Tagaro, 2012; Phasmoconus sogodensis Poppe, Monnier & Tagaro, 2012

= Conus sogodensis =

Species of sea snail

Conus sogodensis is a species of sea snail, a marine gastropod mollusc in the family Conidae, the cone snails, cone shells or cones.

These snails are predatory and venomous. They are capable of stinging humans.

== Description ==
The size of the shell varies between 44 mm and 62 mm.

== Distribution ==
This marine species occurs off the Philippines.
