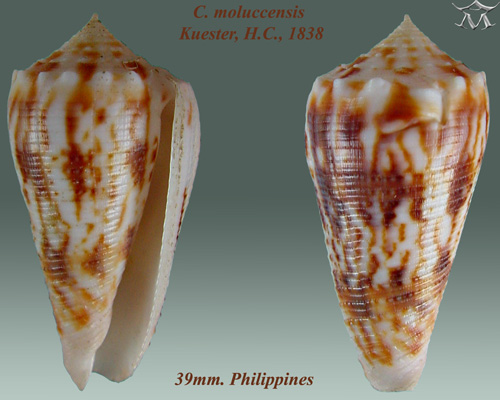
- Apertural and abapertural views of shell of Conus moluccensis Kuester, H.C., 1838
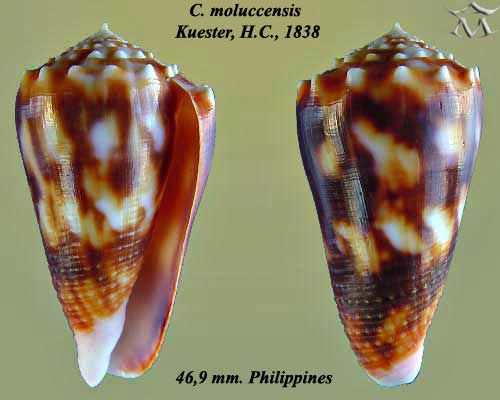

Scientific classification
- Domain: Eukaryota
- Kingdom: Animalia
- Phylum: Mollusca
- Class: Gastropoda
- Subclass: Caenogastropoda
- Order: Neogastropoda
- Superfamily: Conoidea
- Family: Conidae
- Genus: Conus
- Species: C. moluccensis

Binomial name
- Conus moluccensis Küster, 1838

Synonyms
- Conus (Phasmoconus) moluccensis Küster, 1838 · accepted, alternate representation; Conus grondini Larue, 1995 (unavailable name: proposed conditionally); Conus merleti Mayissian, 1974; Conus moluccensis f. merleti Mayissian, 1974 (unavailable name: infrasubspecific rank); Conus moluccensis moluccensis Küster, 1838; Conus stainforthii Reeve, 1843; Fulgiconus moluccensis (Küster, 1838); Fulgiconus moluccensis f. merleti (Mayissian, 1974) (unavailable name: infrasubspecific rank); Phasmoconus merleti (Mayissian, 1974); Phasmoconus moluccensis (Küster, 1838)

= Conus moluccensis =

Species of sea snail

Conus moluccensis, common name the Molucca cone, is a species of sea snail, a marine gastropod mollusk in the family Conidae, the cone snails and their allies.

Like all species within the genus Conus, these snails are predatory and venomous. They are capable of stinging humans, therefore live ones should be handled carefully or not at all.

== Subspecies ==
- Conus moluccensis marielae Rehder & Wilson, 1975: synonym of Conus marielae Rehder & Wilson, 1975
- Conus moluccensis moluccensis Küster, 1838: synonym of Conus moluccensis Küster, 1838
- Conus moluccensis vappereaui Monteiro, 2009: synonym of Conus vappereaui Monteiro, 2009

== Description ==
The size of an adult shell varies between 30 mm and 60 mm. The coronated shell is yellowish white, marbled and streaked with chestnut, with minute revolving lines of granules, which are often somewhat articulated red-brown and white.

== Distribution ==
This species occurs in the Indian Ocean off the Mascarene Basin; off Fiji, Indo-China, Indonesia, Maldives, New Caledonia, Papua New Guinea, Philippines, Solomon Islands; off Australia (Queensland).
