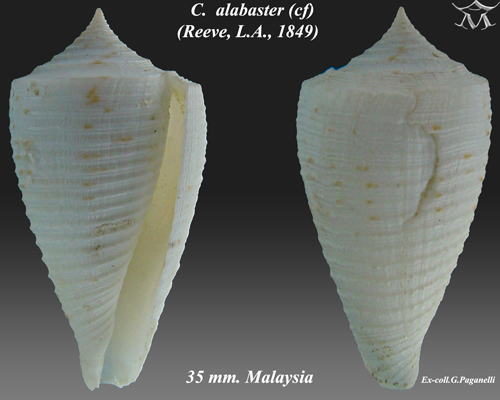
- Apertural and abapertural views of shell of Conus alabaster (Reeve, L.A., 1849)

Conservation status
- Data Deficient (IUCN 3.1)

Scientific classification
- Kingdom: Animalia
- Phylum: Mollusca
- Class: Gastropoda
- Subclass: Caenogastropoda
- Order: Neogastropoda
- Superfamily: Conoidea
- Family: Conidae
- Genus: Conus
- Species: C. alabaster

Binomial name
- Conus alabaster Reeve, 1849

Synonyms
- Conus (Phasmoconus) alabaster Reeve, 1849 accepted, alternate representation; Phasmoconus alabaster (Reeve, 1849)

= Conus alabaster =

Species of sea snail

Conus alabaster is a species of sea snail, a marine gastropod mollusk in the family Conidae, the cone snails and their allies.

Like all species within the genus Conus, these snails are predatory and venomous. They are capable of stinging humans, therefore live ones should be handled carefully or not at all.

== Description ==
The size of the shell varies between 27 mm and 41 mm.

== Distribution ==
This marine species occurs in the China Sea; off Western Indonesia and the Philippines.
