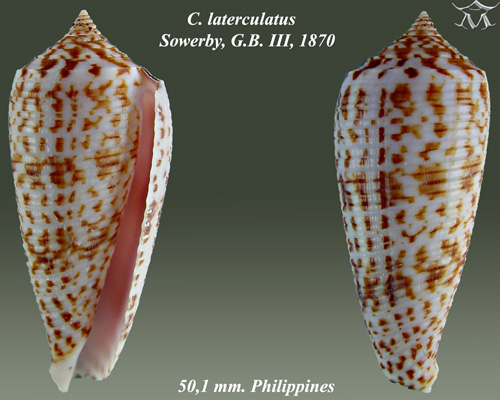
- Apertural and abapertural views of shell of Conus laterculatus Sowerby, G.B. II, 1870
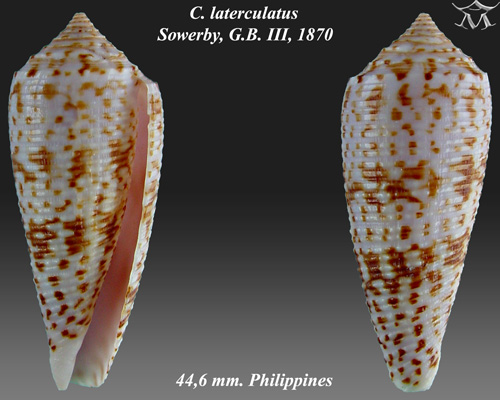

Conservation status
- Least Concern (IUCN 3.1)

Scientific classification
- Kingdom: Animalia
- Phylum: Mollusca
- Class: Gastropoda
- Subclass: Caenogastropoda
- Order: Neogastropoda
- Superfamily: Conoidea
- Family: Conidae
- Genus: Conus
- Species: C. laterculatus

Binomial name
- Conus laterculatus G. B. Sowerby II, 1870

Synonyms
- Asprella laterculata (G.B. Sowerby II, 1870); Conus (Phasmoconus) laterculatus G.B. Sowerby II, 1870 accepted, alternate representation; Graphiconus laterculatus (G. B. Sowerby II, 1870) ·; Phasmoconus laterculatus (G. B. Sowerby II, 1870)

= Conus laterculatus =

Species of mollusc

Conus laterculatus is a species of sea snail, a marine gastropod mollusk in the family Conidae, the cone snails and their allies.

Like all species with the superfamily Conoidea, these snails are predatory and venomous. They are capable of "stinging" humans; therefore, live ones should be handled carefully or not at all.

== Description ==
The size of an adult shell varies between 33 mm and 64 mm.

The shell is distantly channeled throughout, the interstices usually plane, sometimes minutely granular. The channels are narrow, longitudinally striated. The spire is much elevated, acuminated, striate, sometimes obscurely minutely coronated. The color of the shell is yellowish brown, with light chestnut longitudinal short irregular lines, and clouds of the same color forming three obscure interrupted bands.

== Distribution ==
This marine species is found off the Philippines, Borneo and Vietnam.
