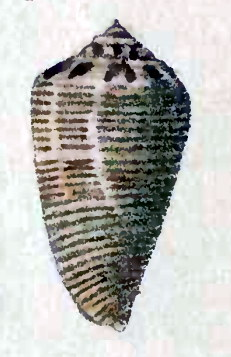
- Drawing of a shell of Conus scalptus

Conservation status
- Data Deficient (IUCN 3.1)

Scientific classification
- Kingdom: Animalia
- Phylum: Mollusca
- Class: Gastropoda
- Subclass: Caenogastropoda
- Order: Neogastropoda
- Superfamily: Conoidea
- Family: Conidae
- Genus: Conus
- Species: C. scalptus

Binomial name
- Conus scalptus Reeve, 1843

Synonyms
- Conus (Phasmoconus) scalptus Reeve, 1843 · accepted, alternate representation; Phasmoconus scalptus (Reeve, 1843)

= Conus scalptus =

Species of sea snail

Conus scalptus is a species of sea snail, a marine gastropod mollusk in the family Conidae, the cone snails and their allies.

Like all species within the genus Conus, these snails are predatory and venomous. They are capable of stinging humans, therefore live ones should be handled carefully or not at all.

== Description ==
Conus scalptus is a small (16–45 mm) and has a medium weight. The shell is turbinated with convex sides, rather solid, polished, grooved towards the base. Its color is whitish, with numerous hair-like, light brown, revolving lines. The protoconch is dirty white. The spire is spirally striated, rather elevated, with a sharp apex. Its color is variegated with chestnut. There are 6-7 post nuclear whorls with 2-4 incised spiral grooves on the inner side of each whorl.

== Distribution ==
Most true Conus scalptus appear to be from the Philippines, designated as type locality by Filmer (2011).; off Papua New Guinea.
