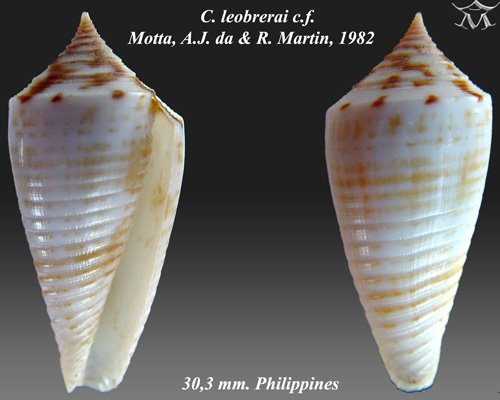
- Apertural and abapertural views of shell of Conus leobrerai Motta, A.J. da & R. Martin, 1982

Scientific classification
- Kingdom: Animalia
- Phylum: Mollusca
- Class: Gastropoda
- Subclass: Caenogastropoda
- Order: Neogastropoda
- Superfamily: Conoidea
- Family: Conidae
- Genus: Conus
- Species: C. leobrerai

Binomial name
- Conus leobrerai da Motta & Martin, 1982

Synonyms
- Conus (Phasmoconus) leobrerai da Motta & Martin, 1982 · accepted, alternate representation; Phasmoconus leobrerai (da Motta & Martin, 1982)

= Conus leobrerai =

Species of sea snail

Conus leobrerai is a species of sea snail, a marine gastropod mollusk in the family Conidae, the cone snails and their allies.

Like all species within the genus Conus, these snails are predatory and venomous. They are capable of stinging humans, therefore live ones should be handled carefully or not at all.

== Description ==
The size of the shell varies between 25 mm and 35 mm. The shell body is dextrally coiled (right-handed).

== Distribution ==
This marine species occurs off the Philippines and the Solomon Islands, living along the seafloor, shores, tidal areas, marine coral reefs, and the deep seabed.
