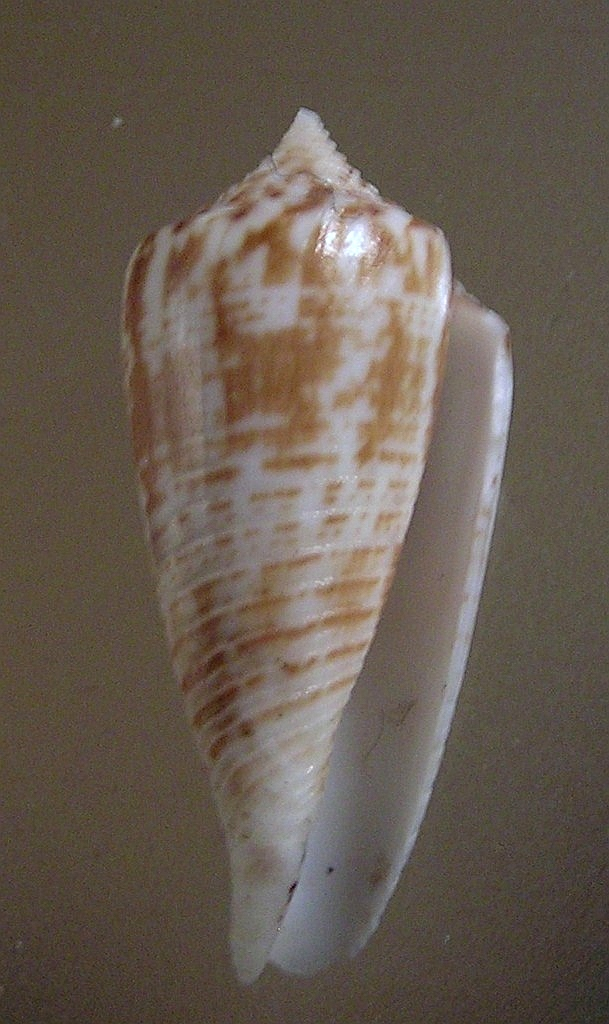
- Apertural view of Conus mucronatus

Scientific classification
- Kingdom: Animalia
- Phylum: Mollusca
- Class: Gastropoda
- Subclass: Caenogastropoda
- Order: Neogastropoda
- Superfamily: Conoidea
- Family: Conidae
- Genus: Conus
- Species: C. mucronatus

Binomial name
- Conus mucronatus Reeve, 1843

Synonyms
- Conus (Phasmoconus) mucronatus Reeve, 1843 · accepted, alternate representation; Phasmoconus mucronatus (Reeve, 1843)

= Conus mucronatus =

Species of sea snail

Conus mucronatus, common name the deep-groved cone, is a species of sea snail, a marine gastropod mollusk in the family Conidae, the cone snails and their allies.

Like all species within the genus Conus, these snails are predatory and venomous. They are capable of stinging humans, therefore live ones should be handled carefully or not at all.

Subspecies

- Conus mucronatus mucronatus Reeve, 1843
- Conus mucronatus segondensis Fenzan, 2008

== Description ==
The size of an adult shell varies between 18 mm and 50 mm. The shell is acuminately turbinated, attenuated towards the base, with revolving grooves throughout. These grooves are crossed by revolving striae. The color of the shell is whitish, somewhat clouded with pale brown. The spire is spotted with brown.

== Distribution ==
This species occurs in the Indian Ocean off the Mascarene Basin; in the Pacific Ocean along the Philippines to Papua New Guinea, Solomon Islands, Queensland, Australia, and Vanuatu; along India and in the South China Sea.

== Gallery ==
Below are several color forms and one subspecies:

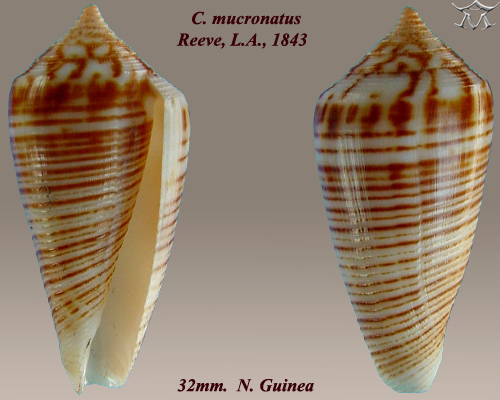
Conus mucronatus Reeve, L.A., 1843

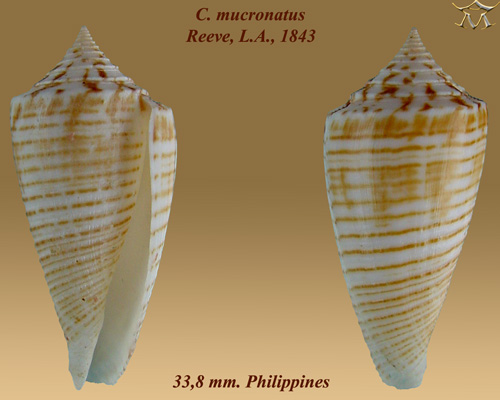
Conus mucronatus Reeve, L.A., 1843

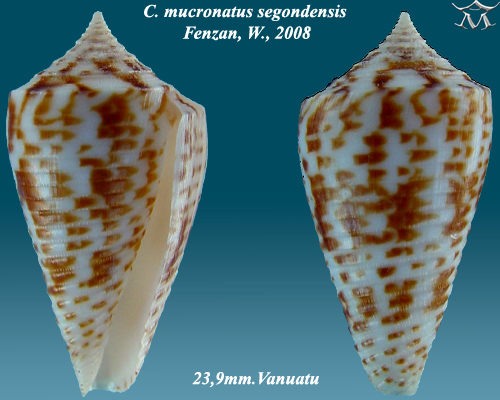
Conus mucronatus segondensis Fenzan, W., 2008
