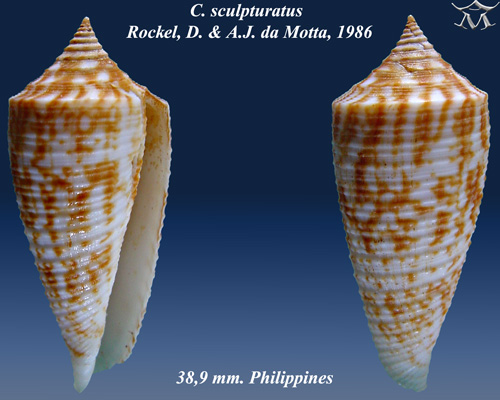
- Apertural and abapertural views of shell of Conus sculpturatus Rockel, D. & A.J. da Motta, 1986

Conservation status
- Data Deficient (IUCN 3.1)

Scientific classification
- Kingdom: Animalia
- Phylum: Mollusca
- Class: Gastropoda
- Subclass: Caenogastropoda
- Order: Neogastropoda
- Superfamily: Conoidea
- Family: Conidae
- Genus: Conus
- Species: C. sculpturatus

Binomial name
- Conus sculpturatus Röckel & da Motta, 1986

Synonyms
- Conus (Phasmoconus) sculpturatus Röckel & da Motta, 1986 · accepted, alternate representation; Phasmoconus sculpturatus (Röckel & da Motta, 1986)

= Conus sculpturatus =

Species of sea snail

Conus sculpturatus is a species of sea snail, a marine gastropod mollusk in the family Conidae, the cone snails and their allies.

Like all species within the genus Conus, these snails are predatory and venomous. They are capable of stinging humans, therefore live ones should be handled carefully or not at all.

== Description ==
The size of the shell varies between 32 mm and 44 mm.

== Distribution ==
This marine species occurs off the Philippines.
