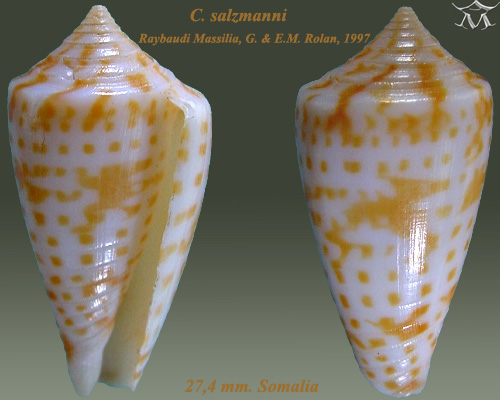
- Apertural and abapertural views of shell of Conus salzmanni Raybaudi Massilia, G. & E.M. Rolan, 1997

Scientific classification
- Kingdom: Animalia
- Phylum: Mollusca
- Class: Gastropoda
- Subclass: Caenogastropoda
- Order: Neogastropoda
- Superfamily: Conoidea
- Family: Conidae
- Genus: Conus
- Species: C. salzmanni

Binomial name
- Conus salzmanni G. Raybaudi-Massilia & Rolán, 1997

Synonyms
- Conus (Phasmoconus) salzmanni G. Raybaudi Massilia & Rolán, 1997 · accepted, alternate representation; Phasmoconus salzmanni G. Raybaudi Massilia & Rolán, 1997

= Conus salzmanni =

Species of sea snail

Conus salzmanni is a species of sea snail, a marine gastropod mollusk in the family Conidae, the cone snails and their allies.

Like all species within the genus Conus, these snails are predatory and venomous. They are capable of stinging humans, therefore live ones should be handled carefully or not at all.

== Description ==
The size of the shell varies between 20 mm and 40 mm. It has a non-planktotrophic development.

== Distribution ==
This marine species occurs in the Gulf of Aden and off Somalia.
