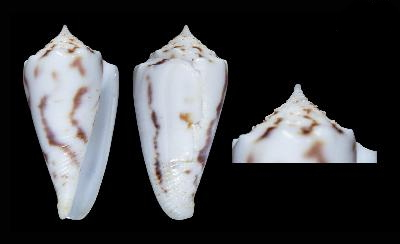
- Shell of Conus santinii (holotype in MNHN, Paris)

Scientific classification
- Kingdom: Animalia
- Phylum: Mollusca
- Class: Gastropoda
- Subclass: Caenogastropoda
- Order: Neogastropoda
- Superfamily: Conoidea
- Family: Conidae
- Genus: Conus
- Species: C. santinii

Binomial name
- Conus santinii (Monnier & Limpalaër, 2014)

Synonyms
- Conus (Phasmoconus) santinii (Monnier & Limpalaër, 2014) · accepted, alternate representation; Phasmoconus (Fulgiconus) santinii Monnier & Limpalaër, 2014 (basionym); Phasmoconus santinii Monnier & Limpalaër, 2014

= Conus santinii =

Species of Gastropoda

Conus santinii is a species of sea snail, a marine gastropod mollusc in the family Conidae, the cone snails, cone shells or cones.

These snails are predatory and venomous. They are capable of stinging humans.

== Description ==
The size of the shell varies between 21 mm and 30 mm.

== Distribution ==
This marine species occurs in the Pacific Ocean and is endemic to Fiji.
