= Conus gilvus =

Conservation status
- Least Concern (IUCN 3.1)

Scientific classification
- Kingdom: Animalia
- Phylum: Mollusca
- Class: Gastropoda
- Subclass: Caenogastropoda
- Order: Neogastropoda
- Superfamily: Conoidea
- Family: Conidae
- Genus: Conus
- Species: C. gilvus

Binomial name
- Conus gilvus Reeve, 1849

Synonyms
- Conus (Phasmoconus) gilvus Reeve, 1849 accepted, alternate representation; Phasmoconus gilvus (Reeve, 1849)

Species of sea snail

Conus gilvus is a species of sea snail, a marine gastropod mollusk in the family Conidae, the cone snails, cone shells or cones.

These snails are predatory and venomous. They are capable of stinging humans.

The epithet "gilvus" is a Latin word meaning "pale yellow".

== Description ==
The size of the shell varies between 24 mm and 38 mm.

== Distribution ==
This marine species occurs off New Guinea, the Solomon Islands and off Indonesia.
