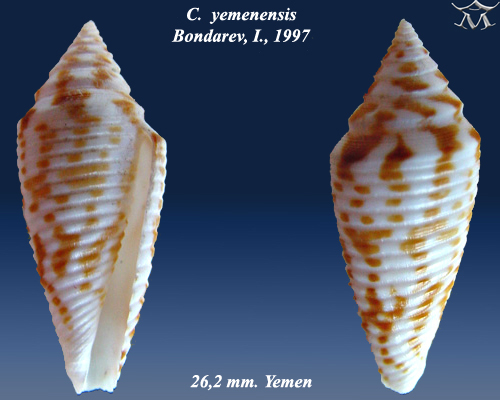
- Apertural and abapertural views of shell of Conus yemenensis Bondarev, I., 1997

Scientific classification
- Kingdom: Animalia
- Phylum: Mollusca
- Class: Gastropoda
- Subclass: Caenogastropoda
- Order: Neogastropoda
- Superfamily: Conoidea
- Family: Conidae
- Genus: Conus
- Species: C. yemenensis

Binomial name
- Conus yemenensis Bondarev, 1997

Synonyms
- Conus (Phasmoconus) yemenensis Bondarev, 1997 · accepted, alternate representation; Phasmoconus yemenensis (Bondarev, 1997)

= Conus yemenensis =

Species of sea snail

Conus yemenensis is a species of sea snail, a marine gastropod mollusk in the family Conidae, the cone snails and their allies.

Like all species within the genus Conus, these snails are predatory and venomous. They are capable of stinging humans, therefore live ones should be handled carefully or not at all.

== Distribution ==
This marine species occurs in the Gulf of Aden.
