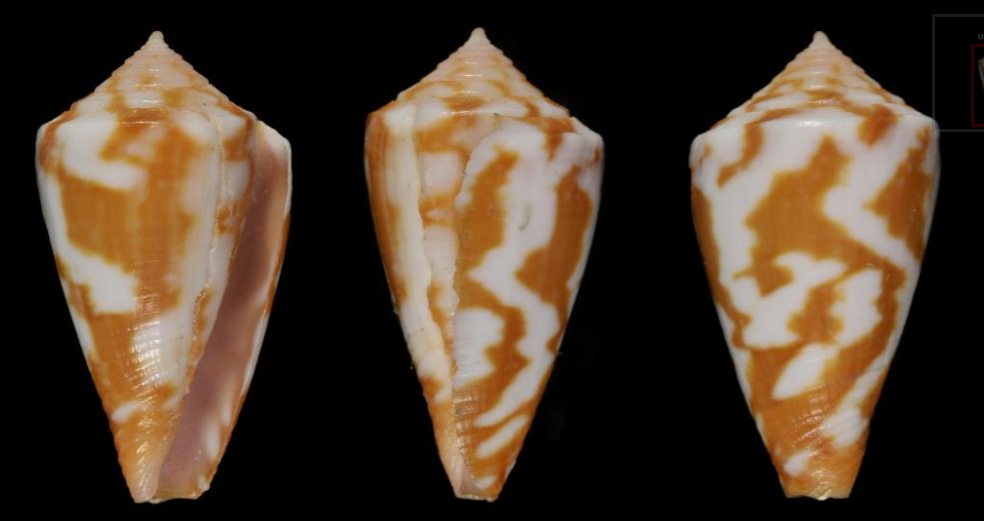
- Apertural and abapertural views of shell of Conus erythraeensis Reeve, L.A., 1843
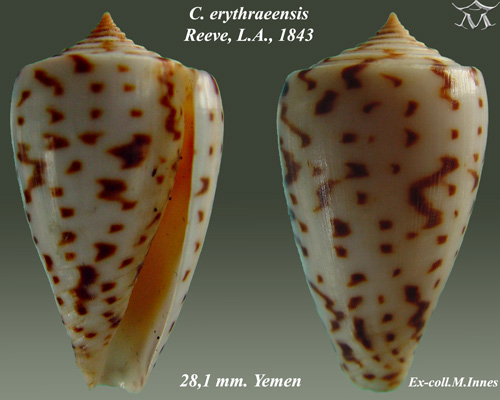

Conservation status
- Least Concern (IUCN 3.1)

Scientific classification
- Kingdom: Animalia
- Phylum: Mollusca
- Class: Gastropoda
- Subclass: Caenogastropoda
- Order: Neogastropoda
- Superfamily: Conoidea
- Family: Conidae
- Genus: Conus
- Species: C. erythraeensis

Binomial name
- Conus erythraeensis Reeve, 1843

Synonyms
- Asprella erythraeensis (Reeve, 1843); Conus adustus G. B. Sowerby II, 1858; Conus couderti Bernardi, 1860; Conus dillwynii Reeve, 1849; Conus hamilli Crosse, 1858; Conus induratus Reeve, 1849; Conus piperatus Reeve, 1844 (invalid: junior homonym of Conus piperatus Dillwyn, 1817; C. dillwynii and C. hamilli are replacement names); Conus quadratomaculatus G. B. Sowerby II, 1866; Conus (Phasmoconus) erythraeensis Reeve, 1843 · accepted, alternate representation; Phasmoconus erythraeensis (Reeve, 1843)

= Conus erythraeensis =

Species of sea snail

Conus erythraeensis, common name the Red Sea cone, is a species of sea snail, a marine gastropod mollusk in the family Conidae, the cone snails and their allies.

Like all species within the genus Conus, these snails are predatory and venomous. They are capable of stinging humans, therefore live ones should be handled carefully or not at all.

== Description ==
The size of the shell varies between 16 mm and 35 mm. The shell is small, smooth and striate below. It is yellowish white, with revolving rows of quadrangular chestnut spots, sometimes partly clouded over, so as to form bands of chestnut clouds. The spire is maculate.

== Distribution ==
This species occurs in the Red Sea and in the Northwest Indian Ocean.
