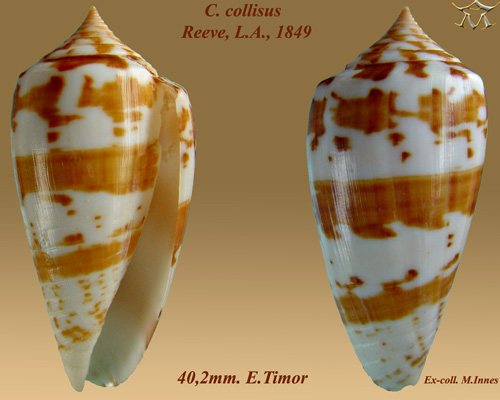
- Apertural and abapertural views of shell of Conus collisus Reeve, L.A., 1849
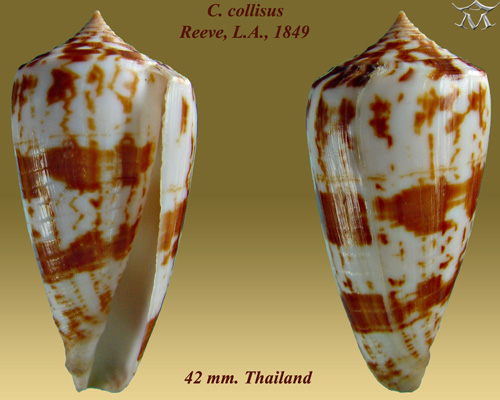

Conservation status
- Least Concern (IUCN 3.1)

Scientific classification
- Kingdom: Animalia
- Phylum: Mollusca
- Class: Gastropoda
- Subclass: Caenogastropoda
- Order: Neogastropoda
- Superfamily: Conoidea
- Family: Conidae
- Genus: Conus
- Species: C. collisus

Binomial name
- Conus collisus Reeve, 1849

Synonyms
- Conus (Phasmoconus) collisus Reeve, 1849 · accepted, alternate representation; Conus stigmaticus A. Adams, 1855; Conus stramineus stigmaticus A. Adams, 1855; Phasmoconus collisus (Reeve, 1849)

= Conus collisus =

Species of sea snail

Conus collisus, common name the stigmatic cone, is a species of sea snail, a marine gastropod mollusk in the family Conidae, the cone snails and their allies.

Like all species within the genus Conus, these snails are predatory and venomous. They are capable of stinging humans, therefore live ones should be handled carefully or not at all.

== Description ==
The size of an adult shell varies between 30 mm and 60 mm. The thin shell is cylindrically turbinated, and somewhat inflated. The lower part of the body whorl shows distant revolving grooves. The ground color of the shell is white, variously painted with chestnut longitudinal irregular streaks, usually forming three broad series or bands. It closely resembles Conus spectrum.

== Distribution ==
This species occurs in the Gulf of Bengal along South India; the Andaman Sea, Malaysia; the South China Sea, the Pacific Ocean off Indonesia and the Philippines.
