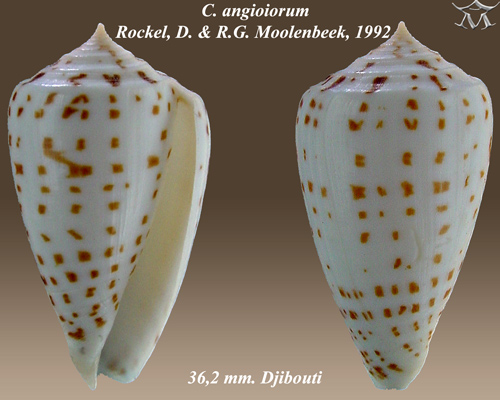
- Apertural and abapertural views of shell of Conus angioiorum Rockel, D. & R.G. Moolenbeek, 1992

Conservation status
- Data Deficient (IUCN 3.1)

Scientific classification
- Kingdom: Animalia
- Phylum: Mollusca
- Class: Gastropoda
- Subclass: Caenogastropoda
- Order: Neogastropoda
- Superfamily: Conoidea
- Family: Conidae
- Genus: Conus
- Species: C. angioiorum

Binomial name
- Conus angioiorum Röckel & Moolenbeek, 1992

Synonyms
- Conus (Phasmoconus) angioiorum Röckel & Moolenbeek, 1992 accepted, alternate representation; Phasmoconus angioiorum (Röckel & Moolenbeek, 1992)

= Conus angioiorum =

Species of sea snail

Conus angioiorum is a species of sea snail in the family Conidae (cone snails).

Like all species within the genus Conus, C. angioiorum are predatory and venomous. They are capable of injecting humans with venom, and should thus be handled carefully or avoided.

== Description ==
Members of C. angioiorum vary between 26 and 45 mm in length. Their shells are white with patterns of rectangular brown patches arranged in lines.

== Distribution ==
C. angioiorum can be found in the Indian Ocean off Somalia and Madagascar.
