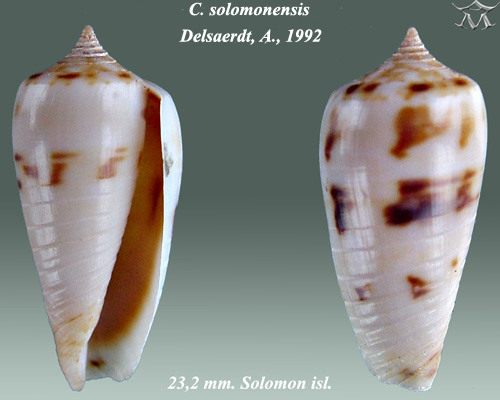
- Apertural and abapertural views of shell of Conus solomonensis Delsaerdt, A., 1992
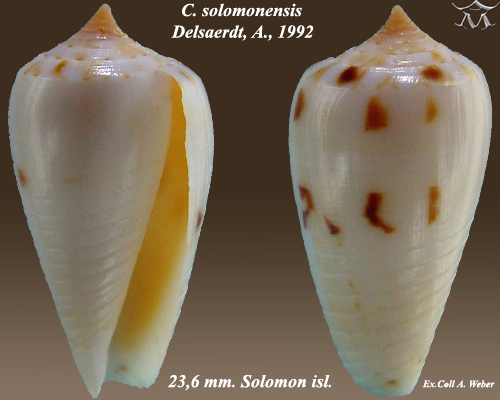

Conservation status
- Data Deficient (IUCN 3.1)

Scientific classification
- Kingdom: Animalia
- Phylum: Mollusca
- Class: Gastropoda
- Subclass: Caenogastropoda
- Order: Neogastropoda
- Superfamily: Conoidea
- Family: Conidae
- Genus: Conus
- Species: C. solomonensis

Binomial name
- Conus solomonensis Delsaerdt, 1992

Synonyms
- Asprella solomonensis Delsaerdt, 1992; Conus (Phasmoconus) solomonensis Delsaerdt, 1992 · accepted, alternate representation; Phasmoconus solomonensis (Delsaerdt, 1992)

= Conus solomonensis =

Species of sea snail

Conus solomonensis is a species of sea snail, a marine gastropod mollusk in the family Conidae, the cone snails and their allies.

Like all species within the genus Conus, these snails are predatory and venomous. They are capable of stinging humans, therefore live ones should be handled carefully or not at all.

== Description ==
The size of the shell varies between 22 mm and 40 mm.

== Distribution ==
Conus solomonensis occurs off the Solomon Islands and Papua New Guinea. The type locality is situated west of Honiara, Guadalcanal, Solomons.
