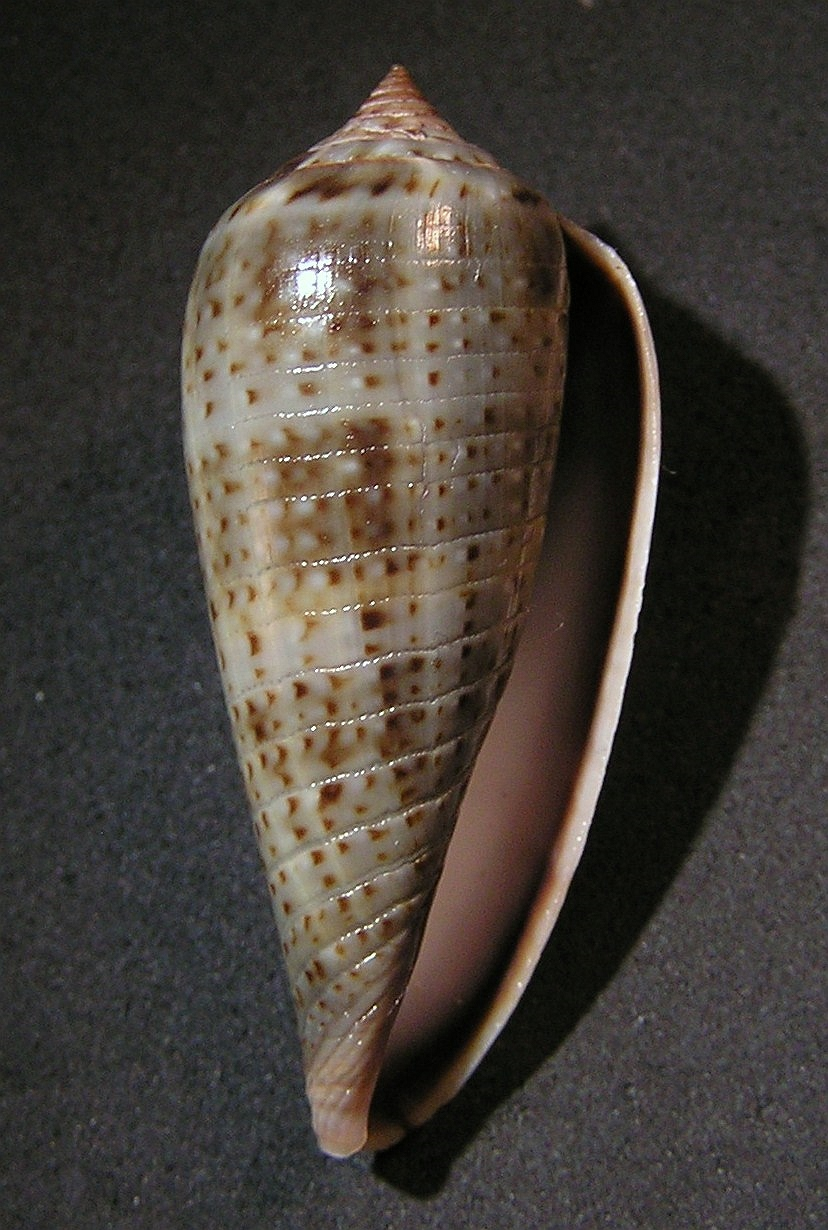
- Apertural view of Conus cinereus

Conservation status
- Least Concern (IUCN 3.1)

Scientific classification
- Kingdom: Animalia
- Phylum: Mollusca
- Class: Gastropoda
- Subclass: Caenogastropoda
- Order: Neogastropoda
- Superfamily: Conoidea
- Family: Conidae
- Genus: Conus
- Species: C. cinereus

Binomial name
- Conus cinereus Hwass in Bruguière, 1792

Synonyms
- Conus (Phasmoconus) cinereus Hwass in Bruguière, 1792 accepted, alternate representation; Conus bernardii Kiener, 1845; Conus caerulescens Lamarck, 1810; Conus exaratus Reeve, 1844; Conus gabrielii Kiener, 1845; Conus gubba Kiener, 1845 (original description); Conus nisus Dillwyn, 1817; Conus politus Weinkauff, 1875; Cucullus cinereus Röding, 1798; Cucullus clavatus Röding, 1798; Graphiconus cinereus (Hwass in Bruguière, 1792); Phasmoconus cinereus (Hwass in Bruguière, 1792)

= Conus cinereus =

Species of sea snail

Conus cinereus, common name the sunburnt cone, is a species of sea snail, a marine gastropod mollusk in the family Conidae, the cone snails and their allies.

Like all species within the genus Conus, these snails are predatory and venomous. They are capable of stinging humans.

The species Conus cinereus Schröter, 1803 is a nomen dubium.

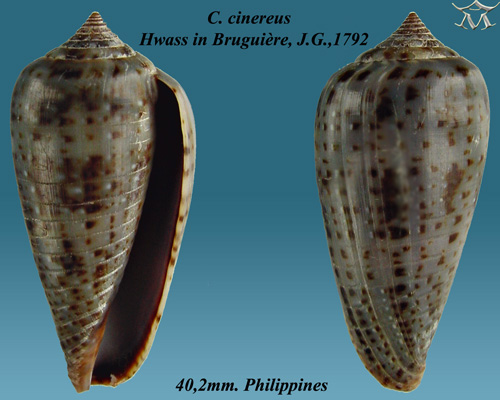
Conus cinereus Hwass in Bruguière, J.G., 1792

== Description ==
The size of an adult shell varies between 15 mm and 57 mm. The shell is cylindrically ovate, with a moderate, smooth spire. The body whorl is encircled below by distant grooves. The shell is clouded with olivaceous, ashy blue and chestnut-brown, with revolving lines articulated of chestnut and white spots. The brown-stained aperture is wider at its base than at its shoulder. Conus bernardii is a color variant. The color of its shell is fulvous chestnut, with a few scattered white spots and chestnut revolving lines.

== Distribution ==
This species occurs in the Western Pacific Ocean from Japan to Indonesia.
