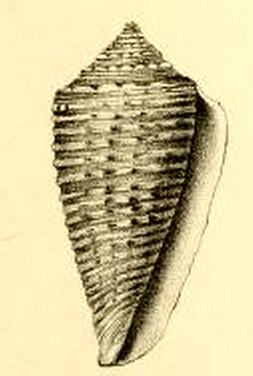
- Original drawing with an apertural view of Conus grangeri

Scientific classification
- Kingdom: Animalia
- Phylum: Mollusca
- Class: Gastropoda
- Subclass: Caenogastropoda
- Order: Neogastropoda
- Superfamily: Conoidea
- Family: Conidae
- Genus: Conus
- Species: C. grangeri

Binomial name
- Conus grangeri G. B. Sowerby III, 1900

Synonyms
- Conus (Asprella) grangeri G. B. Sowerby III, 1900 · accepted, alternate representation; Conus batheon Sturany, 1904; Phasmoconus grangeri (G. B. Sowerby III, 1900)

= Conus grangeri =

Species of sea snail

Conus grangeri, common name Granger's cone, is a species of sea snail, a marine gastropod mollusk in the family Conidae, the cone snails and their allies.

Like all species within the genus Conus, these snails are predatory and venomous. They are capable of stinging humans, therefore live ones should be handled carefully or not at all.

== Description ==
The length of their seashell varies between 31 mm and 75 mm. The diameter measures around 22 mm. The shell is elongated in shape, whitish and broadly banded with yellow. The aperture is moderately wide and white.

== Distribution ==
This marine species occurs in the Red Sea and off Sri Lanka and the Western Pacific; off the Philippines and Australia (the Northern Territory)
