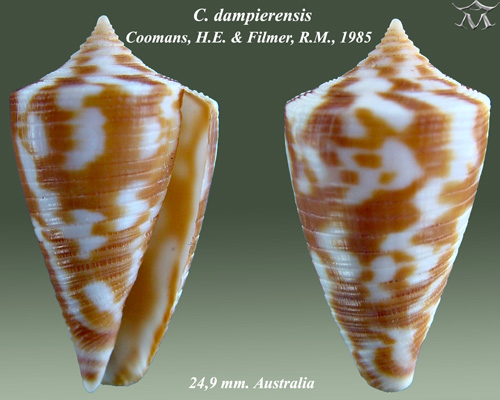
- Apertural and abapertural views of shell of Conus dampierensis Coomans, H.E. & Filmer, R.M., 1985
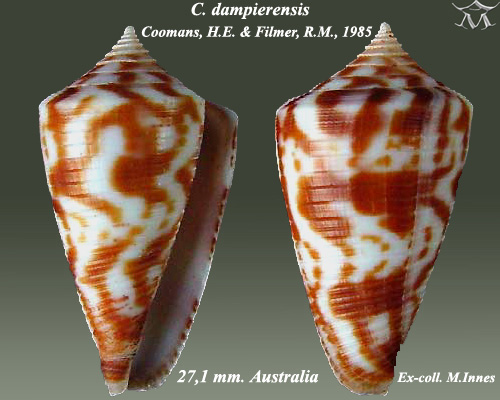

Conservation status
- Least Concern (IUCN 3.1)

Scientific classification
- Kingdom: Animalia
- Phylum: Mollusca
- Class: Gastropoda
- Subclass: Caenogastropoda
- Order: Neogastropoda
- Superfamily: Conoidea
- Family: Conidae
- Genus: Conus
- Species: C. dampierensis

Binomial name
- Conus dampierensis Coomans & Filmer, 1985

Synonyms
- Conus (Phasmoconus) dampierensis Coomans & Filmer, 1985 · accepted, alternate representation; Phasmoconus dampierensis (Coomans & Filmer, 1985)

= Conus dampierensis =

Species of sea snail

Conus dampierensis is a species of sea snail, a marine gastropod mollusk in the family Conidae, the cone snails and their allies.

Like all species within the genus Conus, these snails are predatory and venomous. They are capable of stinging humans, therefore live ones should be handled carefully or not at all.

== Description ==
The size of a shell varies between 23 mm and 34 mm.

The Color of the shell is a cream orange color with white blotches that are scattered throughout the shell. the tip of the shell is pointed instead of flat which some members of its genus have. Like all members of its genus Conus Dampierensis's shell is in a cone shape.

== Distribution ==
This marine species is endemic to Australia and occurs off Western Australia.
