= Conus giorossii =

Conservation status
- Data Deficient (IUCN 3.1)

Scientific classification
- Kingdom: Animalia
- Phylum: Mollusca
- Class: Gastropoda
- Subclass: Caenogastropoda
- Order: Neogastropoda
- Superfamily: Conoidea
- Family: Conidae
- Genus: Conus
- Species: C. giorossii

Binomial name
- Conus giorossii Bozzetti, 2005

Synonyms
- Conus (Phasmoconus) giorossii Bozzetti, 2005 · accepted, alternate representation; Phasmoconus giorossii (Bozzetti, 2005)

Species of sea snail

Conus giorossii is a species of sea snail, a marine gastropod mollusk in the family Conidae, the cone snails, cone shells or cones.

These snails are predatory and venomous. They are capable of stinging humans.

== Description ==
The length of the shell varies between 24 mm and 33 mm.

== Distribution ==
This marine species of cone snail occurs off Flores, Indonesia.
