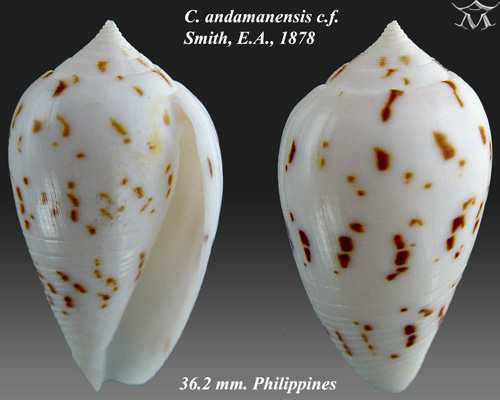
- Apertural and abapertural views of shell of Conus andamanensis Smith, E.A., 1878
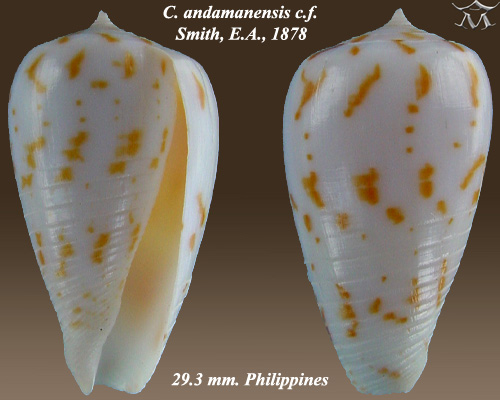

Conservation status
- Data Deficient (IUCN 3.1)

Scientific classification
- Kingdom: Animalia
- Phylum: Mollusca
- Class: Gastropoda
- Subclass: Caenogastropoda
- Order: Neogastropoda
- Superfamily: Conoidea
- Family: Conidae
- Genus: Conus
- Species: C. andamanensis

Binomial name
- Conus andamanensis E. A. Smith, 1879

Synonyms
- Asprella andamanensis (E. A. Smith, 1878); Conus (Phasmoconus) andamanensis E. A. Smith, 1878; Phasmoconus andamanensis (E. A. Smith, 1878)

= Conus andamanensis =

Species of sea snail

Conus andamanensis is a species of sea snail, a marine gastropod mollusk in the family Conidae, the cone snails and their allies.

Like all species within the genus Conus, these snails are predatory and venomous. They are capable of stinging humans, therefore live ones should be handled carefully or not at all.

== Description ==
The size of the shell varies between 16 mm and 41 mm.

== Distribution ==
This species occurs in the Andaman Sea.
