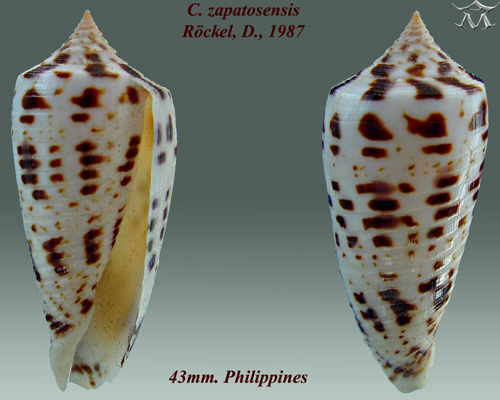
- Apertural and abapertural views of shell of Conus zapatosensis Röckel, D., 1987
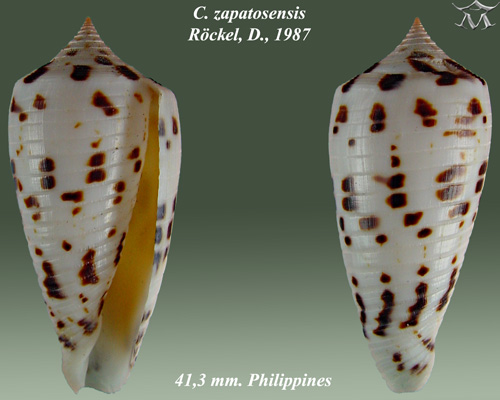

Conservation status
- Least Concern (IUCN 3.1)

Scientific classification
- Kingdom: Animalia
- Phylum: Mollusca
- Class: Gastropoda
- Subclass: Caenogastropoda
- Order: Neogastropoda
- Superfamily: Conoidea
- Family: Conidae
- Genus: Conus
- Species: C. zapatosensis

Binomial name
- Conus zapatosensis Röckel, 1987

Synonyms
- Asprella zapatosensis (Röckel, 1987); Conus (Phasmoconus) zapatosensis Röckel, 1987 · accepted, alternate representation; Phasmoconus zapatosensis (Röckel, 1987)

= Conus zapatosensis =

Species of sea snail

Conus zapatosensis is a species of sea snail, a marine gastropod mollusk in the family Conidae, the cone snails and their allies.

Like all species within the genus Conus, these snails are predatory and venomous. They are capable of stinging humans, therefore live ones should be handled carefully or not at all.

== Description ==
The size of the shell varies between 19 mm and 49 mm.

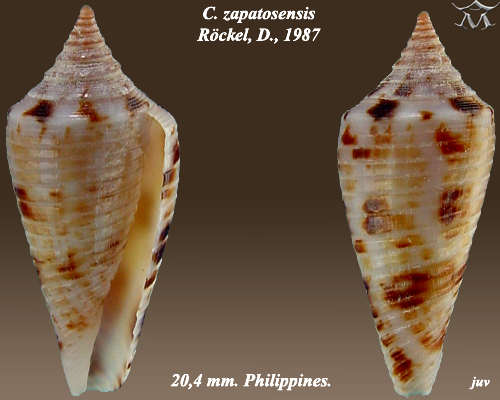
Conus zapatosensis Röckel, D., 1987 (juv.)

== Distribution ==
Conus zapatosensis is restricted to the central and southern Philippines with a dubiously reported specimen from Singapore. The type locality is situated near Zapatos Island, Negros, the Philippines. Paratypes are from Marinduque and Burias Straight.
