= Conus martinianus =

Scientific classification
- Kingdom: Animalia
- Phylum: Mollusca
- Class: Gastropoda
- Subclass: Caenogastropoda
- Order: Neogastropoda
- Superfamily: Conoidea
- Family: Conidae
- Genus: Conus
- Species: C. martinianus

Binomial name
- Conus martinianus Reeve, 1844

Synonyms
- Conus (Phasmoconus) martinianus Reeve, 1844 · accepted, alternate representation; Phasmoconus martinianus (Reeve, 1844)

Species of sea snail

Conus martinianus is a species of sea snail, a marine gastropod mollusk in the family Conidae, the cone snails, cone shells or cones.

These snails are predatory and venomous. They are capable of stinging humans.

== Description ==
The size of the shell attains 50 mm. The spire can have a regular conical shape or convex and contains 12 whorls with rather deep, punctulated striae. The smooth body whorl is obtuse at its summit and shows a small number of grooves at its base. The aperture is narrow and becomes almost imperceptibly wider at its anterior extremity, ending in a rather deep indentation. its color is uniform dark brown to lighter brown, interrupted in older specimens by narrow, longitudinal white bands.

== Distribution ==
This marine species occurs off the Philippines and off the Solomon Islands.
