= Conus sutanorcum =

Scientific classification
- Kingdom: Animalia
- Phylum: Mollusca
- Class: Gastropoda
- Subclass: Caenogastropoda
- Order: Neogastropoda
- Superfamily: Conoidea
- Family: Conidae
- Genus: Conus
- Species: C. sutanorcum

Binomial name
- Conus sutanorcum Moolenbeek, Röckel & Bouchet, 2008

Synonyms
- Conus (Phasmoconus) sutanorcum Moolenbeek, Röckel & Bouchet, 2008 · accepted, alternate representation; Phasmoconus sutanorcum (Moolenbeek, Röckel & Bouchet, 2008)

Species of sea snail

Conus sutanorcum is a species of sea snail, a marine gastropod mollusk in the family Conidae, the cone snails and their allies.

Like all species within the genus Conus, these snails are predatory and venomous. They are capable of stinging humans, therefore live ones should be handled carefully or not at all.

== Description ==
The size of the shell varies between 18 mm and 40 mm.

== Distribution ==
This species occurs in the Pacific Ocean off Fiji and Vanuatu.
