= Conus sartii =

Scientific classification
- Kingdom: Animalia
- Phylum: Mollusca
- Class: Gastropoda
- Subclass: Caenogastropoda
- Order: Neogastropoda
- Superfamily: Conoidea
- Family: Conidae
- Genus: Conus
- Species: C. sartii

Binomial name
- Conus sartii Korn, Niederhöfer & Blöcher, 2002

Synonyms
- Conus (Phasmoconus) sartii Korn, Niederhöfer & Blöcher, 2002 · accepted, alternate representation; Phasmoconus sartii (Korn, Niederhöfer & Blöcher, 2002)

Species of sea snail

Conus sartii is a species of sea snail, a marine gastropod mollusk in the family Conidae, the cone snails, cone shells or cones.

These snails are predatory and venomous. They are capable of stinging humans.

== Description ==
The size of the shell attains 25 mm.

== Distribution ==
This marine species occurs off Madagascar.
