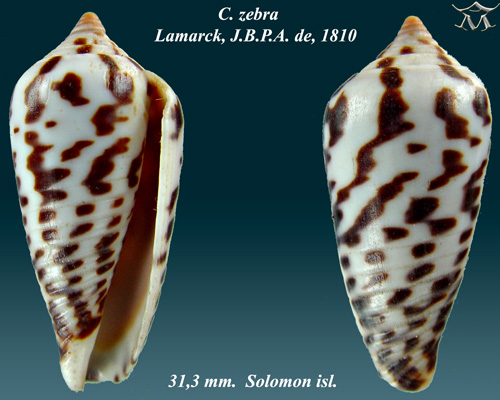
- Apertural and abapertural views of shell of Conus zebra Lamarck, J.B.P.A. de, 1810
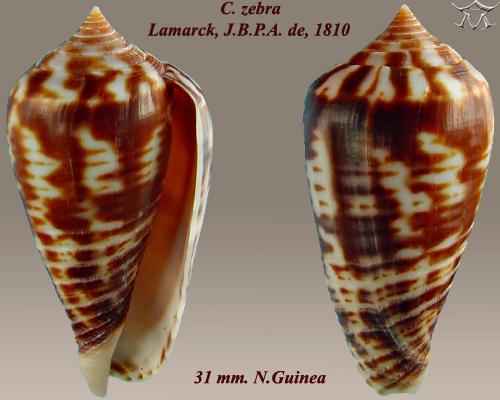

Conservation status
- Data Deficient (IUCN 3.1)

Scientific classification
- Kingdom: Animalia
- Phylum: Mollusca
- Class: Gastropoda
- Subclass: Caenogastropoda
- Order: Neogastropoda
- Superfamily: Conoidea
- Family: Conidae
- Genus: Conus
- Species: C. zebra

Binomial name
- Conus zebra Lamarck, 1810

Synonyms
- Asprella zebra (Lamarck, 1810); Conus (Phasmoconus) zebra Lamarck, 1810 · accepted, alternate representation; Conus nahoniaraensis da Motta, 1986; Phasmoconus zebra (Lamarck, 1810)

= Conus zebra =

Species of sea snail

Conus zebra is a species of sea snail, a marine gastropod mollusk in the family Conidae, the cone snails and their allies.

Like all species within the genus Conus, these snails are predatory and venomous. They are capable of stinging humans, therefore live ones should be handled carefully or not at all.

== Description ==
The size of the shell varies between 20 mm and 40 mm. The shell is cylindrically ovate, with a moderate, smooth spire. The body whorl is encircled below by distant grooves. The shell is clouded with olivaceous, ashy blue and chestnut-brown, with revolving lines articulated of chestnut and white spots. The aperture is brown-stained.

== Distribution ==
This marine species is known to occur off the Solomons, Papua New Guinea and Irian Jaya, Indonesia and off the Philippines.
