= Conus alexandrei =

Scientific classification
- Kingdom: Animalia
- Phylum: Mollusca
- Class: Gastropoda
- Subclass: Caenogastropoda
- Order: Neogastropoda
- Family: Conidae
- Genus: Conus
- Species: C. alexandrei

Binomial name
- Conus alexandrei (Limpalaër & Monnier, 2012)

Synonyms
- Phasmoconus alexandrei Limpalaër & Monnier, 2012

Species of sea snail

Conus alexandrei is a species of sea snail, a marine gastropod mollusk in the family Conidae, the cone snails, cone shells or cones.

== Taxonomy ==
This species was originally described as Phasmoconus alexandrei by Limpalaër & Monnier in 2012. Following a comprehensive molecular phylogeny and taxonomic revision of the cone snails by Puillandre et al. in 2015, the species is currently accepted under the genus Conus as Conus alexandrei.

== Description ==
The size of the shell varies between 30 mm and 46 mm.

== Distribution ==
This marine species occurs in the western Pacific Ocean, specifically off the coasts of the Philippines, Fiji, and Vanuatu.
