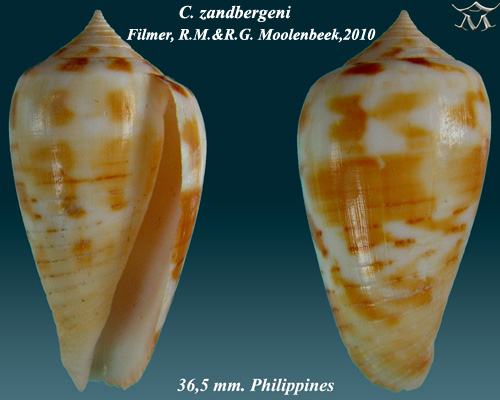
- Apertural and abapertural views of shell of Conus zandbergeni Filmer, R.M. & R.G. Moolenbeek, 2010
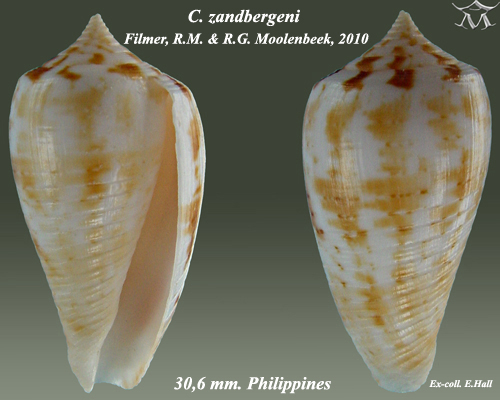

Scientific classification
- Kingdom: Animalia
- Phylum: Mollusca
- Class: Gastropoda
- Subclass: Caenogastropoda
- Order: Neogastropoda
- Superfamily: Conoidea
- Family: Conidae
- Genus: Conus
- Species: C. zandbergeni

Binomial name
- Conus zandbergeni Filmer & Moolenbeek, 2010

Synonyms
- Conus (Phasmoconus) zandbergeni Filmer & Moolenbeek, 2010 · accepted, alternate representation; Phasmoconus zandbergeni (Filmer & Moolenbeek, 2010)

= Conus zandbergeni =

Species of sea snail

Conus zandbergeni is a species of sea snail, a marine gastropod mollusc in the family Conidae, the cone snails and their allies.

Like all species within the genus Conus, these snails are predatory and venomous. They are capable of stinging humans, therefore live ones should be handled carefully or not at all.

== Description ==
The size of the shell varies between 25 mm and 45 mm.

== Distribution ==
This marine species occurs in the Indo-Pacific and is found in the Philippines, Indonesia, and the Solomon Islands.
