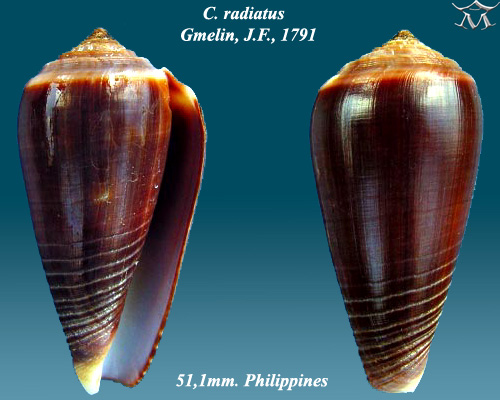
- Apertural and abapertural views of shell of Conus radiatus Gmelin, J.F., 1791
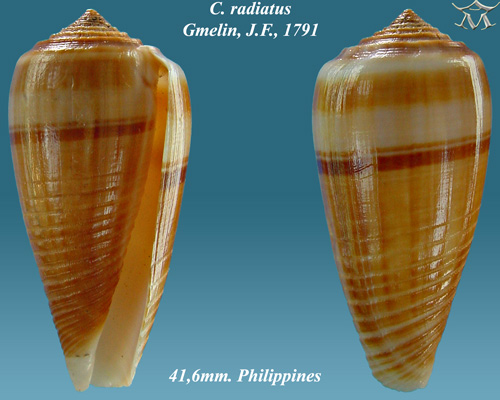

Conservation status
- Least Concern (IUCN 3.1)

Scientific classification
- Domain: Eukaryota
- Kingdom: Animalia
- Phylum: Mollusca
- Class: Gastropoda
- Subclass: Caenogastropoda
- Order: Neogastropoda
- Superfamily: Conoidea
- Family: Conidae
- Genus: Conus
- Species: C. radiatus

Binomial name
- Conus radiatus Gmelin, 1791

Synonyms
- Conus (Phasmoconus) radiatus Gmelin, 1791 · accepted, alternate representation; Phasmoconus radiatus (Gmelin, 1791); Conus martinianus Reeve, 1844

= Conus radiatus =

Species of sea snail

Conus radiatus, common name the rayed cone, is a species of sea snail, a marine gastropod mollusk in the family Conidae, the cone snails and their allies.

Like all species within the genus Conus, these snails are predatory and venomous. They are capable of stinging humans, therefore live ones should be handled carefully or not at all.

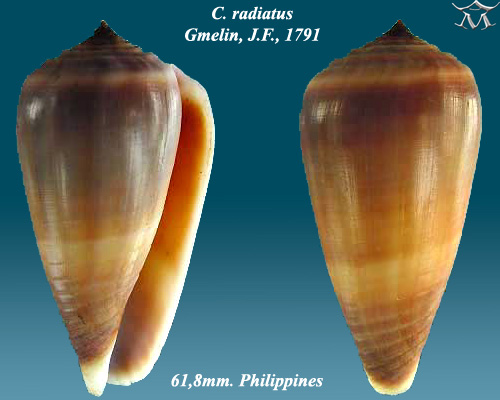
Conus radiatus Gmelin, J.F., 1791

== Description ==
The size of the shell varies between 30 mm and 109 mm. The color of the shell is pale yellowish to pale chestnut, often longitudinally indistinctly marked with deeper coloring. The spire is striate. The lower part of body whorl is distantly sulcate. The white variety is frequently covered by a smooth olivaceous epidermis.

Conantokin-C is a toxin derived from the venom of Conus radiatus.

== Distribution ==
This marine species occurs off the Philippines, New Guinea and Fiji.
