= Conus goudeyi =

Scientific classification
- Kingdom: Animalia
- Phylum: Mollusca
- Class: Gastropoda
- Subclass: Caenogastropoda
- Order: Neogastropoda
- Superfamily: Conoidea
- Family: Conidae
- Genus: Conus
- Species: C. goudeyi

Binomial name
- Conus goudeyi (Monnier & Limpalaër, 2012)

Synonyms
- Conus (Phasmoconus) goudeyi (Monnier & Limpalaër, 2012) · accepted, alternate representation; Fulgiconus goudeyi (Monnier & Limpalaër, 2012); Phasmoconus goudeyi Monnier & Limpalaër, 2012

Species of sea snail

Conus goudeyi is a species of sea snail, a marine gastropod mollusc in the family Conidae, the cone snails, cone shells or cones.

These snails are predatory and venomous. They are capable of stinging humans, due to their harpoons, made from modified radula teeth, launched from their proboscis.

== Description ==
The size of the shell varies between 30 mm and 45 mm.

The shell is white and shiny, with irregular, slightly fuzzy cross-wise barring that varies between rusty-orange and lighter orange, that spirals up slightly to the thicker end of the shell.

== Distribution ==
This marine species occurs in the ocean off New Caledonia.
