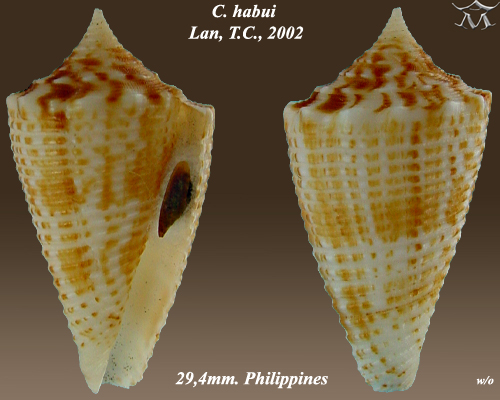
- Apertural and abapertural views of shell of Conus habui Lan, T.C., 2002

Scientific classification
- Kingdom: Animalia
- Phylum: Mollusca
- Class: Gastropoda
- Subclass: Caenogastropoda
- Order: Neogastropoda
- Superfamily: Conoidea
- Family: Conidae
- Genus: Conus
- Species: C. habui

Binomial name
- Conus habui Lan, 2002

Synonyms
- Conus (Phasmoconus) habui Lan, 2002 · accepted, alternate representation; Phasmoconus habui (Lan, 2002)

= Conus habui =

Species of sea snail

Conus habui is a species of sea snail, a marine gastropod mollusk in the family Conidae, the cone snails and their allies.

Like all species within the genus Conus, these snails are predatory and venomous. They are capable of stinging humans, therefore live ones should be handled carefully or not at all.

== Description ==
The size of the shell attains 30 mm.

== Etymology ==
The specific name "habui" honours Shingo Habu, Japanese malacologist.

== Distribution ==
This marine species occurs off Okinawa, Japan and off the Philippines
