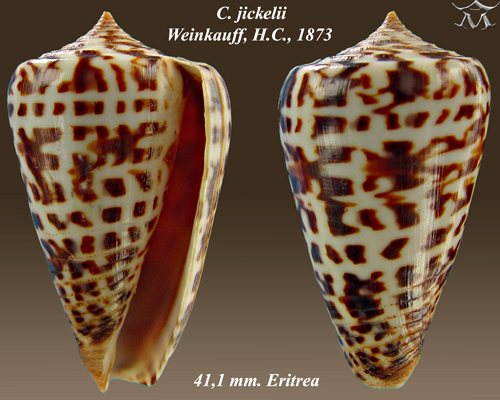
- Apertural and abapertural views of shell of Conus jickelii Weinkauff, H.C., 1873
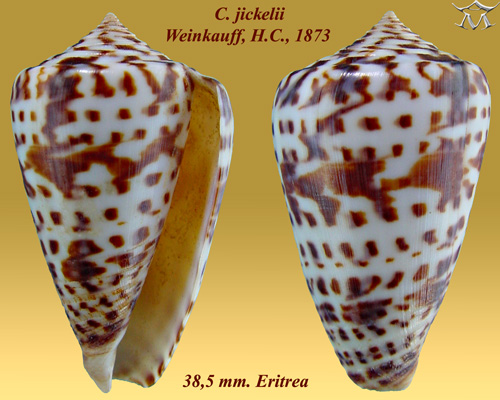

Scientific classification
- Kingdom: Animalia
- Phylum: Mollusca
- Class: Gastropoda
- Subclass: Caenogastropoda
- Order: Neogastropoda
- Superfamily: Conoidea
- Family: Conidae
- Genus: Conus
- Species: C. jickelii

Binomial name
- Conus jickelii Weinkauff, 1873

Synonyms
- Conus (Phasmoconus) jickelii Weinkauff, 1873 · accepted, alternate representation; Conus minutus Schröter, 1803 (treated by authors as a nomen oblitum); Cucullus quadratus Röding, 1798 (treated by authors as a nomen oblitum); Phasmoconus jickelii (Weinkauff, 1873)

= Conus jickelii =

Species of sea snail

Conus jickelii, common name Jickeli's cone, is a species of sea snail, a marine gastropod mollusk in the family Conidae, the cone snails and their allies.

Like all species within the genus Conus, these snails are predatory and venomous. They are capable of stinging humans, therefore live ones should be handled carefully or not at all.

== Description ==
The size of the shell varies between 33 mm and 51 mm. The white shell shows chocolate, irregular, longitudinal markings, and quadrangular spots in revolving series.

== Distribution ==
This marine species occurs in the Red Sea and in the Gulf of Aden.
