= Conus niederhoeferi =

Scientific classification
- Kingdom: Animalia
- Phylum: Mollusca
- Class: Gastropoda
- Subclass: Caenogastropoda
- Order: Neogastropoda
- Superfamily: Conoidea
- Family: Conidae
- Genus: Conus
- Species: C. niederhoeferi

Binomial name
- Conus niederhoeferi (Monnier, Limpalaër & Lorenz, 2012)

Synonyms
- Conus (Phasmoconus) niederhoeferi (Monnier, Limpalaër & Lorenz, 2012) · accepted, alternate representation; Phasmoconus niederhoeferi Monnier, Limpalaër & Lorenz, 2012

Species of sea snail

Conus niederhoeferi is a species of sea snail, a marine gastropod mollusc in the family Conidae, the cone snails, cone shells or cones.

These snails are predatory and venomous. They are capable of stinging humans.

== Description ==
The size of the shell attains 40 mm.

== Distribution ==
This marine species occurs in the East China Sea.
