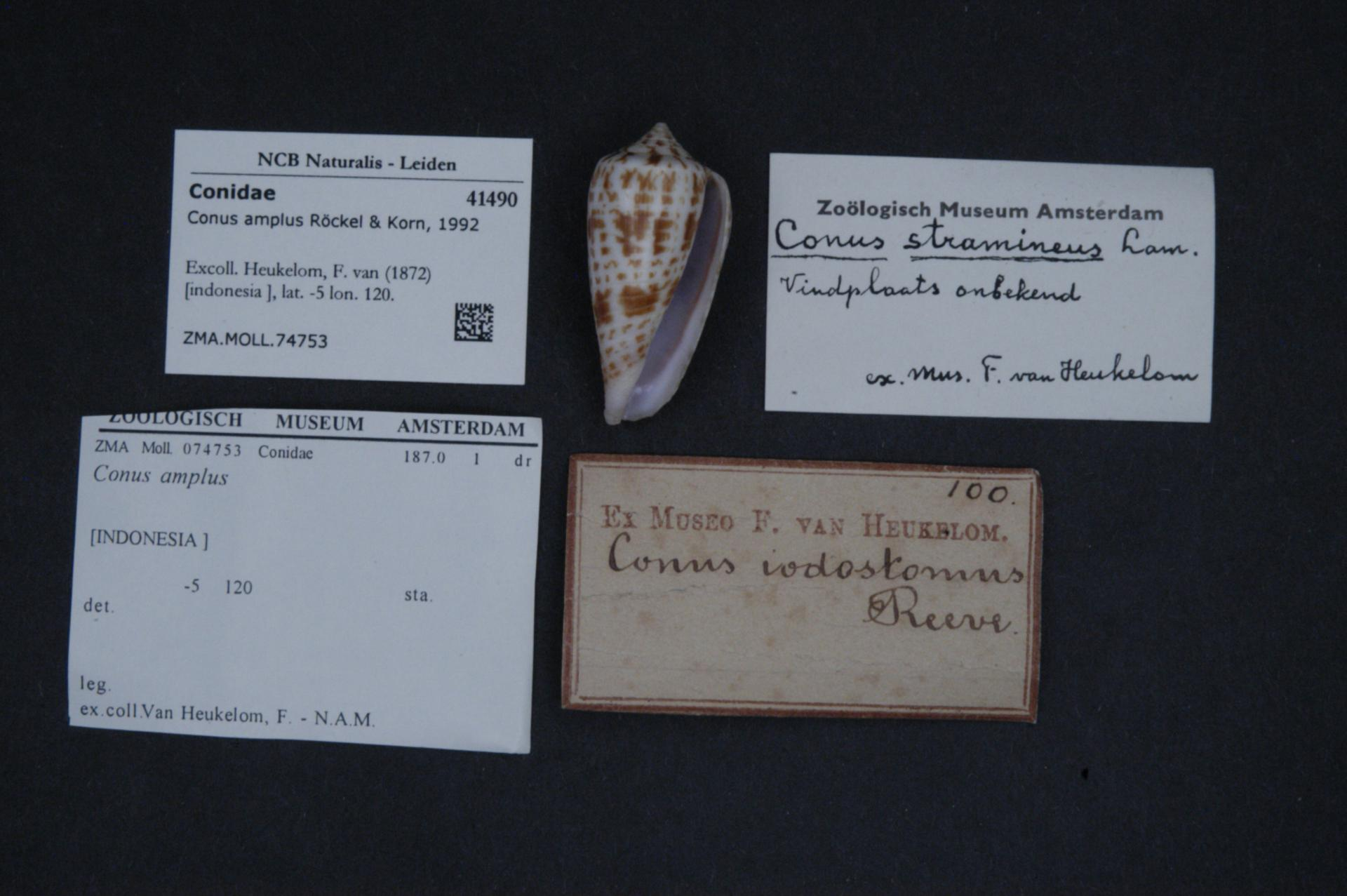

Scientific classification
- Kingdom: Animalia
- Phylum: Mollusca
- Class: Gastropoda
- Subclass: Caenogastropoda
- Order: Neogastropoda
- Superfamily: Conoidea
- Family: Conidae
- Genus: Conus
- Species: C. amplus

Binomial name
- Conus amplus Röckel & Korn, 1992

Synonyms
- Asprella amplus (Röckel & Korn, 1992); Conus (Phasmoconus) amplus Röckel & Korn, 1992 accepted, alternate representation; Conus nisus Kiener, 1845 (Invalid: junior homonym of C. nisus Dillwyn, 1817; Conus amplus is a replacement name); Conus stramineus amplus Röckel & Korn, 1992

= Conus amplus =

Species of sea snail

Conus amplus is a species of sea snail, a marine gastropod mollusk in the family Conidae, the cone snails and their allies.

Like all species within the genus Conus, these snails are predatory and venomous. They are capable of stinging humans, therefore live ones should be handled carefully or not at all.

== Description ==
The size of the shell varies between 30 mm and 50 mm.

== Distribution ==
This marine species occurs off the Philippines to India; and off the Solomon Islands.
