= Conus balabacensis =

Scientific classification
- Kingdom: Animalia
- Phylum: Mollusca
- Class: Gastropoda
- Subclass: Caenogastropoda
- Order: Neogastropoda
- Superfamily: Conoidea
- Family: Conidae
- Genus: Conus
- Species: C. balabacensis

Binomial name
- Conus balabacensis Filmer, 2012

Synonyms
- Conus (Phasmoconus) balabacensis Filmer, 2012 · accepted, alternate representation; Phasmoconus balabacensis (Filmer, 2012)

Species of sea snail

Conus balabacensis is a species of sea snail, a marine gastropod mollusc in the family Conidae, the cone snails, cone shells or cones.

These snails are predatory and venomous. They are capable of stinging humans.

== Description ==
The size of the shell varies between 15 mm and 29 mm.

== Distribution ==
This marine species occurs off Sabah, Malaysia and Palawan, Philippines
