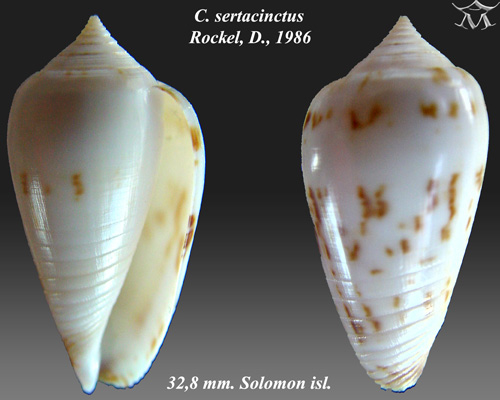
- Apertural and abapertural views of shell of Conus sertacinctus Rockel, D., 1986

Conservation status
- Least Concern (IUCN 3.1)

Scientific classification
- Kingdom: Animalia
- Phylum: Mollusca
- Class: Gastropoda
- Subclass: Caenogastropoda
- Order: Neogastropoda
- Superfamily: Conoidea
- Family: Conidae
- Genus: Conus
- Species: C. sertacinctus

Binomial name
- Conus sertacinctus Röckel, 1986

Synonyms
- Asprella sertacinctus Röckel, 1986; Conus (Phasmoconus) sertacinctus Röckel, 1986 · accepted, alternate representation; Phasmoconus sertacinctus (Röckel, 1986)

= Conus sertacinctus =

Species of sea snail

Conus sertacinctus is a species of sea snail, a marine gastropod mollusk in the family Conidae, the cone snails and their allies.

Like all species within the genus Conus, these snails are predatory and venomous. They are capable of stinging humans, therefore live ones should be handled carefully or not at all.

== Description ==
Conus sertacinctus is a small to medium-sized shell (25–35 mm) which is solid although light weight. The spire is medium in height and straight to slightly concave in outline.

== Distribution ==
Conus sertacinctus occurs off the Solomon Islands. It is not uncommon around the island of Guadalcanal.; off the Philippines and Southern India
