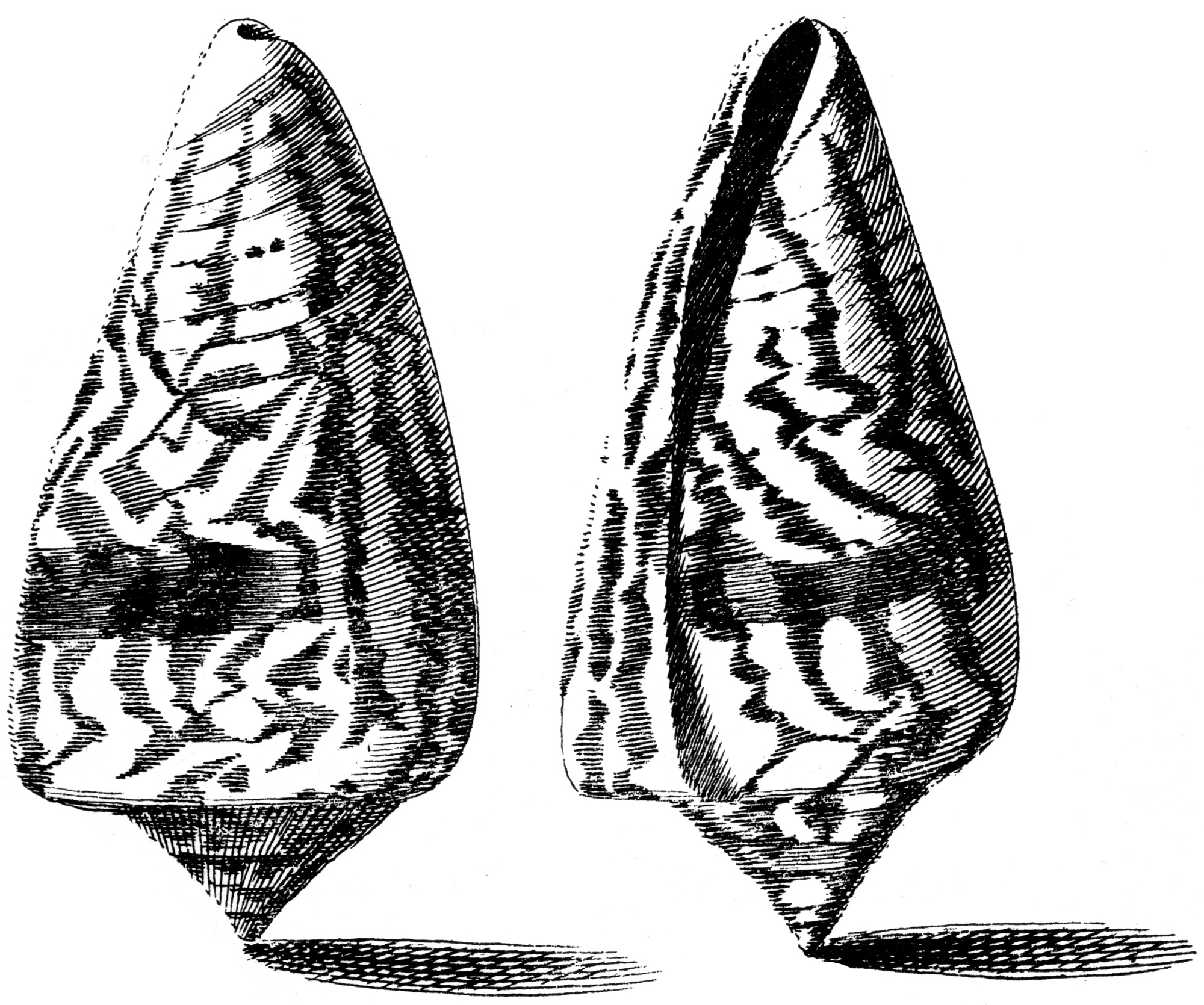

Conservation status
- Least Concern (IUCN 3.1)

Scientific classification
- Kingdom: Animalia
- Phylum: Mollusca
- Class: Gastropoda
- Subclass: Caenogastropoda
- Order: Neogastropoda
- Superfamily: Conoidea
- Family: Conidae
- Genus: Conus
- Species: C. spectrum

Binomial name
- Conus spectrum Linnaeus, 1758

Synonyms
- Asprella spectrum (Linnaeus, 1758); Conus felinus Link, 1807; Conus filamentosus Reeve, 1849; Conus inflatus G. B. Sowerby II, 1833 (nomen dubium); Conus stillatus Reeve, 1849; Conus verreauxii Kiener, 1846; Conus (Phasmoconus) spectrum Linnaeus, 1758 · accepted, alternate representation; Cucullus carota Röding, 1798; Graphiconus spectrum (Linnaeus, 1758); Textilia spectrum Habe, 1964

= Conus spectrum =

Species of sea snail

Conus spectrum, common name the spectre cone, is a species of sea snail, a marine gastropod mollusk in the family Conidae, the cone snails and their allies.

Like all species within the genus Conus, these snails are predatory and venomous. They are capable of stinging humans, therefore live ones should be handled carefully or not at all.

== Description ==
The size of the shell varies between 30 mm and 76 mm. The thin shell is cylindrically turbinated and somewhat inflated. The lower part of the body whorl shows distant revolving grooves. The color of the shell is white, variously painted with chestnut longitudinal irregular streaks, usually forming three broad series or bands.

== Distribution ==
This species occurs in the Indian Ocean off Madagascar. It also occurs off Indonesia, Papua New Guinea, the Philippines, the Ryukyu Islands, Taiwan and Queensland, Australia.

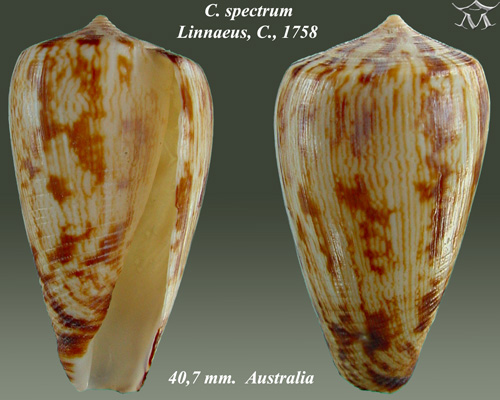
Conus spectrum Linnaeus, C., 1758

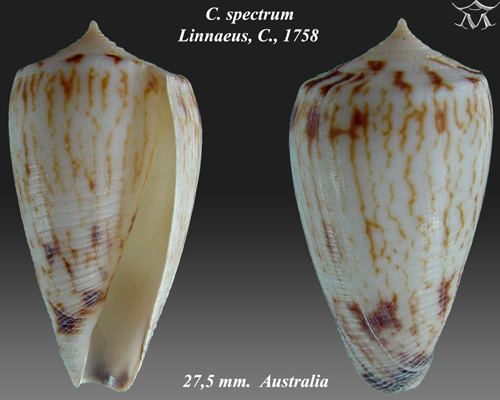
Conus spectrum Linnaeus, C., 1758
