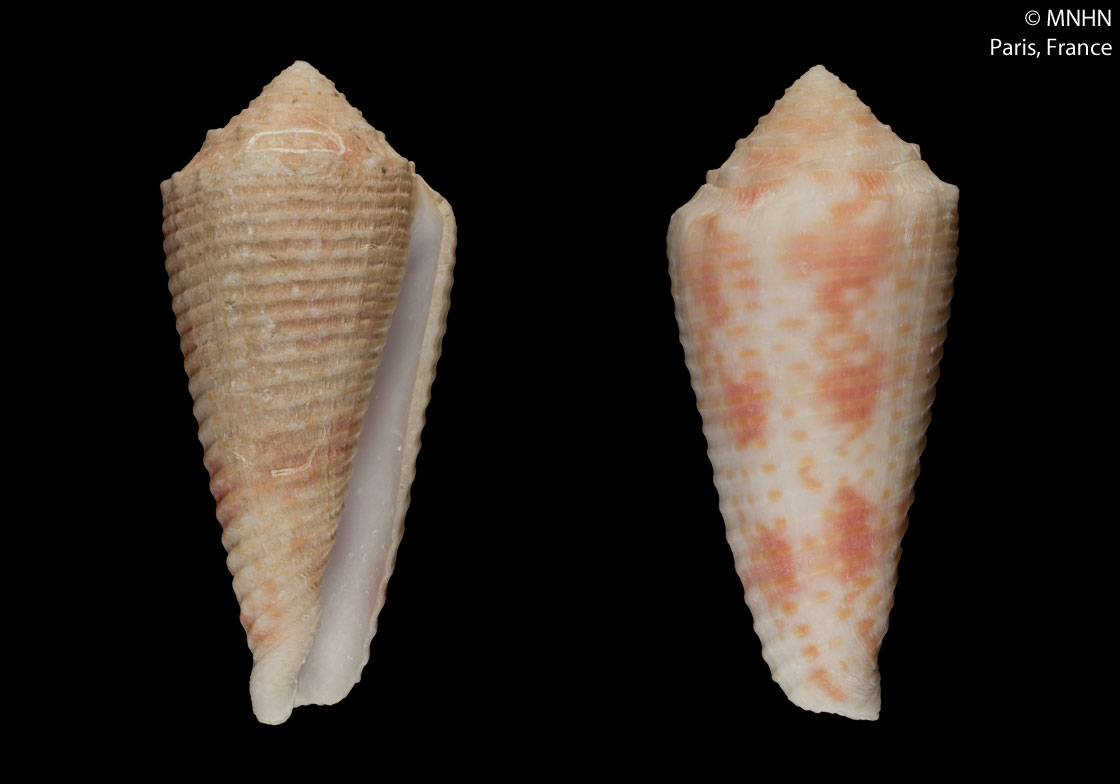
- Shell of Conus vappereaui (specimen at MNHN, Paris)

Scientific classification
- Kingdom: Animalia
- Phylum: Mollusca
- Class: Gastropoda
- Subclass: Caenogastropoda
- Order: Neogastropoda
- Superfamily: Conoidea
- Family: Conidae
- Genus: Conus
- Species: C. vappereaui

Binomial name
- Conus vappereaui Monteiro, 2009

Synonyms
- Conus (Phasmoconus) vappereaui Monteiro, 2009 · accepted, alternate representation; Conus moluccensis vappereaui Monteiro, 2009 (original combination); Fulgiconus vappereaui (Monteiro, 2009); Phasmoconus vappereaui (Monteiro, 2009)

= Conus vappereaui =

Species of sea snail

Conus vappereaui is a species of sea snail, a marine gastropod mollusk in the family Conidae, the cone snails, cone shells or cones.

These snails are predatory and venomous. They are capable of stinging humans.

== Description ==
The size of the shell varies between 40 mm and 60 mm.

== Distribution ==
This marine species occurs in the Pacific Ocean off Tahiti and Tuamotu.
