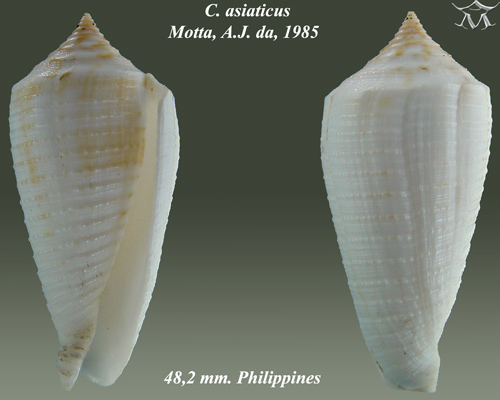
- Apertural and abapertural views of shell of Conus asiaticus Motta, A.J. da, 1985
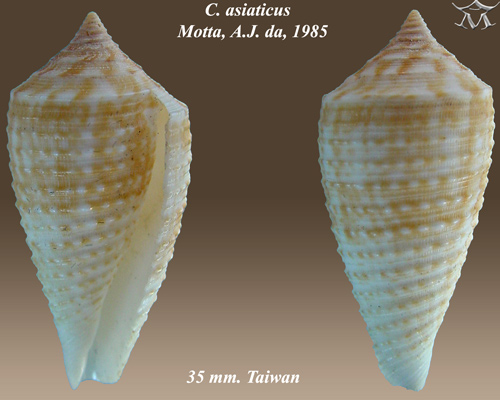

Conservation status
- Least Concern (IUCN 3.1)

Scientific classification
- Kingdom: Animalia
- Phylum: Mollusca
- Class: Gastropoda
- Subclass: Caenogastropoda
- Order: Neogastropoda
- Superfamily: Conoidea
- Family: Conidae
- Genus: Conus
- Species: C. asiaticus

Binomial name
- Conus asiaticus da Motta, 1985

Synonyms
- Conus (Phasmoconus) asiaticus da Motta, 1985 accepted, alternate representation; Conus asiaticus asiaticus da Motta, 1985; Phasmoconus asiaticus (da Motta, 1985); Phasmoconus asiaticus asiaticus (da Motta, 1985)

= Conus asiaticus =

Species of sea snail

Conus asiaticus is a species of sea snail, a marine gastropod mollusk in the family Conidae, the cone snails and their allies.

Like all species within the genus Conus, these snails are predatory and venomous. They are capable of stinging humans, therefore live ones should be handled carefully or not at all.

There is one subspecies: Conus asiaticus lovellreevei G. Raybaudi Massilia, 1993 (synonym: Conus lovellreevei G. Raybaudi Massilia, 1993).

== Description ==
The size of an adult shell varies between 35 mm and 52 mm.

== Distribution ==
This marine species occurs in the Pacific Ocean off the Philippines and Japan and in the South China Sea off Vietnam.

== Gallery ==
Conus asiaticus lovellreevei

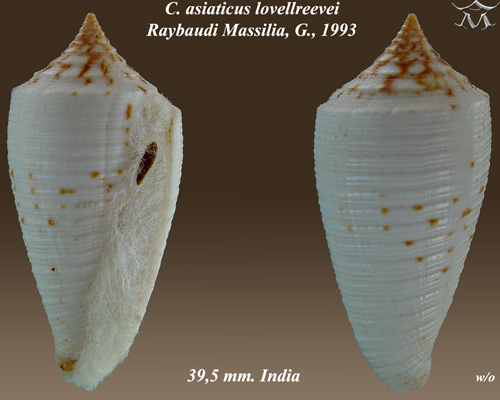
Conus asiaticus lovellreevei Raybaudi Massilia, G., 1993
