= Conus cebuensis =

Scientific classification
- Kingdom: Animalia
- Phylum: Mollusca
- Class: Gastropoda
- Subclass: Caenogastropoda
- Order: Neogastropoda
- Superfamily: Conoidea
- Family: Conidae
- Genus: Conus
- Species: C. cebuensis

Binomial name
- Conus cebuensis Wils, 1990

Synonyms
- Conus (Phasmoconus) cebuensis Wils, 1990 · accepted, alternate representation; Conus proximus cebuensis Wils, 1990; Phasmoconus cebuensis (Wils, 1990); Phasmoconus proximus cebuensis (Wils, 1990)

Species of sea snail

Conus cebuensis is a species of sea snail, a marine gastropod mollusk in the family Conidae and the order Neogastropoda. They are otherwise known as cone snails, cone shells or cones.

They usually inhabit the neritic zone, in the shallow part, between depths of 25 meters and 250 meters. These snails, like other members of the Conidae family are predatory and venomous. They are also capable of stinging humans.

== Description ==
This snail has been reported to be between 25 mm and 45 mm by length.

== Distribution ==
These marine species are found in the oceans of the New Caledonia region, specifically near Philippines, Indonesia, Papua New Guinea and Fiji.
