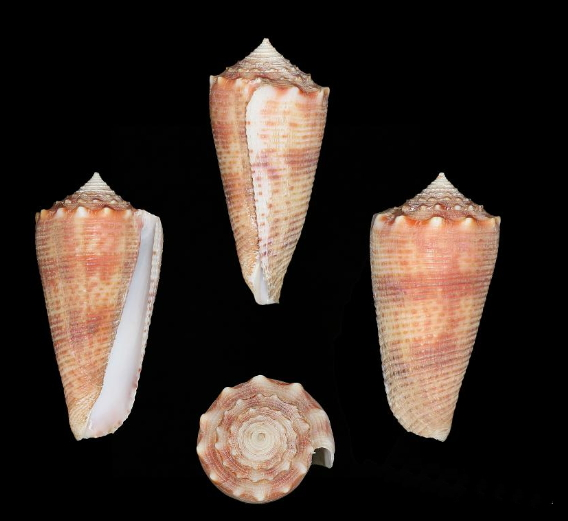
- Shell and protoconch of Conus marielae (holotype at the Smithsonian Institution)

Scientific classification
- Kingdom: Animalia
- Phylum: Mollusca
- Class: Gastropoda
- Subclass: Caenogastropoda
- Order: Neogastropoda
- Superfamily: Conoidea
- Family: Conidae
- Genus: Conus
- Species: C. marielae

Binomial name
- Conus marielae Rehder & Wilson, 1975

Synonyms
- Conus (Phasmoconus) marielae Rehder & Wilson, 1975 · accepted, alternate representation; Conus moluccensis marielae Rehder & Wilson, 1975; Fulgiconus marielae (Rehder & Wilson, 1975); Phasmoconus marielae (Rehder & Wilson, 1975)

= Conus marielae =

Species of sea snail

Conus marielae, common name Mariel's cone, is a species of sea snail, a marine gastropod mollusk in the family Conidae, the cone snails and their allies.

Like all species within the genus Conus, these snails are predatory and venomous. They are capable of stinging humans, therefore live ones should be handled carefully or not at all.

== Description ==
The size of the shell varies between 30 mm and 60 mm.

== Distribution ==
This species occurs in the Pacific Ocean off the Marquesas, Tuamotus and the Marshall Islands.
