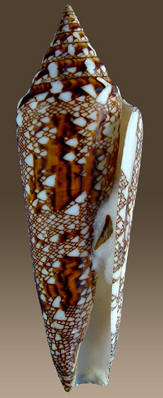
- Apertural and abapertural views of a shell of Conus bengalensis Okutani, 1968.

Scientific classification
- Kingdom: Animalia
- Phylum: Mollusca
- Class: Gastropoda
- Subclass: Caenogastropoda
- Order: Neogastropoda
- Family: Conidae
- Genus: Conus
- Subgenus: Darioconus; Iredale, 1930

Type species
- Conus omaria Hwass in Bruguière, 1792

Synonyms
- Darioconus Iredale, 1930; Erythroconus da Motta, 1991; Regiconus Iredale, 1930

= Conus (Darioconus) =

Subgenus of gastropods

Darioconus is a subgenus of sea snails, marine gastropod molluscs in the genus Conus, family Conidae, the cone snails and their allies.

In the new classification of the family Conidae by Puillandre N., Duda T.F., Meyer C., Olivera B.M. & Bouchet P. (2015), Darioconus has become a subgenus of Conus: Conus (Darioconus) Tucker & Tenorio, 2013 represented as Conus Thiele, 1929

== Distinguishing characteristics ==
The Tucker & Tenorio 2009 taxonomy distinguishes Darioconus from Conus in the following ways:

- Genus Conus Linnaeus, 1758

Shell characters (living and fossil species)

The basic shell shape is conical to elongated conical, has a deep anal notch on the shoulder, a smooth periostracum and a small operculum. The shoulder of the shell is usually nodulose and the protoconch is usually multispiral. Markings often include the presence of tents except for black or white color variants, with the absence of spiral lines of minute tents and textile bars.

Radular tooth (not known for fossil species)

The radula has an elongated anterior section with serrations and a large exposed terminating cusp, a non-obvious waist, blade is either small or absent and has a short barb, and lacks a basal spur.

Geographical distribution

These species are found in the Indo-Pacific region.

Feeding habits

These species eat other gastropods including cones.

- Subgenus Darioconus Iredale, 1930

Shell characters (living and fossil species)

The shell is ovate in shape. The protoconch can be paucispiral or multispiral, poorly developed nodules die out in the early postnuclear whorls, and the sides of the body whole are convex. The anal notch is moderate to shallow. The shell does not have textile bars, but is ornamented with spiral lines of minute tents. The periostracum is smooth, and the operculum is small.

Radular tooth (not known for fossil species)

The anterior section of the radula is substantially more elongated than the posterior section. The waist is not obvious. A basal spur is absent, and the blade and barb is short. A terminating cusp is present.

Geographical distribution

These species are found in the Indo-Pacific region.

Feeding habits

These species are molluscivorous (meaning that they prey on other mollusks).

== Species list ==
This list of species is based on the information in the World Register of Marine Species (WoRMS) list. Species within the genus Darioconus include:

- Darioconus leviteni Tucker, Tenorio & Chaney, 2011
- Darioconus aulicus (Linnaeus, 1758): synonym of Conus aulicus Linnaeus, 1758
- Darioconus auratinus (da Motta, 1982): synonym of Conus auratinus da Motta, 1982
- Darioconus auricomus (Hwass in Bruguière, 1792): synonym of Conus auricomus Hwass in Bruguière, 1792
- Darioconus behelokensis (Lauer, 1989): synonym of Conus behelokensis Lauer, 1989
- Darioconus bengalensis Okutani, 1968: synonym of Conus bengalensis (Okutani, 1968)
- Darioconus crocatus (Lamarck, 1810): synonym of Conus crocatus Lamarck, 1810
- Darioconus echo (Lauer, 1988): synonym of Conus pennaceus echo Lauer, 1988
- Darioconus episcopatus (da Motta, 1982): synonym of Conus episcopatus Da Motta, 1982
- Darioconus fortdauphinensis Bozzetti, 2015: synonym of Conus fortdauphinensis (Bozzetti, 2015)
- Darioconus lamberti (Souverbie, 1877): synonym of Conus lamberti Souverbie, 1877
- Darioconus laueri Monnier & Limpalaër, 2013: synonym of Conus (Darioconus) laueri (Monnier & Limpalaër, 2013) represented as Conus laueri (Monnier & Limpalaër, 2013)
- Darioconus leviteni Tucker, Tenorio & Chaney, 2011: synonym of Conus (Darioconus) leviteni (Tucker, Tenorio & Chaney, 2011) represented as Conus leviteni (Tucker, Tenorio & Chaney, 2011)
- Darioconus lohri (Kilburn, 1972): synonym of Conus lohri Kilburn, 1972
- Darioconus madagascariensis (G.B. Sowerby II, 1858): synonym of Conus madagascariensis G. B. Sowerby II, 1858
- Darioconus magnificus (Reeve, 1843): synonym of Conus magnificus Reeve, 1843
- Darioconus natalaurantius S. G. Veldsman, 2013: synonym of Conus (Darioconus) natalaurantius (S. G. Veldsman, 2013) represented as Conus natalaurantius (S. G. Veldsman, 2013)
- Darioconus omaria (Hwass in Bruguière, 1792): synonym of Conus (Darioconus) omaria Hwass in Bruguière, 1792 represented as Conus omaria Hwass in Bruguière, 1792
- Darioconus pennaceus (Born, 1778): synonym of Conus pennaceus Born, 1778
- Darioconus textilis: synonym of Conus textile Linnaeus, 1758
- Darioconus thomae Gmelin, 1791:synonym of Conus (Darioconus) thomae Gmelin, 1791, represented as Conus thomae Gmelin, 1791
