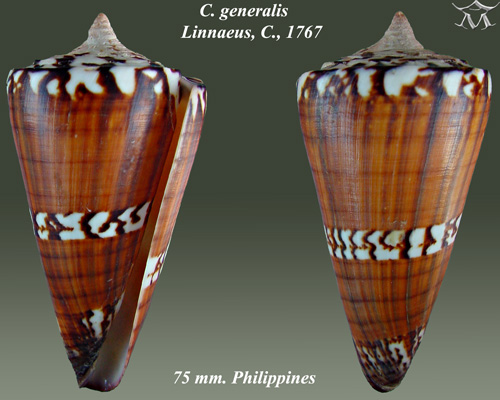
- Apertural and abapertural views of shell of Conus generalis (Linnaeus, 1767)

Scientific classification
- Kingdom: Animalia
- Phylum: Mollusca
- Class: Gastropoda
- Subclass: Caenogastropoda
- Order: Neogastropoda
- Family: Conidae
- Genus: Conus
- Subgenus: Strategoconus da Motta, 1991

Type species
- Conus generalis Linnaeus, 1767

Synonyms
- Conus (Vituliconus) da Motta, 1991; Rolaniconus J. K. Tucker & M. Tenorio, 2009; Strategoconus da Motta, 1991; Strategoconus (Vituliconus) da Motta, 1991; Vituliconus da Motta, 1991

= Conus (Strategoconus) =

Subgenus of gastropods

Strategoconus is a subgenus of sea snails, marine gastropod molluscs in the genus Conus, family Conidae, the cone snails and their allies.

In the latest classification of the family Conidae by Puillandre N., Duda T.F., Meyer C., Olivera B.M. & Bouchet P. (2015), Strategoconus has become a subgenus of Conus as Conus (Strategoconus)da Motta, 1991 (type species:Conus generalis Linnaeus, 1767) represented as Conus Linnaeus, 1758

== Species ==
The following species are alternate representation:

- Strategoconus generalis (Linnaeus, 1767) represented as Conus generalis Linnaeus, 1767 (alternate representation)
- Strategoconus litoglyphus (Hwass in Bruguière, 1792) represented as Conus litoglyphus Hwass in Bruguière, 1792 (alternate representation)
- Strategoconus litteratus (Linnaeus, 1758) represented as Conus litteratus Linnaeus, 1758 (alternate representation)
- Strategoconus maldivus (Hwass in Bruguière, 1792) represented as Conus maldivus Hwass in Bruguière, 1792 (alternate representation)
- Strategoconus monile (Hwass in Bruguière, 1792) represented as Conus monile Hwass in Bruguière, 1792 (alternate representation)
- Strategoconus splendidulus (G.B. Sowerby I, 1833) represented as Conus splendidulus G. B. Sowerby I, 1833 (alternate representation)
- Strategoconus thomae (Gmelin, 1791) represented as Conus thomae Gmelin, 1791 (alternate representation)
