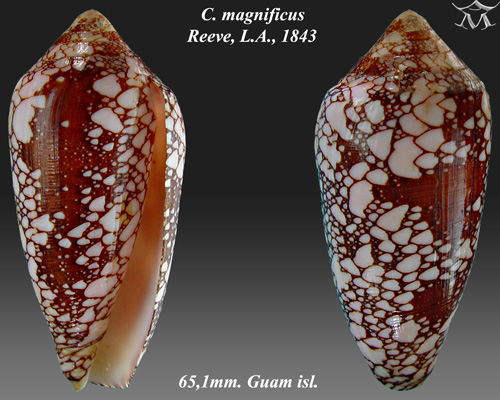
- Apertural and abapertural views of shell of Conus magnificus Reeve, L.A., 1843
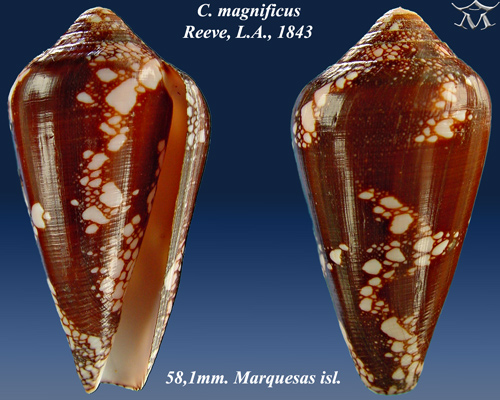

Scientific classification
- Domain: Eukaryota
- Kingdom: Animalia
- Phylum: Mollusca
- Class: Gastropoda
- Subclass: Caenogastropoda
- Order: Neogastropoda
- Superfamily: Conoidea
- Family: Conidae
- Genus: Conus
- Species: C. magnificus

Binomial name
- Conus magnificus Reeve, 1843

Synonyms
- Conus (Darioconus) magnificus Reeve, 1843 · accepted, alternate representation; Darioconus magnificus (Reeve, 1843)

= Conus magnificus =

Species of sea snail

Conus magnificus, common name the "magnificent cone", is a species of predatory sea snail, a marine gastropod mollusk in the family Conidae, the cone snails, cone shells or cones.

The subspecies Conus magnificus macilentus Lauer, 1989is a synonym of Conus episcopatus da Motta, 1982

== Distribution ==
This is a marine Indo-Pacific species, excluding Hawaii; also off Australia (Queensland). It is a species common to Vietnam and Southeast Asia. Some specimens are seen in French Polynesia and in the Northern Red Sea, but they are considered rare.

== Shell description ==
The size of the shell varies between 55 mm and 92 mm. The shell is intricately marked with a white ground color overlaid with brown to red brown.
