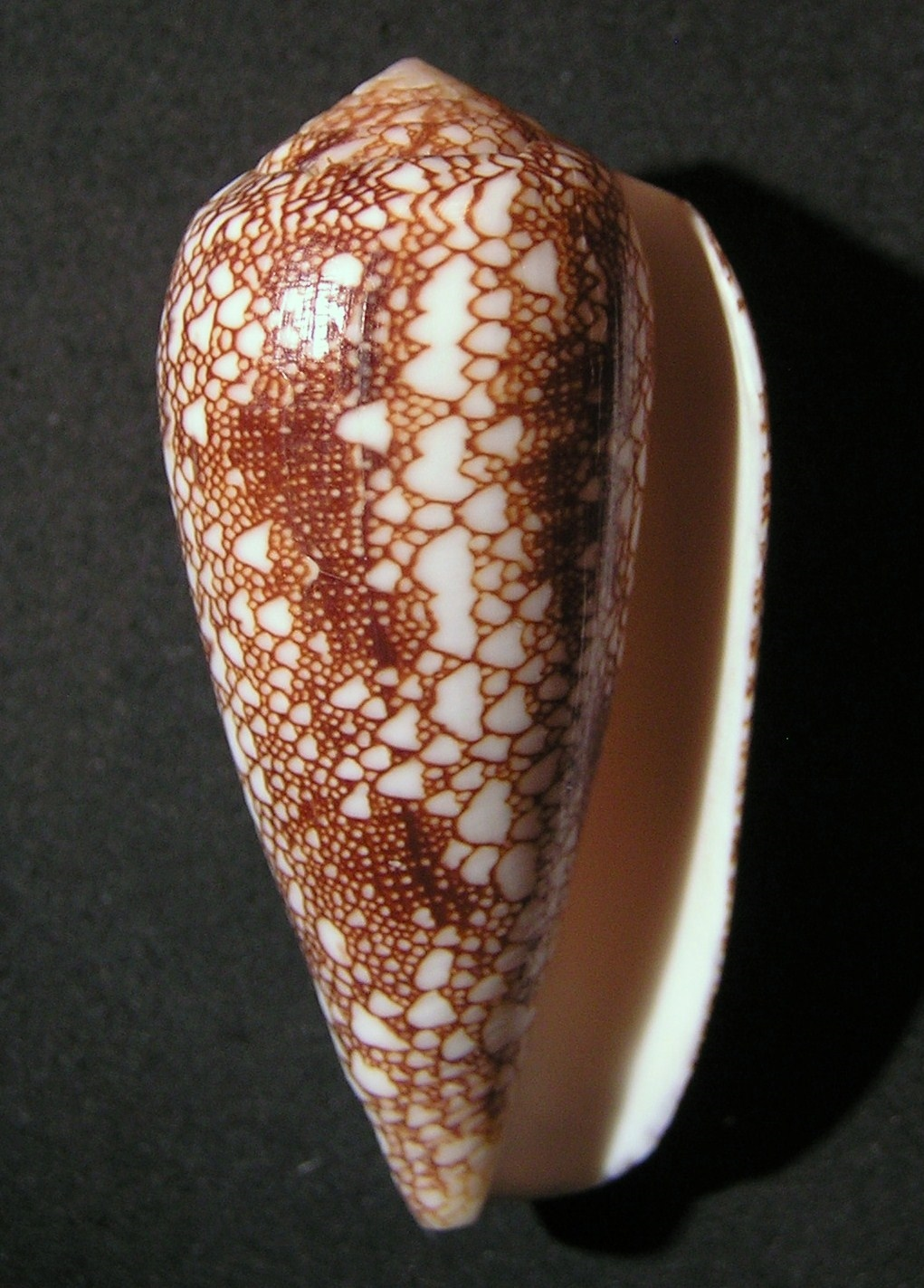
- Apertural view of a shell of Conus omaria

Conservation status
- Least Concern (IUCN 3.1)

Scientific classification
- Kingdom: Animalia
- Phylum: Mollusca
- Class: Gastropoda
- Subclass: Caenogastropoda
- Order: Neogastropoda
- Superfamily: Conoidea
- Family: Conidae
- Genus: Conus
- Species: C. omaria

Binomial name
- Conus omaria Hwass in Bruguière, 1792

Synonyms
- Conus (Darioconus) omaria Hwass in Bruguière, 1792 · accepted, alternate representation; Conus convolutus G. B. Sowerby II, 1858; Conus magoides Melvill, 1900.; Conus omaria var. magoides Melvill, 1900; Conus patonganus da Motta, 1982; Conus sindon Reeve, 1844.; Conus viperinus Lauer, 1986; Darioconus omaria (Hwass in Bruguière, 1792); Darioconus omaria convolutus (f) G. B. Sowerby II, 1858

= Conus omaria =

Species of sea snail

Conus omaria, common name the Omaria cone, is a species of sea snail, a marine gastropod mollusk in the family Conidae, the cone snails and their allies.

Like all species within the genus Conus, these snails are predatory and venomous. They are capable of stinging humans, therefore live ones should be handled carefully or not at all.

The variety Conus omaria var. marmoricolor Melvill, 1900 is a synonym of Conus pennaceus Born, 1778.

== Description ==
The shell varies in length between 33 mm and 86 mm. The color of the shell varies from orange-brown to chocolate-color, covered by minute white spots, and overlaid by larger white triangular spots, sometimes forming bands at the shoulder, middle and base.

== Distribution ==
This species occurs in the Central and East Indian Ocean off Aldabra, Madagascar, the Mascarene Basin and Tanzania; off the Philippines and Australia (Northern Territory, Queensland, Western Australia).

== Gallery ==
Below are several color forms:

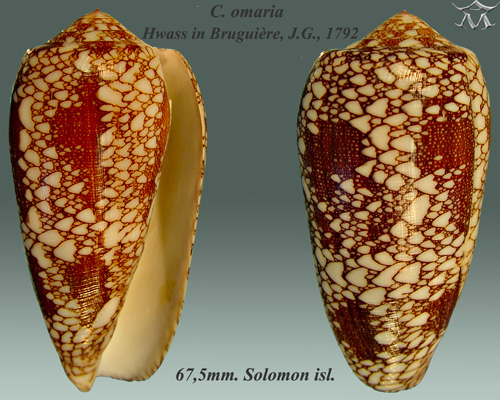
Conus omaria Hwass in Bruguière, J.G., 1792

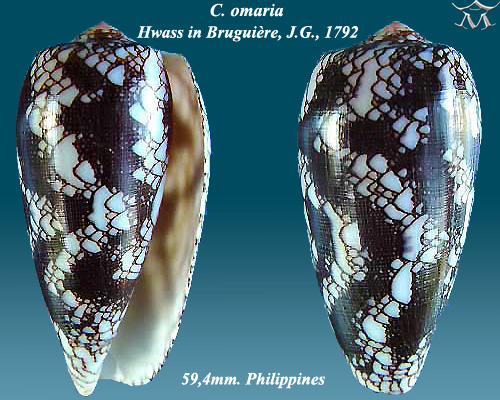
Conus omaria Hwass in Bruguière, J.G., 1792

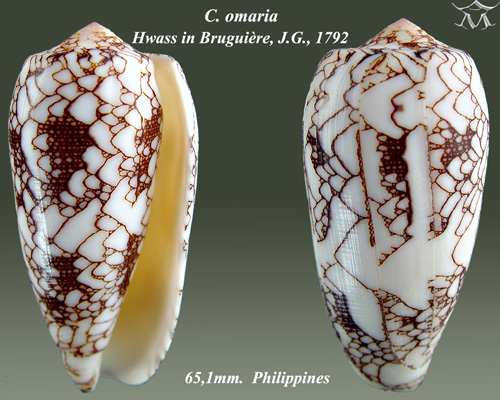
Conus omaria Hwass in Bruguière, J.G., 1792

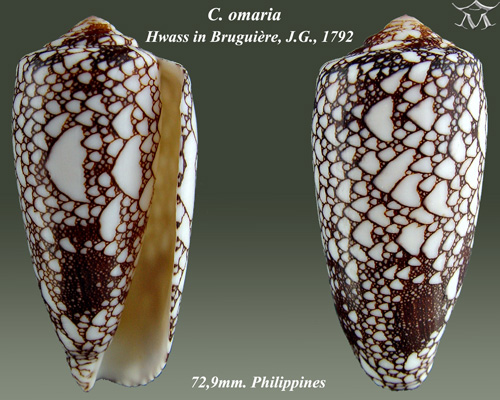
Conus omaria Hwass in Bruguière, J.G., 1792

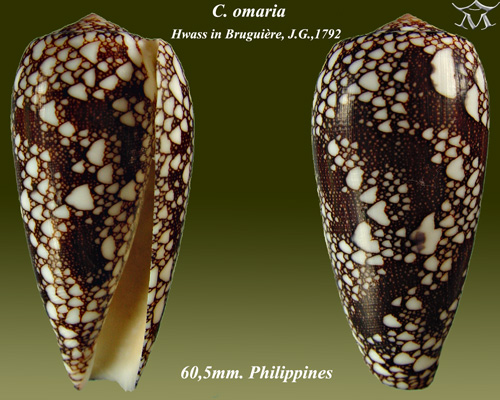
Conus omaria Hwass in Bruguière, J.G., 1792

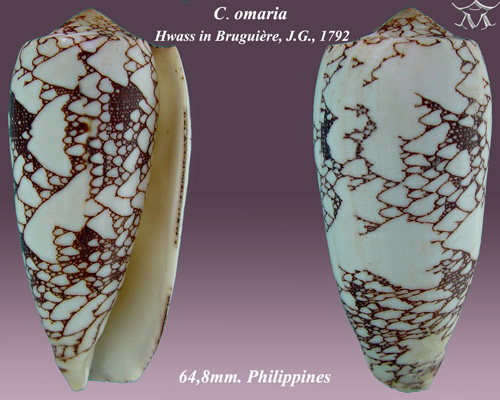
Conus omaria Hwass in Bruguière, J.G., 1792

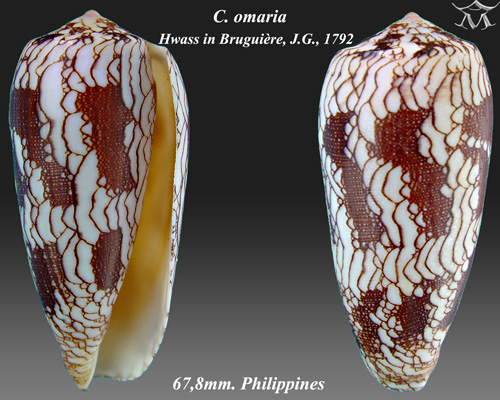
Conus omaria Hwass in Bruguière, J.G., 1792

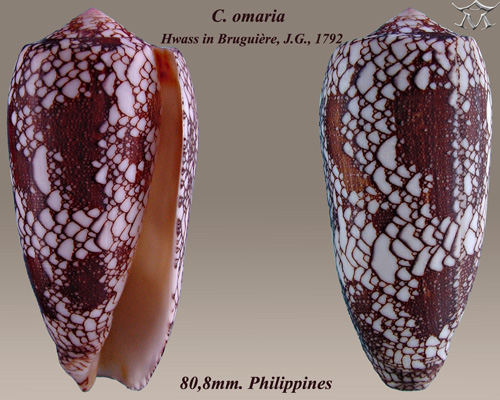
Conus omaria Hwass in Bruguière, J.G., 1792
