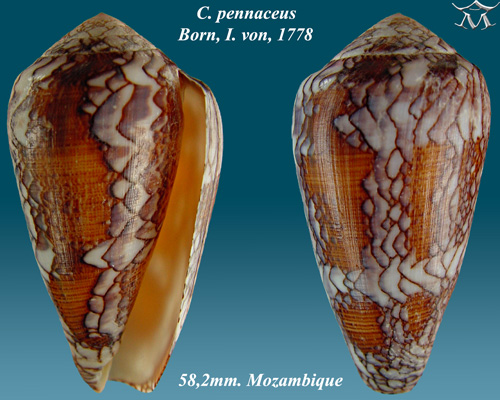
- Apertural and abapertural views of shell of Conus pennaceus Born, I. von, 1778
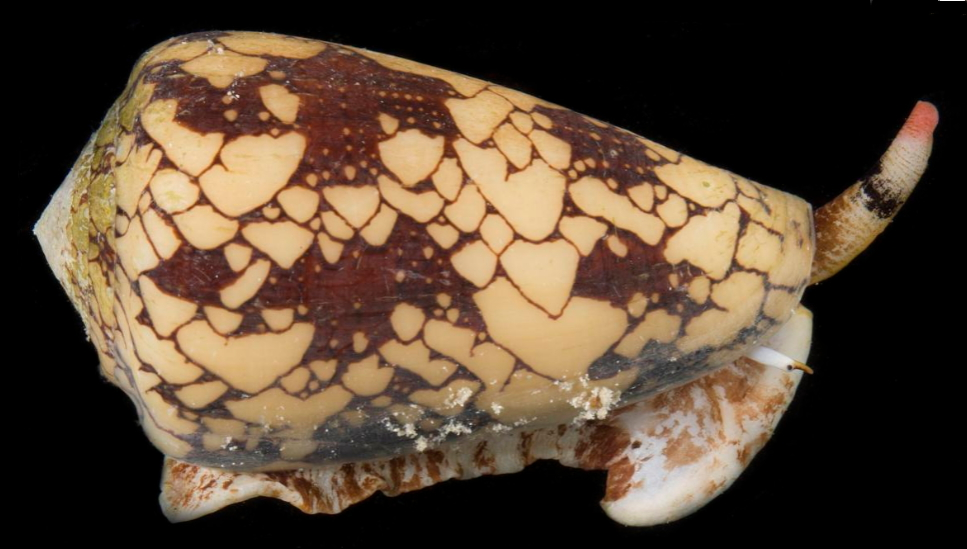

Conservation status
- Least Concern (IUCN 3.1)

Scientific classification
- Kingdom: Animalia
- Phylum: Mollusca
- Class: Gastropoda
- Subclass: Caenogastropoda
- Order: Neogastropoda
- Superfamily: Conoidea
- Family: Conidae
- Genus: Conus
- Species: C. pennaceus

Binomial name
- Conus pennaceus Born, 1778

Synonyms
- Conus (Darioconus) pennaceus Born, 1778 · accepted, alternate representation; Conus aureus Röding, P.F., 1798 (invalid, junior homonym of Conus aureus Hwass in Bruguière, 1792); Conus colubrinus Lamarck, 1810; Conus elisae Kiener, 1850; Conus episcopus Hwass in Bruguière, 1792; Conus episcopus mauritiensis Lauer, 1992; Conus omaria var. marmoricolor Melvill, 1900; Conus pennaceus bazarutensis Fernandes & Monteiro, 1988; Conus pennaceus corbieri Blöcher, 1994; Conus pennaceus ganensis Delsaerdt, 1988; Conus pennaceus tsara Korn, Niederhöfer & Blöcher, 2000; Conus praelatus Hwass in Bruguière, 1792; Conus purus Pease, W.H., 1863, "1862"; Conus quasimagnificus Reeve, 1843; Conus racemosus G. B. Sowerby II, 1874; Conus rubiginosus Hwass in Bruguière, 1792; Conus rubropennatus Da Motta, 1982; Conus stellatus Kiener, 1845; Cucullus aureus Röding, 1798 (junior secondary homonym of Conus aureus Hwass in Bruguière, 1792); Cucullus gentilis Röding, 1798; Darioconus pennaceus (Born, 1778); Gastridium episcopus Salvat, B. & Rives, C. 1975

= Conus pennaceus =

Species of sea snail

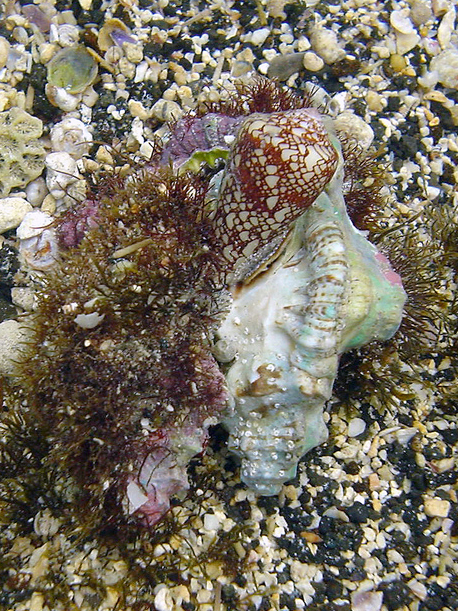
A Conus pennaceus attacking one of a cluster of three Cymatium nicobaricum in Hawaii

Conus pennaceus, common name the feathered cone or the episcopal cone, is a species of sea snail, a marine gastropod mollusk in the family Conidae, the cone snails and their allies.

Like all species within the genus Conus, these snails are predatory and venomous. They are capable of stinging humans, therefore live ones should be handled carefully or not at all.

== Subspecies ==
- Conus pennaceus pennaceus Born, 1778
- Conus pennaceus pseudoecho (Bozzetti, 2013)
- Conus pennaceus vezoi Korn, Niederhöfer & Blöcher, 2000
- Conus pennaceus behelokensis Lauer, 1989: now considered to be a synonym of Conus behelokensis Lauer, 1989
- Conus pennaceus echo Lauer, 1988: now considered to be a synonym of Conus echo Lauer, 1989

== Description ==
The size of an adult shell varies between 35 mm and 88 mm. The color of the shell varies from orange-brown to chocolate, covered by minute white spots, and overlaid by larger white triangular spots, sometimes forming bands at the shoulder, middle and base.

== Distribution ==
This species occurs in the Indian Ocean off Mozambique and Kenya. The nominal species is found along the shores of the tropical Eastern Africa. The shells vary greatly in shape and colour. They often have a background with bluish or greyish hues and an orange to red brown pattern. The holotype of D. pennaceus is a stocky shell with an extremely wide shoulder that is rarely found in its range. The form elisae (Kiener, 1846) has an axially crowded pattern of tents that gives to the shells a darker aspect.

== Gallery ==
Below are several color forms:

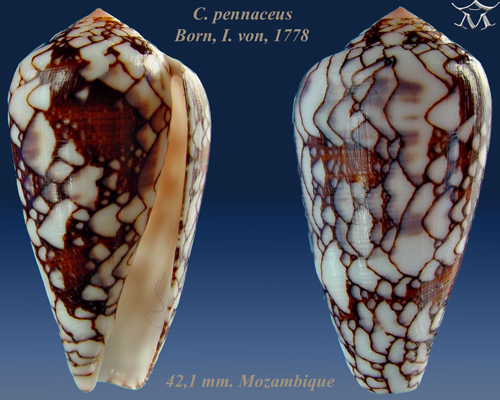
Conus penanceus Born, I. von, 1778

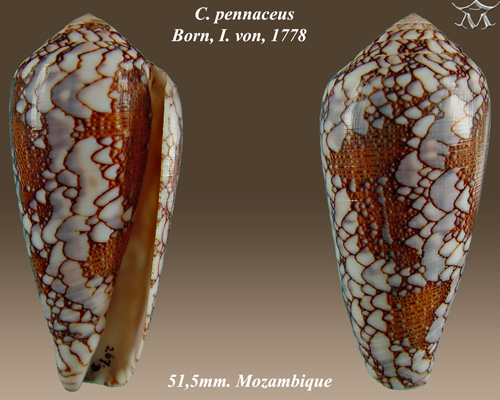
Conus pennaceus Born, I. von, 1778

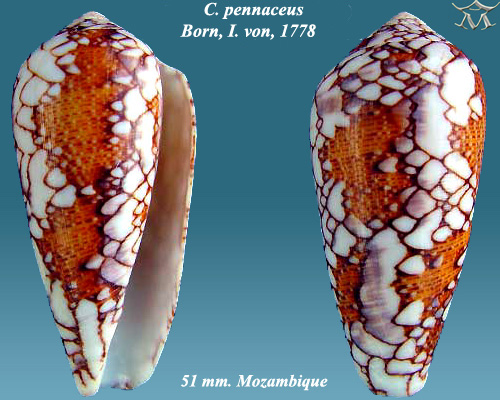
Conus pennaceus Born, I. von, 1778

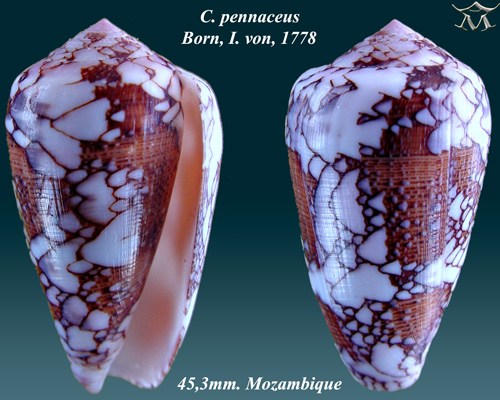
Conus pennaceus Born, I. von, 1778

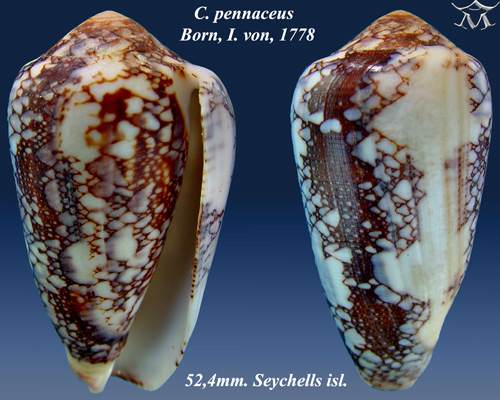
Conus pennaceus Born, I. von, 1778

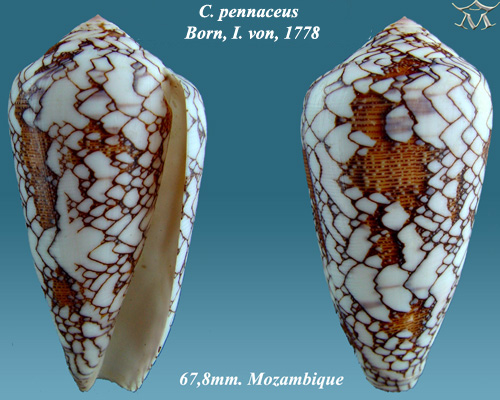
Conus pennaceus Born, I. von, 1778

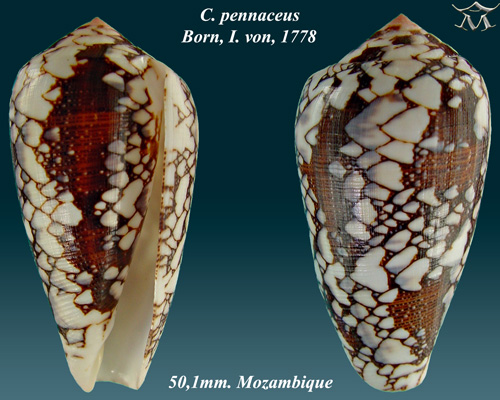
Conus pennaceus Born, I. von, 1778

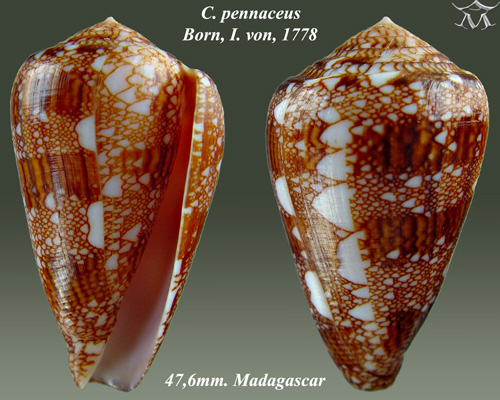
Conus pennaceus Born, I. von, 1778
