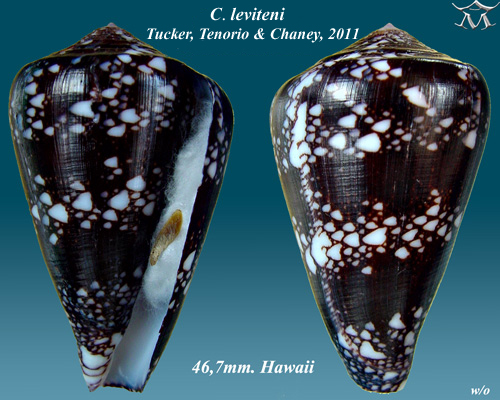
- Apertural and abapertural views of shell of Conus purus Tucker, Tenorio & Chaney, 2011
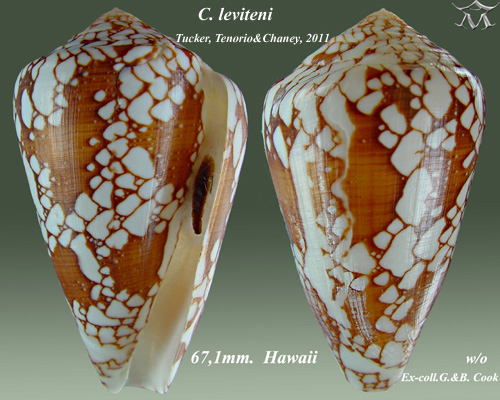

Scientific classification
- Kingdom: Animalia
- Phylum: Mollusca
- Class: Gastropoda
- Subclass: Caenogastropoda
- Order: Neogastropoda
- Superfamily: Conoidea
- Family: Conidae
- Genus: Conus
- Species: C. purus

Binomial name
- Conus purus Pease, 1863

Synonyms
- Conus (Darioconus) leviteni (Tucker, Tenorio & Chaney, 2011) · accepted, alternate representation; Conus (Darioconus) purus Pease, 1863 · alternate representation; Conus leviteni (J. K. Tucker, Tenorio & Chaney, 2011); Conus racemosus G. B. Sowerby III, 1874 · unaccepted* Conus stellatus Kiener, 1847; Darioconus leviteni Tucker, Tenorio & Chaney, 2011; Darioconus purus (Pease, 1863) ·

= Conus purus =

Species of sea snail

Conus purus is a species of sea snail, a marine gastropod mollusk in the family Conidae, the cone snails, cone shells or cones.

These snails are predatory and venomous. They are capable of stinging humans.

== Description ==
The size of the shell varies between 44 and 68 mm (1.7 and 2.7 in). Conus purus is white with a tented pattern tinged with reddish brown. The spire of the shell can range from flat to conical. Each individual cone shell has a different shell form, color, and pattern. The spire of the cone comes to spire or a point. Additionally, the animal has brown mottling and is tan, with distinct black, white, and red tips on the siphon.

== Behavior ==
Cone snails possess venom that is so strong that it may rapidly paralyze and ultimately kill victims. Conus purus venom is a complicated mixture of substances that blocks various neuromuscular pathways, ultimately resulting in paralysis. It is estimated that the number of bioactive chemicals in each snail's venom is over 100,000. The development of a potent antitoxin has been hampered by the venom's intricacy and the several target routes.

Unlike most cones, juveniles settle where they hatch.

It feeds on other mollusks.

== Distribution ==
This marine species is endemic to Hawaii. The cone inhabits shallow water, no deeper than 15 ft (4.6 m).

== Gallery ==
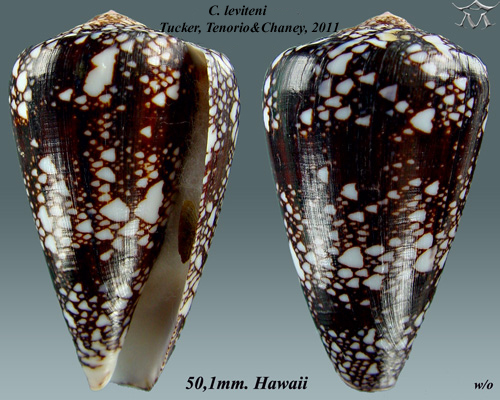
Conus purus Tucker, Tenorio & Chaney, 2011

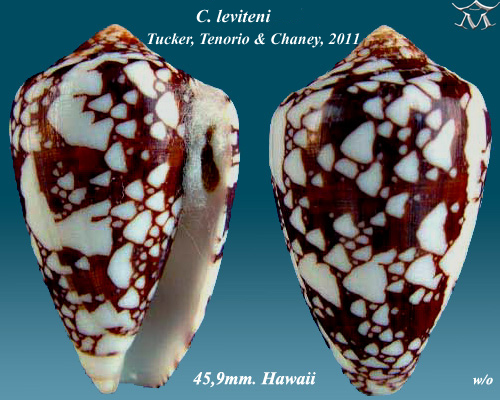
Conus purus Tucker, Tenorio & Chaney, 2011

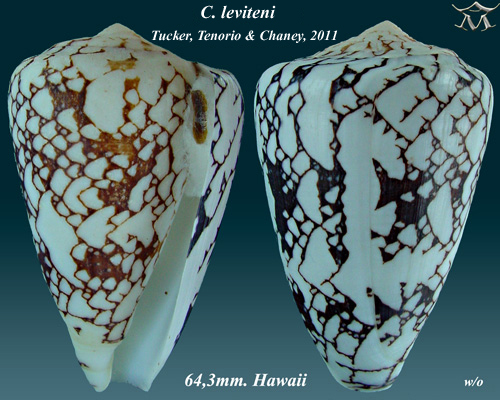
Conus purus Tucker, Tenorio & Chaney, 2011
