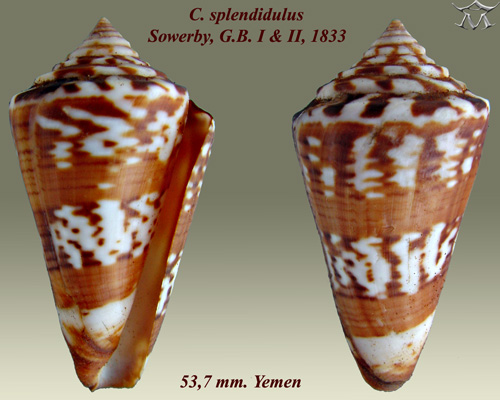
- Apertural and abapertural views of shell of Conus splendidulus Sowerby, G.B. I, 1833

Conservation status
- Data Deficient (IUCN 3.1)

Scientific classification
- Kingdom: Animalia
- Phylum: Mollusca
- Class: Gastropoda
- Subclass: Caenogastropoda
- Order: Neogastropoda
- Superfamily: Conoidea
- Family: Conidae
- Genus: Conus
- Species: C. splendidulus

Binomial name
- Conus splendidulus G. B. Sowerby I, 1833

Synonyms
- Conus (Strategoconus) splendidulus G. B. Sowerby I, 1833 · accepted, alternate representation; Conus anadema Tomlin, 1937; Conus fasciatus Kiener, 1845 (invalid: junior homonym of Conus fasciatus Schröter, 1803 and C. fasciatus Perry, 1811; C. anadema is a replacement name); Strategoconus splendidulus (G. B. Sowerby I, 1833)

= Conus splendidulus =

Species of sea snail

Conus splendidulus, common name the clay cone, is a species of sea snail, a marine gastropod mollusk in the family Conidae, the cone snails and their allies.

Like all species within the genus Conus, these snails are predatory and venomous. They are capable of stinging humans, therefore live ones should be handled carefully or not at all.

== Description ==
The size of the shell varies between 43 mm and 70 mm. The shell has an olive-brown, or ash color, with a white central band, and usually another obsolete one below the shoulder-angle, encircled by numerous chestnut and white articulated lines. The spire is maculated with chestnut. The aperture has a light chocolate color with a central white band.

== Distribution ==
This marine species occurs in the Gulf of Aden, off Northern Somalia and off the Laccadives.
