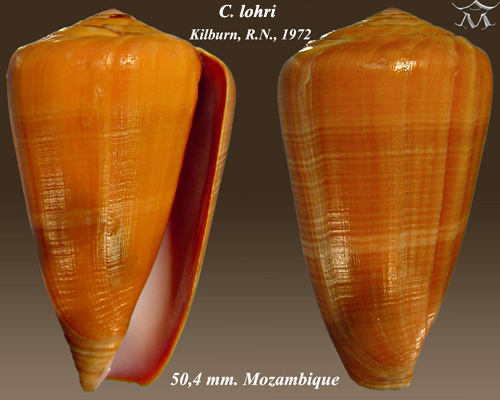
- Apertural and abapertural views of shell of Conus lohri Kilburn, R.N., 1972
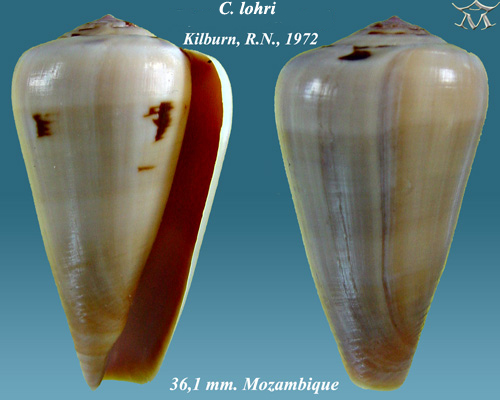

Scientific classification
- Kingdom: Animalia
- Phylum: Mollusca
- Class: Gastropoda
- Subclass: Caenogastropoda
- Order: Neogastropoda
- Superfamily: Conoidea
- Family: Conidae
- Genus: Conus
- Species: C. lohri

Binomial name
- Conus lohri Kilburn, 1972

Synonyms
- Conus (Darioconus) lohri Kilburn, 1972 · accepted, alternate representation; Darioconus lohri (Kilburn, 1972)

= Conus lohri =

Species of sea snail

Conus lohri is a species of sea snail, a marine gastropod mollusk in the family Conidae, the cone snails and their allies.

Like all species within the genus Conus, these snails are predatory and venomous. They are capable of stinging humans, therefore live ones should be handled carefully or not at all.

== Description ==
The size of the shell varies between 40 mm and 80 mm.

== Distribution ==
This marine species occurs from North KwaZulu-Natal, South Africa to East Africa.
