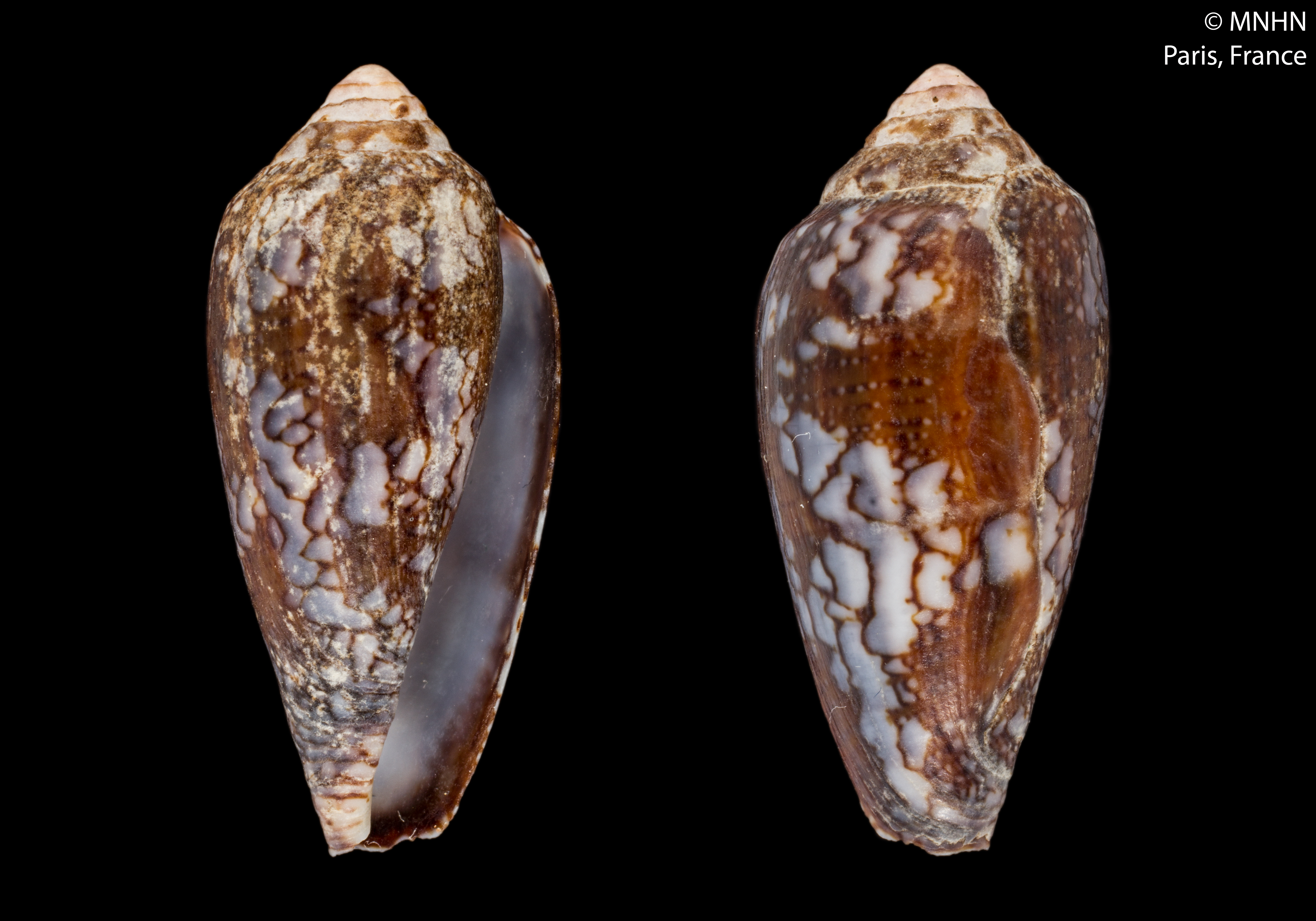
- Shell of Conus praelatus (holotype at MNHN, Paris)

Scientific classification
- Kingdom: Animalia
- Phylum: Mollusca
- Class: Gastropoda
- Subclass: Caenogastropoda
- Order: Neogastropoda
- Superfamily: Conoidea
- Family: Conidae
- Genus: Conus
- Species: C. praelatus

Binomial name
- Conus praelatus Hwass in Bruguière, 1792

Synonyms
- Conus (Darioconus) miniturritus Bozzetti, 2017; Conus (Darioconus) praelatus Hwass in Bruguière, 1792; Conus fortdauphinensis (Bozzetti, 2015); Conus miniturritus (Bozzetti, 2017); Conus pennaceus tsara Korn, Niederhöfer & Blöcher, 2000; Darioconus fortdauphinensis Bozzetti, 2015; Darioconus miniturritus Bozzetti, 2017; Darioconus praelatus (Hwass in Bruguière, 1792); Darioconus tsara (Korn, Niederhöfer & Blöcher, 2000)

= Conus praelatus =

Species of sea snail

Conus praelatus, common name the prelate cone, is a species of sea snail, a marine gastropod mollusk, in the family Conidae, the cone snails and their allies.

== Distribution ==
This species occurs in the following locations:

- Madagascar
- Tanzania
