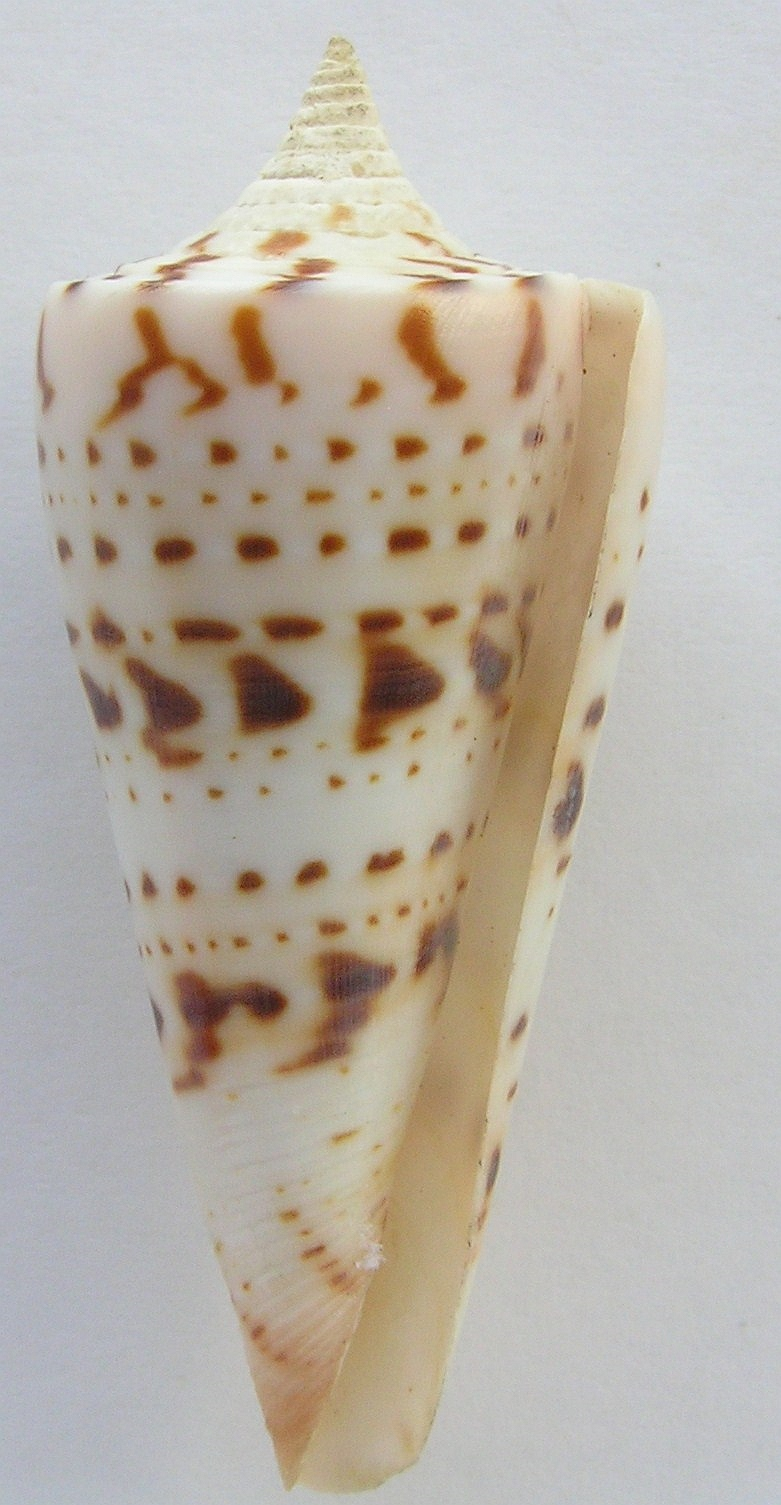
- Apertural view of Conus monile

Scientific classification
- Kingdom: Animalia
- Phylum: Mollusca
- Class: Gastropoda
- Subclass: Caenogastropoda
- Order: Neogastropoda
- Superfamily: Conoidea
- Family: Conidae
- Genus: Conus
- Species: C. monile

Binomial name
- Conus monile Hwass in Bruguière, 1792

Synonyms
- Conus (Strategoconus) monile Hwass in Bruguière, 1792 · accepted, alternate representation; Conus cereolus Röding, P.F., 1798; Conus marmoreus Perry, G., 1811; Conus ornatus Röding, P.F., 1798; Cucullus cereolus Röding, 1798; Cucullus ornatus Röding, 1798; Strategoconus monile Hwass in Bruguière, 1792

= Conus monile =

Species of sea snail

Conus monile, common name the necklace cone, is a species of sea snails, marine gastropod molluscs in the family Conidae, the cone snails and their allies.

Like all species within the genus Conus, these snails are predatory and venomous. They are capable of stinging humans, therefore live ones should be handled carefully or not at all.

== Description ==
The size of an adult shell varies between 45 mm and 95 mm. The chestnut-flamed spire is nearly plane, with a raised apex. The body whorl is closely striate below, and generally chestnut-stained at the base. The color of the shell is white, with oblique flames, spots and short lines of chestnut, arranged in revolving series.

== Distribution ==
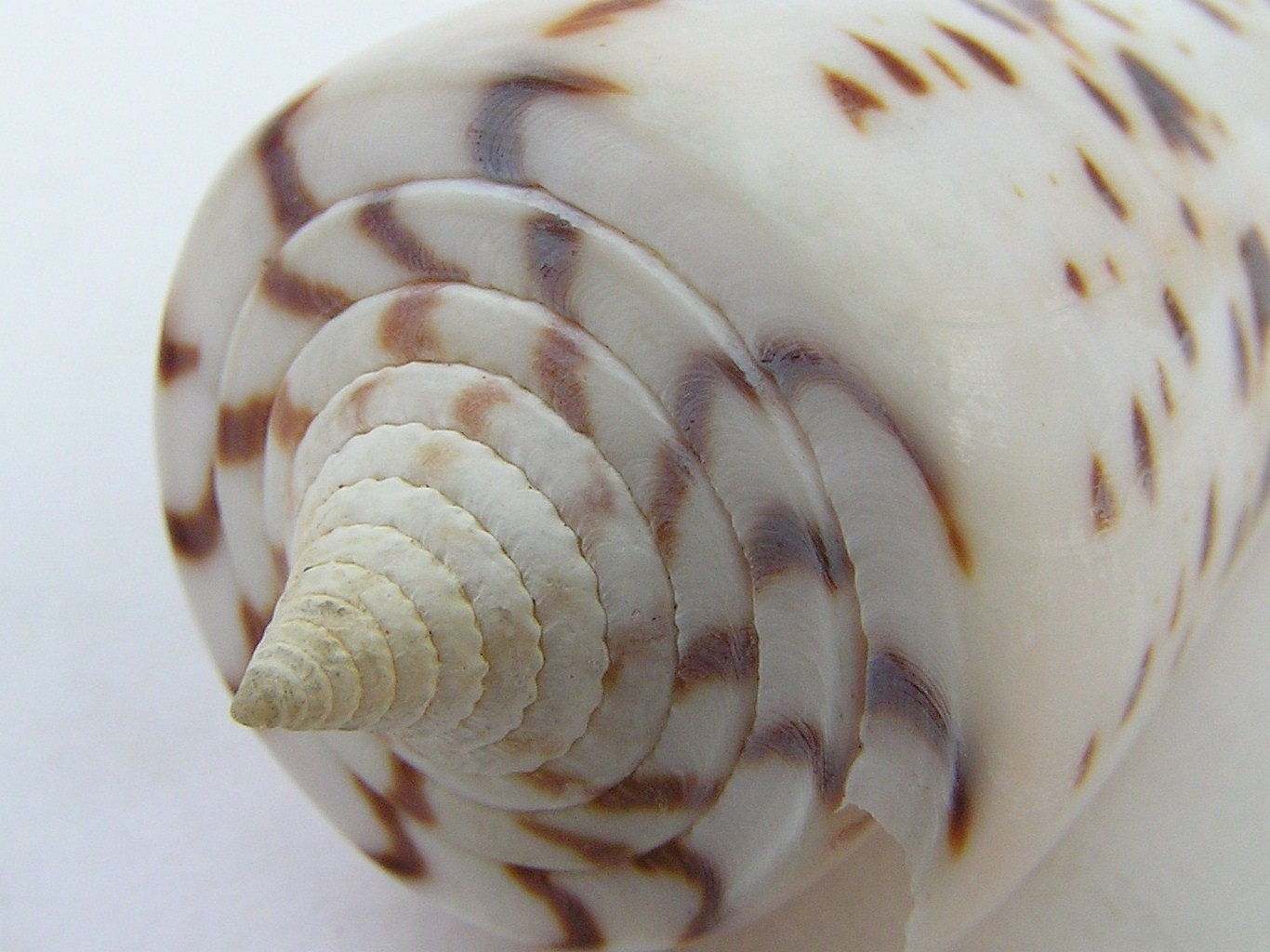
The raised apex of the spire of Conus monile

This species occurs in the Northeast Indian Ocean off India and Sri Lanka to Western Thailand and to Indonesia.

== Gallery ==
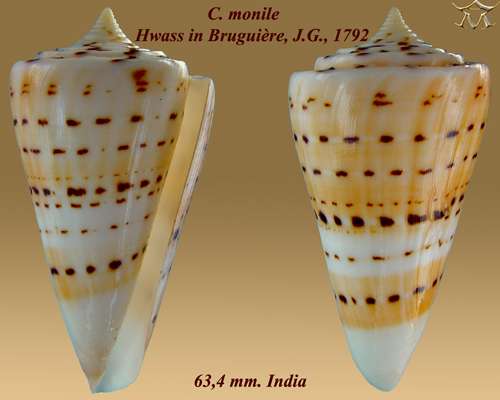
Conus monile Hwass in Bruguière, J.G., 1792

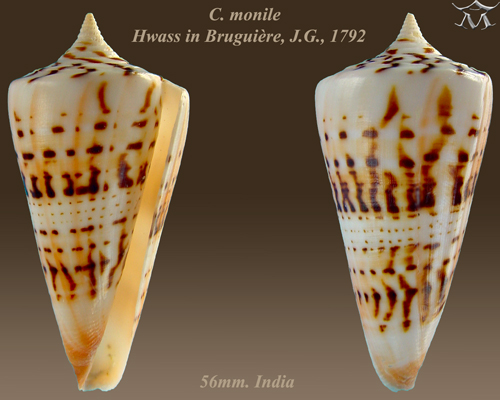
Conus monile Hwass in Bruguière, J.G., 1792

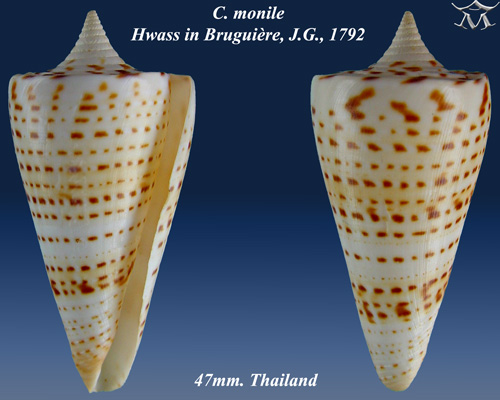
Conus monile Hwass in Bruguière, J.G., 1792

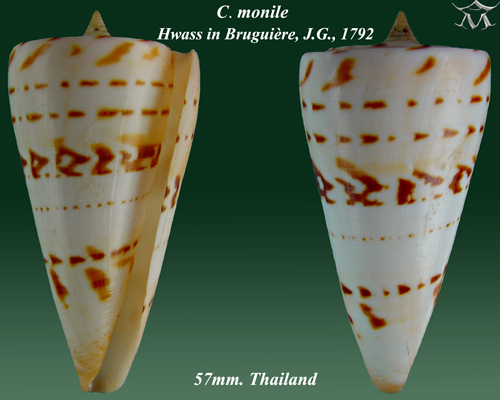
Conus monile Hwass in Bruguière, J.G., 1792
