= Conus laueri =

Scientific classification
- Kingdom: Animalia
- Phylum: Mollusca
- Class: Gastropoda
- Subclass: Caenogastropoda
- Order: Neogastropoda
- Superfamily: Conoidea
- Family: Conidae
- Genus: Conus
- Species: C. laueri

Binomial name
- Conus laueri (Monnier & Limpalaër, 2013)

Synonyms
- Conus (Darioconus) laueri (Monnier & Limpalaër, 2013) · accepted, alternate representation; Darioconus laueri Monnier & Limpalaër, 2013 (original combination)

Species of sea snail

Conus laueri is a species of sea snail, a marine gastropod mollusk in the family Conidae, the cone snails, cone shells or cones.

Like all species within the genus Conus, these snails are predatory and venomous. They are capable of stinging humans, therefore live ones should be handled carefully or not at all.

== Description ==
The size of the shell varies between 38 mm and 74 mm.

== Distribution ==
This marine species occurs in the Persian Gulf.
