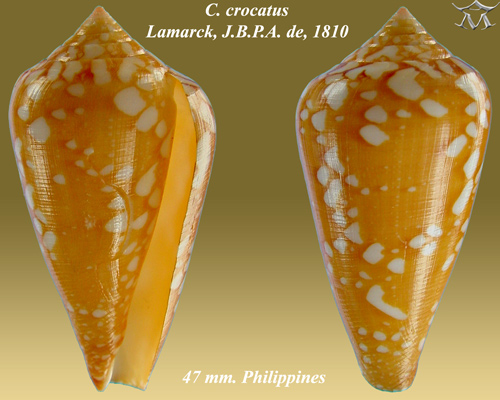
- Apertural and abapertural views of shell of Conus crocatus Lamarck, J.B.P.A. de, 1810
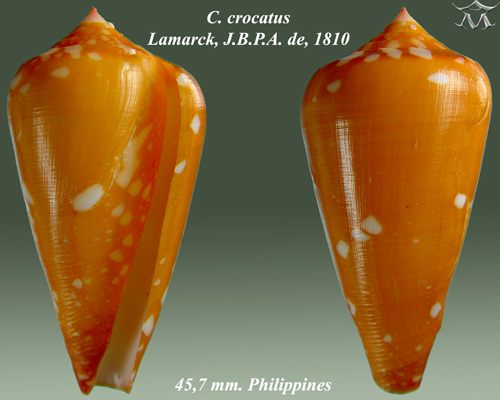

Conservation status
- Least Concern (IUCN 3.1)

Scientific classification
- Kingdom: Animalia
- Phylum: Mollusca
- Class: Gastropoda
- Subclass: Caenogastropoda
- Order: Neogastropoda
- Superfamily: Conoidea
- Family: Conidae
- Genus: Conus
- Species: C. crocatus

Binomial name
- Conus crocatus Lamarck, 1810

Synonyms
- Conus (Darioconus) crocatus Lamarck, 1810 · accepted, alternate representation; Conus crocatus crocatus Lamarck, 1810; Conus crocatus magister Doiteau, 1981; Darioconus crocatus (Lamarck, 1810); Darioconus crocatus crocatus (Lamarck, 1810)

= Conus crocatus =

Species of sea snail

Conus crocatus, common name the saffron cone, is a species of sea snail, a marine gastropod mollusk in the family Conidae, the cone snails and their allies.

Subspecies

- Conus crocatus pseudomagister (Allary & Cossignani, 2016)
- Conus crocatus thailandis Motta, A.J. da, 1978Accessed through: WoRMS

Like all species within the genus Conus, these snails are predatory and venomous. They are capable of stinging humans, therefore live ones should be handled carefully or not at all.

Synonyms

- Conus crocatus crocatus Lamarck, J.B.P.A. de, 1810: alternate representation of Conus crocatus Lamarck, 1810
- Conus crocatus magister Doiteau, C., 1981 Accessed through: WoRMS: synonym of Conus crocatus Lamarck, 1810

== Description ==
The size of the shell varies between 21 mm and 82 mm.

== Distribution ==
This marine species occurs in the Western Pacific; off Western Thailand; In the Indian Ocean off Madagascar and Mauritius.

== Gallery ==
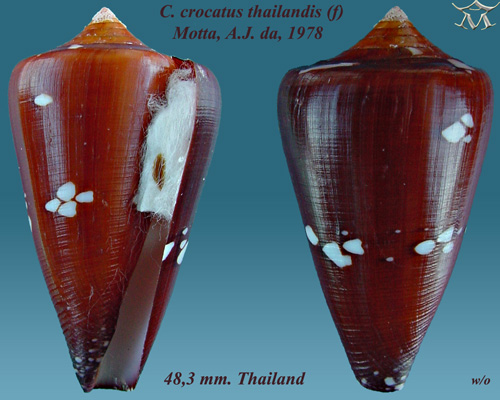
Conus crocatus thailandis Motta, A.J. da, 1978

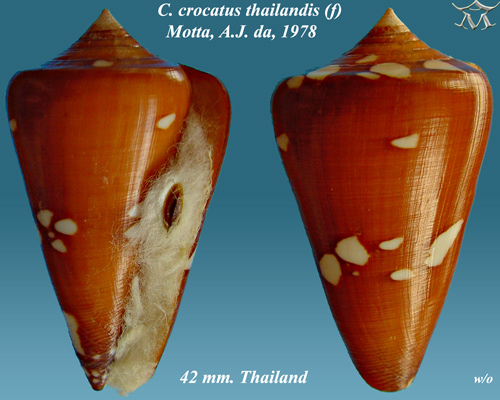
Conus crocatus thailandis Motta, A.J. da, 1978
