= Conus natalaurantius =

Scientific classification
- Kingdom: Animalia
- Phylum: Mollusca
- Class: Gastropoda
- Subclass: Caenogastropoda
- Order: Neogastropoda
- Superfamily: Conoidea
- Family: Conidae
- Genus: Conus
- Species: C. natalaurantius

Binomial name
- Conus natalaurantius (S. G. Veldsman, 2013)

Synonyms
- Conus (Darioconus) natalaurantius (S. G. Veldsman, 2013) · accepted, alternate representation; Darioconus natalaurantius S. G. Veldsman, 2013 (original combination)

Species of sea snail

Conus natalaurantius is a species of sea snail, a marine gastropod mollusk in the family Conidae, the cone snails, cone shells or cones.

These snails are predatory and venomous. They are capable of stinging humans.

== Description ==
The size of the shell varies between 35 mm and 63 mm.

== Distribution ==
This marine species occurs off KwaZulu-Natal, South Africa.
