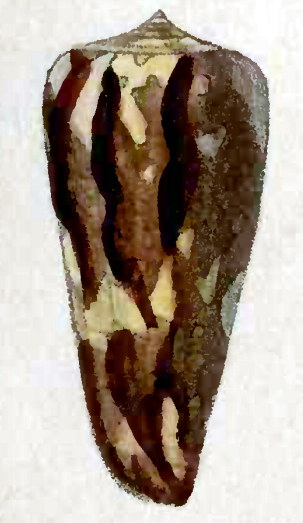
- Drawing of a shell of Conus lamberti

Scientific classification
- Domain: Eukaryota
- Kingdom: Animalia
- Phylum: Mollusca
- Class: Gastropoda
- Subclass: Caenogastropoda
- Order: Neogastropoda
- Superfamily: Conoidea
- Family: Conidae
- Genus: Conus
- Species: C. lamberti

Binomial name
- Conus lamberti Souverbie, 1877

Synonyms
- Conus (Darioconus) lamberti Souverbie, 1877 · accepted, alternate representation; Darioconus lamberti (Souverbie, 1877)

= Conus lamberti =

Species of sea snail

Conus lamberti is a species of sea snail, a marine gastropod mollusk in the family Conidae, the cone snails and their allies.

Like all species within the genus Conus, these snails are predatory and venomous. They are capable of stinging humans, therefore live ones should be handled carefully or not at all.

== Description ==
The size of the shell varies between 70 mm and 114 mm. The smooth shell is orange-brown, with large subtriangular white patches, mostly arranged so as to indicate three broad bands.

== Distribution ==
This marine species occurs off New Caledonia
