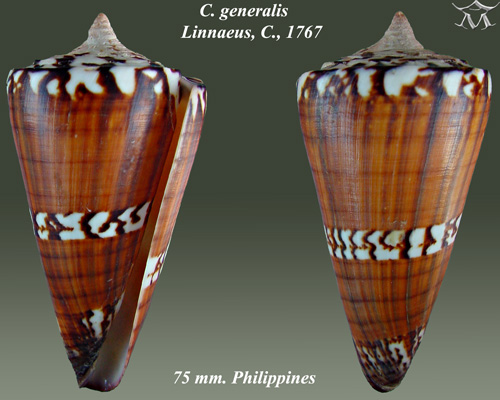
- Apertural and abapertural views of shell of Conus generalis Linnaeus, C., 1767

Conservation status
- Least Concern (IUCN 3.1)

Scientific classification
- Kingdom: Animalia
- Phylum: Mollusca
- Class: Gastropoda
- Subclass: Caenogastropoda
- Order: Neogastropoda
- Superfamily: Conoidea
- Family: Conidae
- Genus: Conus
- Species: C. generalis

Binomial name
- Conus generalis Linnaeus, 1767

Synonyms
- Conus (Strategoconus) generalis Linnaeus, 1767 accepted, alternate representation; Conus generalis var. pallida Dautzenberg, 1937; Conus generalis var. regenfussi Dautzenberg, 1937; Conus generalis var. subunicolor Dautzenberg, 1937; Conus krabiensis da Motta, 1982; Conus spiculum Reeve, 1849; Conus spirogloxus Deshayes, 1863; Cucullus dux Röding, 1798; Cucullus filosus Röding, 1798; Cucullus locumtenens Röding, 1798; Strategoconus spiculum (Reeve, L.A., 1849); Strategoconus generalis (Linnaeus, 1767)

= Conus generalis =

Species of sea snail

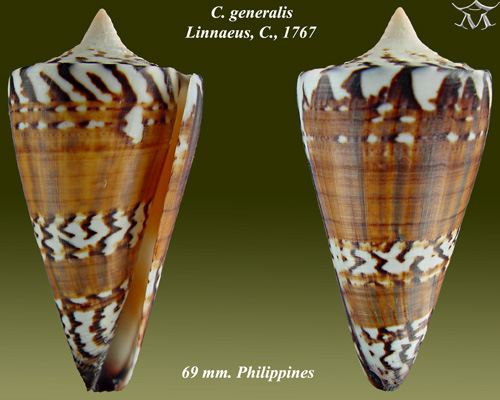
Conus generalis Linnaeus, C., 1767

Conus generalis, common name the general cone, is a species of sea snail, a marine gastropod mollusk in the family Conidae, the cone snails and their allies.

These snails are predatory and venomous. They are capable of stinging humans, therefore live ones should be handled carefully or not at all.

== Description ==
The size of an adult shell varies between 45 mm and 105 mm. The thick, broad spire is rather plane, with a characteristic, small, acuminate, raised apex. The color of the shell is orange-brown to chocolate, irregularly white-banded at the shoulder, in the middle, and at the base. These two or three bands are overlaid with zigzag or irregular chocolate-colored markings. The aperture is white.

== Distribution ==
This species occurs in various shallow substrates in the Red Sea, in the Indian Ocean off Madagascar, Mauritius and Tanzania; in the Indo-West Pacific off Indonesia and the Philippines and from Northwest Australia to French Polynesia and the Ryukyu Islands; in the Central Indian Ocean along the Maldives.

== Synonyms ==
- Conus generalis maldivus Hwass in Bruguière, 1792: synonym of Conus maldivus Hwass in Bruguière, 1792
- Conus generalis monteiroi Barros e Cunha, 1933: synonym of Conus maldivus Hwass in Bruguière, 1792
- Conus generalis var. pallida Dautzenberg, 1937: synonym of Conus generalis Linnaeus, 1767
- Conus generalis var. regenfussi Dautzenberg, 1937: synonym of Conus generalis Linnaeus, 1767
- Conus generalis var. subunicolor Dautzenberg, 1937: synonym of Conus generalis Linnaeus, 1767

== Gallery ==
Below are several color forms:

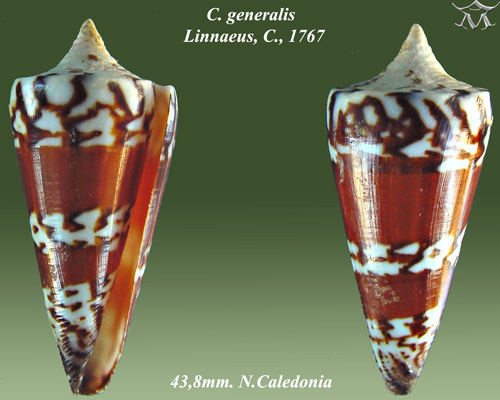
Conus generalis Linnaeus, C., 1767

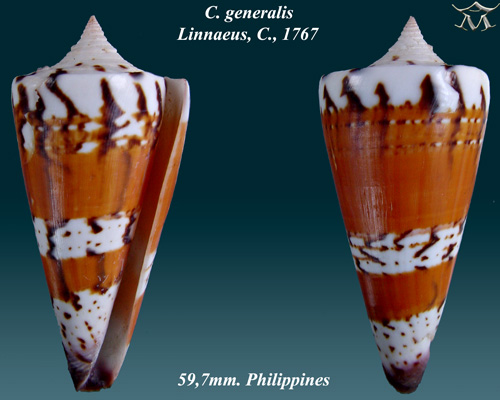
Conus generalis Linnaeus, C., 1767

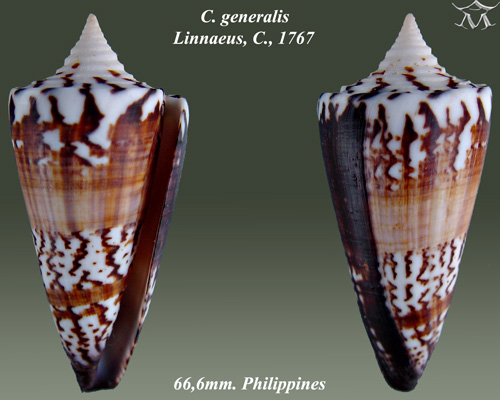
Conus generalis Linnaeus, C., 1767

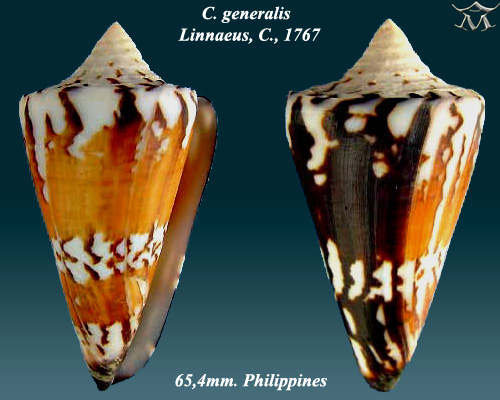
Conus generalis Linnaeus, C., 1767

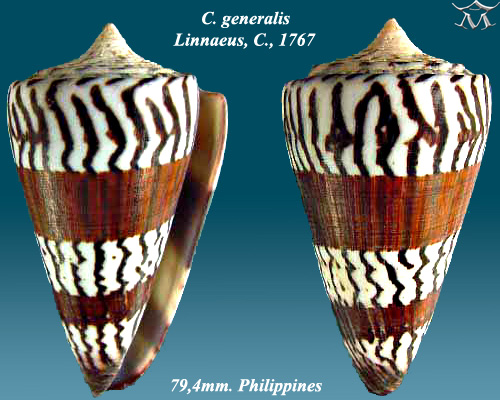
Conus generalis Linnaeus, C., 1767

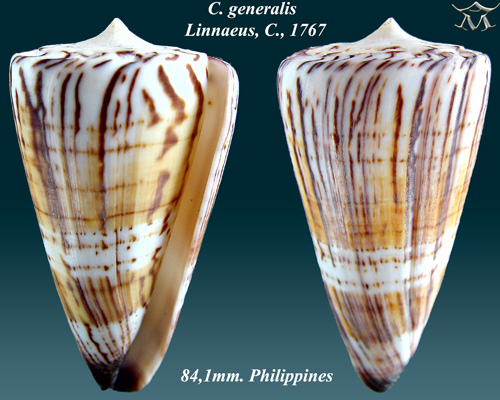
Conus generalis Linnaeus, C., 1767

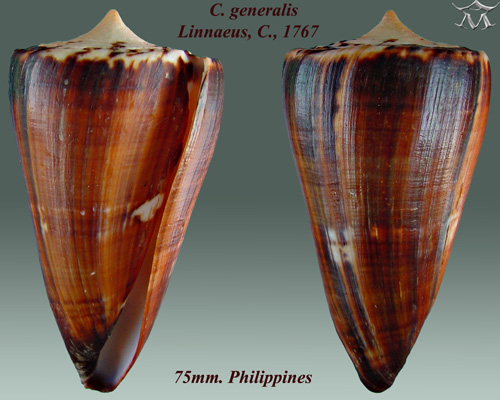
Conus generalis Linnaeus, C., 1767

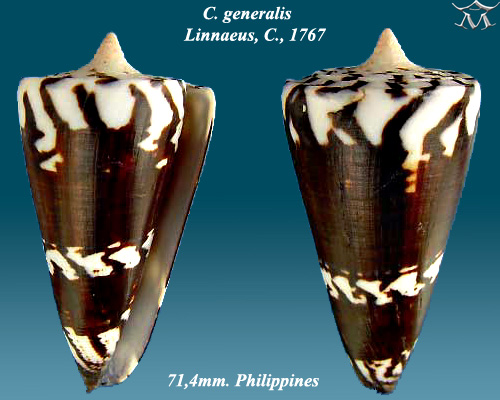
Conus generalis Linnaeus, C., 1767

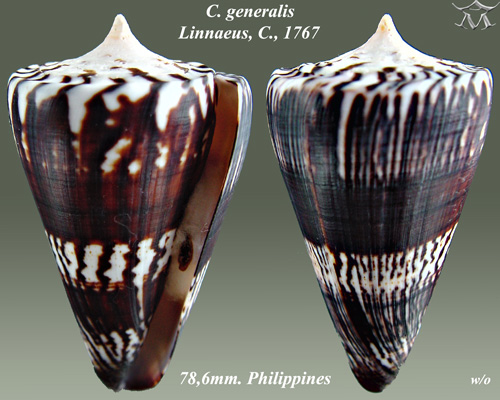
Conus generalis Linnaeus, C., 1767

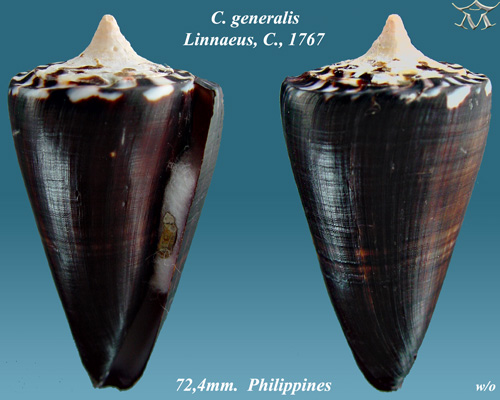
Conus generalis Linnaeus, C., 1767
