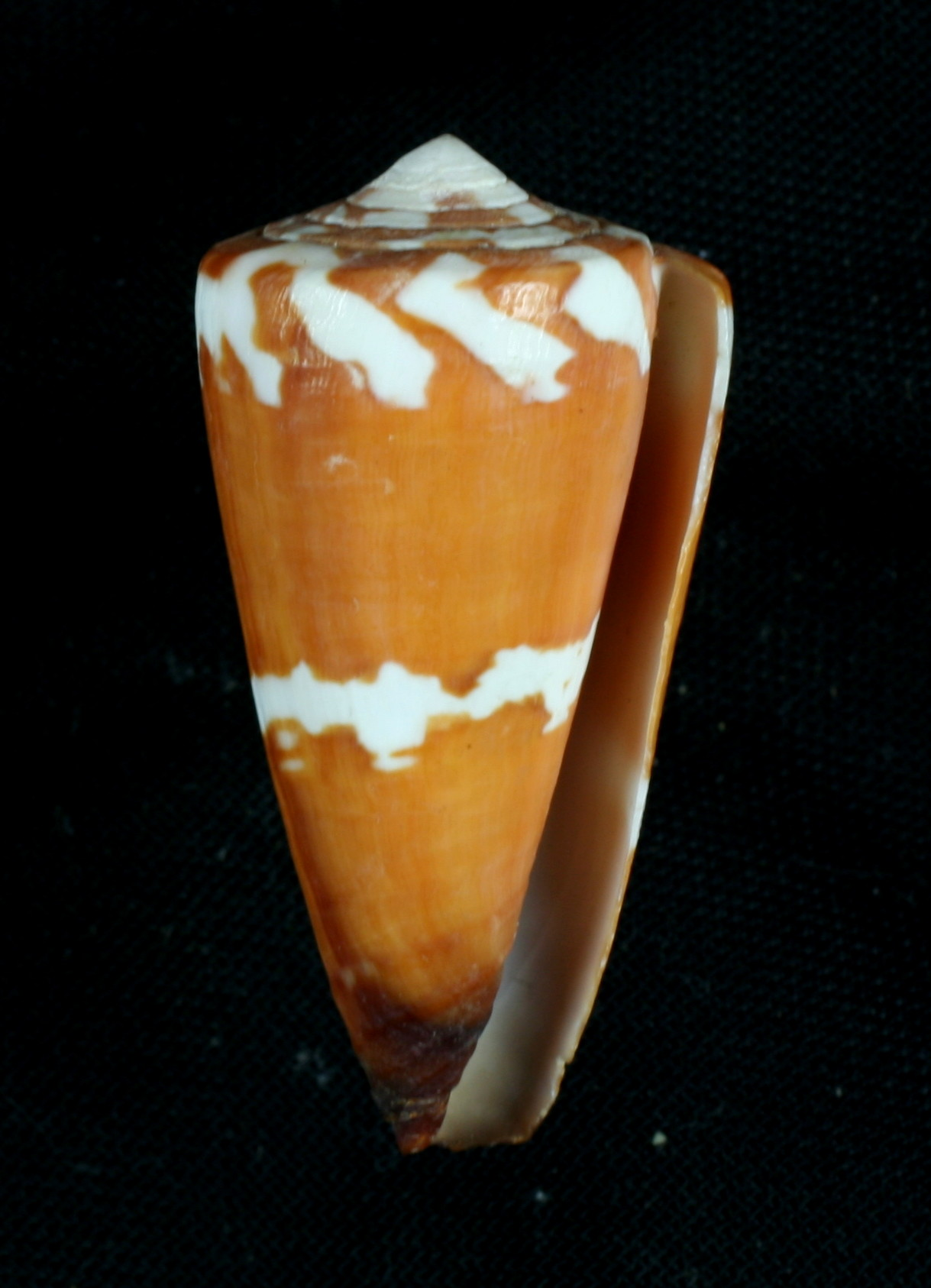
- Shell of Conus litoglyphus Hwass in Bruguière, 1792, measuring 44.3 mm in height, collected at low tide in coral sand off Zanzibar, in Africa.

Scientific classification
- Kingdom: Animalia
- Phylum: Mollusca
- Class: Gastropoda
- Subclass: Caenogastropoda
- Order: Neogastropoda
- Superfamily: Conoidea
- Family: Conidae
- Genus: Conus
- Species: C. litoglyphus

Binomial name
- Conus litoglyphus "Meuschen, F.C." Hwass, C.H. in Bruguière, J.G., 1792

Synonyms
- Conus (Strategoconus) litoglyphus Hwass in Bruguière, 1792; Conus albomaculatus G. B. Sowerby II, 1841; Conus bicolor G. B. Sowerby I, 1833 (March); Conus carpenteri Crosse, 1865; Conus inermis Tinker, 1952; Conus lacinulatus Kiener, 1845; Conus seychellensis Nevill & Nevill, 1874; Conus subcapitaneus Link, 1807; Cucullus cinamomeus Röding, 1798; Cucullus orleanus Röding, 1798; Rhizoconus seychellensis Nevill & Nevill, 1874; Strategoconus litoglyphus (Hwass in Bruguière, 1792)

= Conus litoglyphus =

Species of sea snail

Conus litoglyphus, common name the lithograph cone, is a species of predatory sea snail, a marine gastropod mollusk, more popularly known as a cone snail, cone shell or cone.

Like all species within the genus Conus, these snails are predatory and venomous. They are capable of stinging humans, therefore live ones should be handled carefully or not at all.

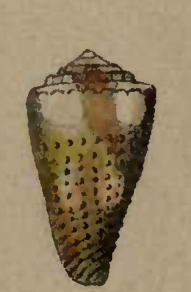
Drawing of Conus litoglyphus

== Shell description ==
The size of an adult shell varies between 35 mm and 75 mm. The thick shell is small with a low spire. It has five rows of small granules at anterior end of whorl. It is dark brown or red in color with a mottled cream banding around the shoulders and across the body whorl. The narrow aperture is white with a brown coloration at the anterior end.

== Distribution ==
This is an Indo-Pacific species, found in the Red Sea and in the Indian Ocean off Aldabra, Chagos, the Mascarene Basin and Mauritius.

== Gallery ==
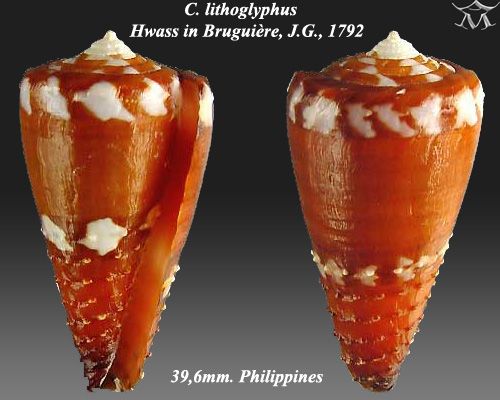
Conus litoglyphus Hwass in Bruguière, J.G., 1792

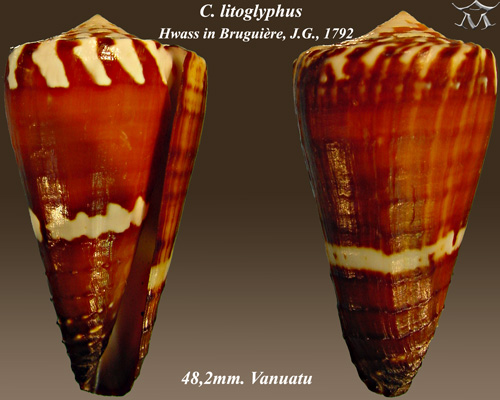
Conus litoglyphus Hwass in Bruguière, J.G., 1792

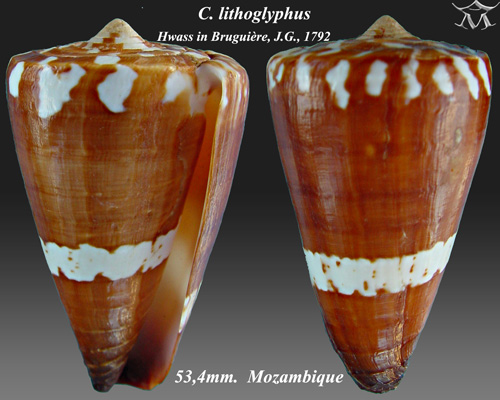
Conus litoglyphus Hwass in Bruguière, J.G., 1792

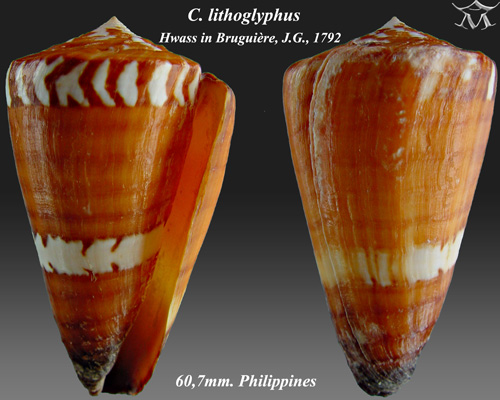
Conus litoglyphus Hwass in Bruguière, J.G., 1792
