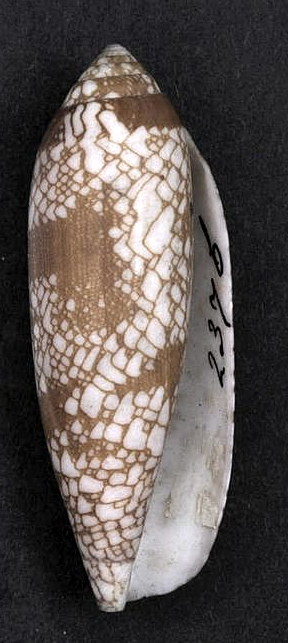
- Apertural view of a shell of Conus auratinus

Conservation status
- Data Deficient (IUCN 3.1)

Scientific classification
- Kingdom: Animalia
- Phylum: Mollusca
- Class: Gastropoda
- Subclass: Caenogastropoda
- Order: Neogastropoda
- Superfamily: Conoidea
- Family: Conidae
- Genus: Conus
- Species: C. auratinus

Binomial name
- Conus auratinus da Motta, 1982

Synonyms
- Conus (Darioconus) auratinus da Motta, 1982 · accepted, alternate representation; Conus aulicus var. roseus G. B. Sowerby I, 1834 (invalid: junior homonym of Conus roseus Fischer von Waldheim, 1807); Darioconus auratinus (da Motta, 1982)

= Conus auratinus =

Species of sea snail

Conus auratinus is a species of sea snail, a marine gastropod mollusk in the family Conidae, the cone snails and their allies.

Like all species within the genus Conus, these snails are predatory and venomous. They are capable of stinging humans, therefore live ones should be handled carefully or not at all.

== Description ==
The shell of Conus auratinus ranges in size from about 55 mm to 120 mm. It is a relatively large cone snail. Live specimens are rarely seen; many known examples are from dead or empty shells. The shell is smooth, and the species belongs to the "tented cones," which tend to have elongated, narrow apertures and often display delicate patterning.

== Distribution ==
This species occurs in the Central and the West Pacific Ocean.
