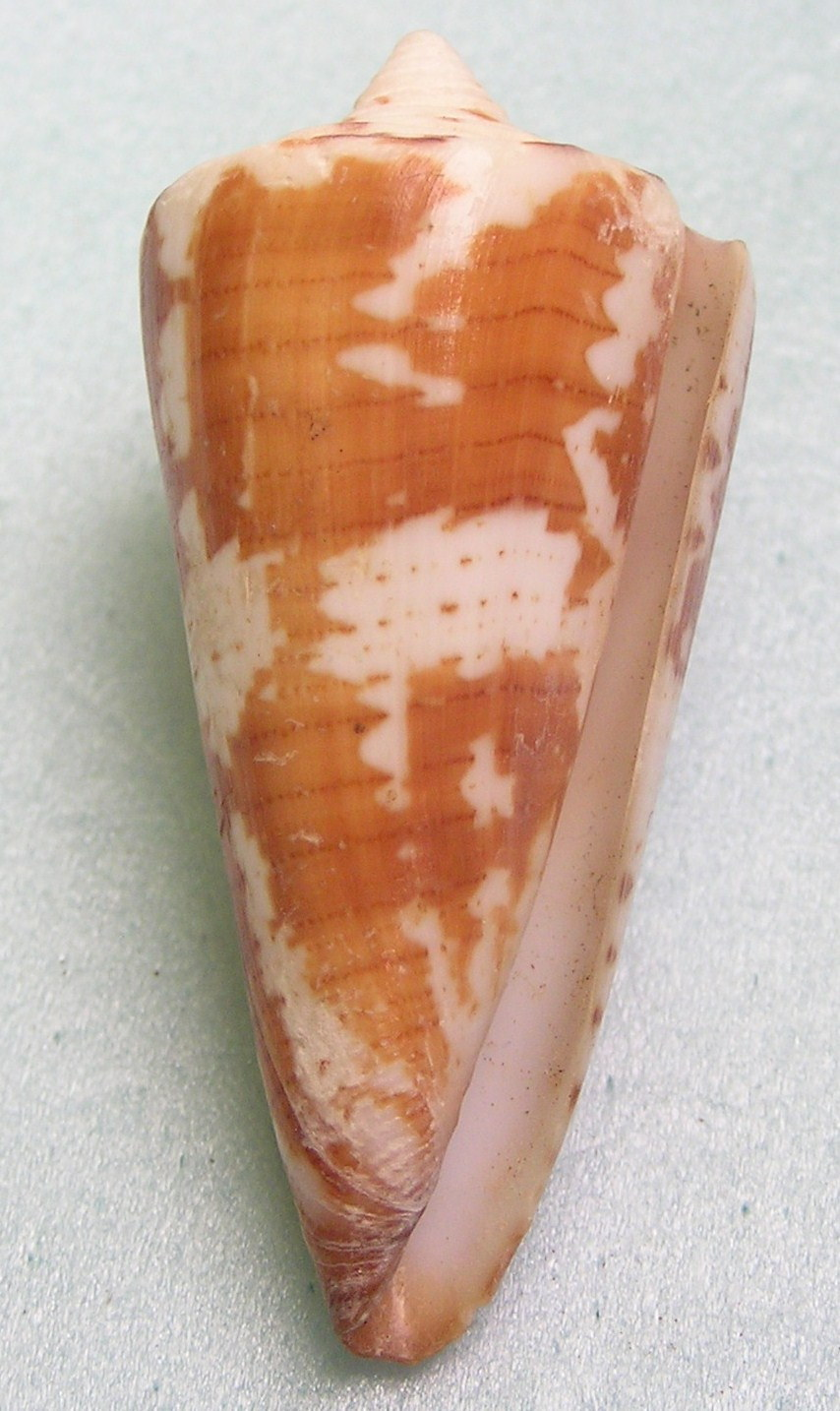
- Apertural view of a shell of Conus maldivus

Conservation status
- Least Concern (IUCN 3.1)

Scientific classification
- Kingdom: Animalia
- Phylum: Mollusca
- Class: Gastropoda
- Subclass: Caenogastropoda
- Order: Neogastropoda
- Superfamily: Conoidea
- Family: Conidae
- Genus: Conus
- Species: C. maldivus

Binomial name
- Conus maldivus Hwass in Bruguière, 1792

Synonyms
- Conus (Strategoconus) maldivus Hwass in Bruguière, 1792 · accepted, alternate representation; Conus dux Röding, 1798 (invalid: junior homonym of Conus dux Hwass, 1792); Conus generalis maldivus Hwass in Bruguière, 1792; Conus generalis monteiroi Barros e Cunha, 1933; Conus planaxis Deshayes, 1863; Conus spirogloxus Deshayes, 1863; Cucullus dux Röding, 1798; Cucullus filosus Röding, 1798; Strategoconus maldivus (Hwass in Bruguière, 1792)

= Conus maldivus =

Species of sea snail

Conus maldivus, common name the Maldive cone, is a species of sea snail, a marine gastropod mollusk in the family Conidae, the cone snails, cone shells or cones.

These snails are predatory and venomous. They are capable of stinging humans.

== Description ==
The size of the shell varies between 18 mm and 83 mm. The shell is encircled by distant revolving lines of small spots. It is sometimes irregularly clouded with white, not forming bands. At other times it is irregularly banded.

== Distribution ==
This marine species occurs in the Red Sea and in the Western Indian Ocean off the Mascarene Basin, the Maldives and Sri Lanka.
