= Conus echo =

Conservation status
- Least Concern (IUCN 3.1)

Scientific classification
- Kingdom: Animalia
- Phylum: Mollusca
- Class: Gastropoda
- Subclass: Caenogastropoda
- Order: Neogastropoda
- Superfamily: Conoidea
- Family: Conidae
- Genus: Conus
- Species: C. echo

Binomial name
- Conus echo Lauer, 1989

Synonyms
- Conus (Darioconus) echo Lauer, 1989 · accepted, alternate representation; Conus pennaceus echo Lauer, 1988; Conus pennaceus f. echo Maccà, 1988 (unavailable name: established as a form); Darioconus echo (Lauer, 1989)

Species of sea snail

Conus echo is a species of sea snail, a marine gastropod mollusk in the family Conidae, the cone snails, cone shells or cones.

Like all species within the genus Conus, these snails are predatory and venomous. They are capable of stinging humans, therefore live ones should be handled carefully or not at all.

== Description ==
The size of the shell varies between 38 mm and 69 mm.

== Distribution ==
This species occurs in the Indian Ocean off Somalia.
