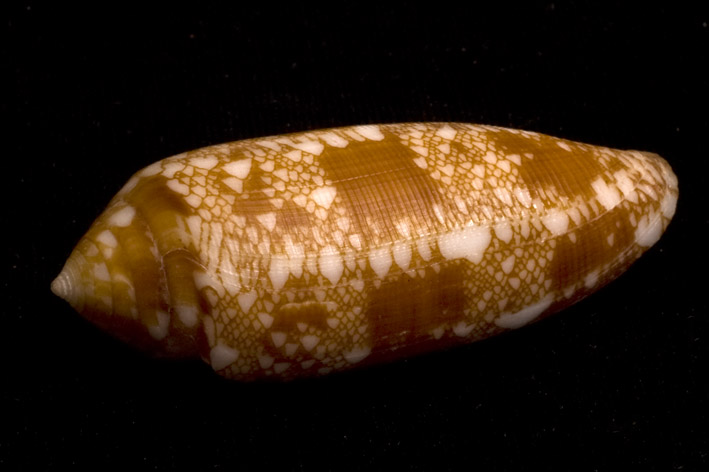
- Shell of Conus auricomus

Conservation status
- Least Concern (IUCN 3.1)

Scientific classification
- Kingdom: Animalia
- Phylum: Mollusca
- Class: Gastropoda
- Subclass: Caenogastropoda
- Order: Neogastropoda
- Superfamily: Conoidea
- Family: Conidae
- Genus: Conus
- Species: C. auricomus

Binomial name
- Conus auricomus Hwass in Bruguière, 1792

Synonyms
- Conus (Darioconus) auricomus Hwass in Bruguière, 1792 · accepted, alternate representation; Conus dactylosus Kiener, 1845; Conus debilis Fenaux, 1943 (invalid: junior homonym of Conus mediterraneus var. debilis Monterosato, 1917); Darioconus auricomus (Hwass in Bruguière, 1792)

= Conus auricomus =

Species of sea snail

Conus auricomus, common name the gold-leaf cone, is a species of sea snail, a marine gastropod mollusk in the family Conidae, the cone snails and their allies.

Like all species within the genus Conus, these snails are predatory and venomous. They are capable of stinging humans, therefore live ones should be handled carefully or not at all.

== Description ==
The size of the shell varies between 32 mm and 69 mm. The cylindrical shell shows revolving striae throughout. Its reticulated pattern uniform in the size of the meshes, interrupted by three or four broad, uniform orange-brown bands. The convex spire is maculated.

== Distribution ==
This species occurs in the Indian Ocean off the Mascarene Basin.
