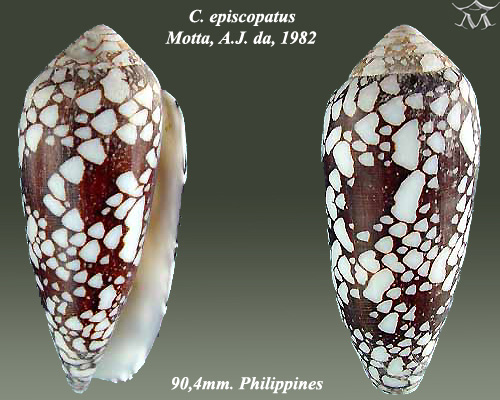
- Apertural and abapertural views of shell of Conus episcopatus Motta, A.J. da, 1982

Conservation status
- Least Concern (IUCN 3.1)

Scientific classification
- Kingdom: Animalia
- Phylum: Mollusca
- Class: Gastropoda
- Subclass: Caenogastropoda
- Order: Neogastropoda
- Superfamily: Conoidea
- Family: Conidae
- Genus: Conus
- Species: C. episcopatus

Binomial name
- Conus episcopatus Da Motta, 1982

Synonyms
- Conus (Darioconus) episcopatus da Motta, 1982 · accepted, alternate representation; Conus episcopatus pupillaris da Motta, 1982; Conus episcopus var. elongatus Adam & Leloup, 1937 (invalid: junior homonym of Conus elongatus Holten, 1802; C. episcopus var. oblongus Fenaux, 1942, C. episcopatus pupillaris da Motta, 1982, and C. magnificus macilentus Lauer, 1989, are replacement names); Conus episcopus var. oblongus Fenaux, 1942; Conus magnificus macilentus Lauer, 1989; Darioconus episcopatus (da Motta, 1982)

= Conus episcopatus =

Species of sea snail

Conus episcopatus, the dignified cone, is a species of sea snail, a marine gastropod mollusk in the family Conidae, the cone snails and their allies.

Like all species within the genus Conus, these snails are predatory and venomous. They are capable of stinging humans, therefore live ones should be handled with care.

== Description ==
The size of the shell varies between 40 mm and 115 mm. The shell of Conus Episcopatus is elongated and has a high spire, which means that it has a tall apex. The shell is relatively thick and heavy, with a glossy surface and a series of raised ridges or ribs that run along its length. The overall shape of the shell is conical, with a pointed apex and a wider base.

The coloration of the shell can vary widely, but it basically has a base color of white or cream, with a series of darker or lighter bands, blotches, or spots that form complex patterns. The patterns can be quite intricate and unique, which is one reason why cone snails are prized by collectors.

Like all cone snails, Conus Episcopatus is venomous and uses its venom to immobilize and kill its prey. Venom is delivered through a harpoon-like structure called a radula tooth located on the proboscis of the snail. The venom of some species of cone snail can be highly toxic and dangerous to humans, and care must be taken when handling them.

Conus episcopatus is found in tropical and subtropical waters of the western Atlantic Ocean from the Gulf of Mexico to the Caribbean Sea. It lives in coral reefs and other shallow marine environments, where it feeds on other small marine invertebrates such as worms, molluscs, and crustaceans.

== Distribution ==
This marine species occurs in the tropical Indo-West Pacific, off the Mascarenes; off India; and off Australia (Queensland).

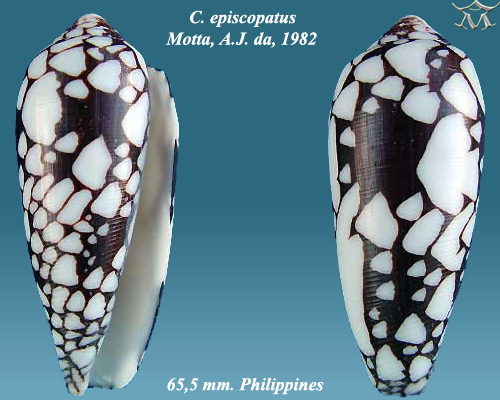
Conus episcopatus Motta, A.J. da, 1982

== Gallery ==
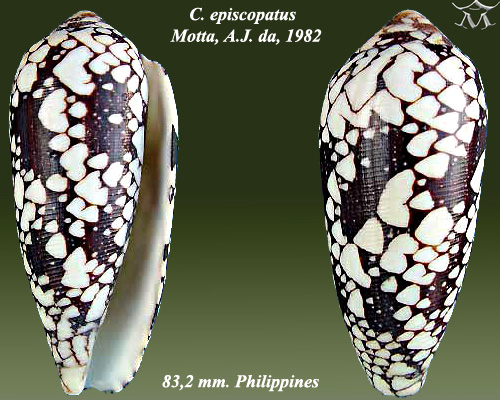
Conus episcopatus Motta, A.J. da, 1982

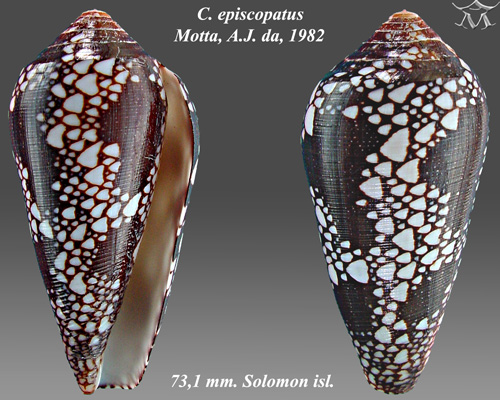
Conus episcopatus Motta, A.J. da, 1982

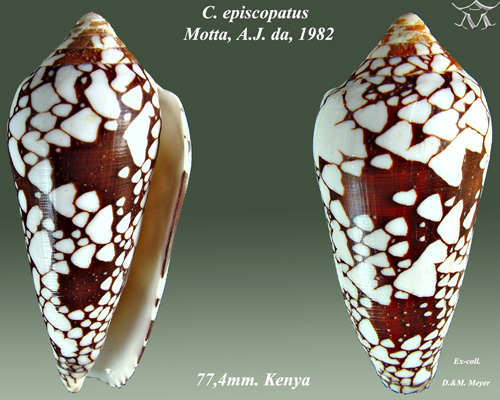
Conus episcopatus Motta, A.J. da, 1982

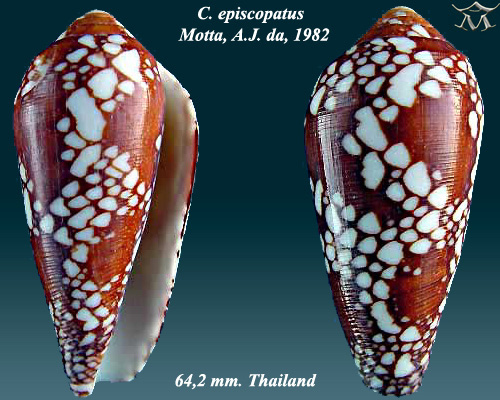
Conus episcopatus Motta, A.J. da, 1982
