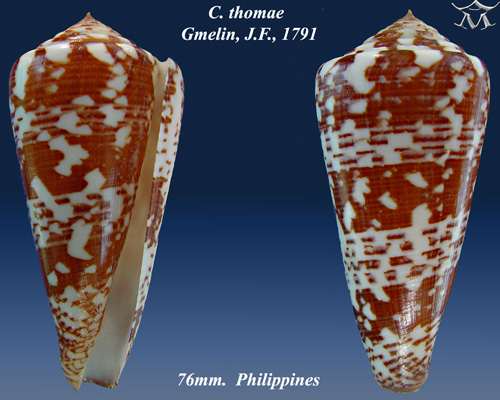
- Apertural and abapertural views of shell of Conus thomae Gmelin, J.F., 1791
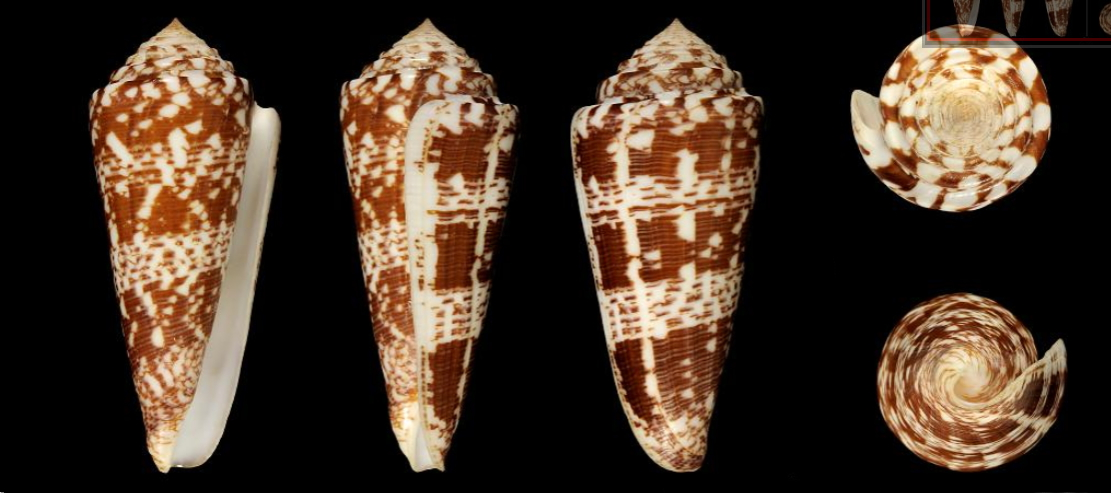

Scientific classification
- Domain: Eukaryota
- Kingdom: Animalia
- Phylum: Mollusca
- Class: Gastropoda
- Subclass: Caenogastropoda
- Order: Neogastropoda
- Superfamily: Conoidea
- Family: Conidae
- Genus: Conus
- Species: C. thomae

Binomial name
- Conus thomae Gmelin, 1791

Synonyms
- Conus (Darioconus) thomae Gmelin, 1791 · accepted, alternate representation; Conus jousseaumei Couturier, 1891; Conus omaicus Hwass in Bruguière, 1792; Strategoconus thomae (Gmelin, 1791); Thalassiconus thomae (Gmelin, 1791)

= Conus thomae =

Species of sea snail

Conus thomae, common name St. Thomas cone, is a species of sea snail, a marine gastropod mollusk in the family Conidae, the cone snails and their allies.

Like all species within the genus Conus, these snails are predatory and venomous. They are noted for their potent stings, making the Conus thomae potentially dangerous to humans.

== Description ==
The size of the shell varies between 55 mm and 97 mm. The narrow shell is whitish, encircled by numerous hues of square spots and dashes of orange-brown, often forming two or three broad bands by their approximation.

== Distribution ==
This marine species occurs in the Indian Ocean and off the Moluccas and the Philippines.
