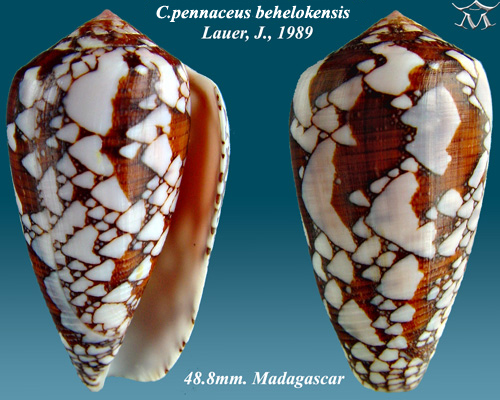
- Apertural and abapertural view of a shell of Conus behelokensis

Scientific classification
- Kingdom: Animalia
- Phylum: Mollusca
- Class: Gastropoda
- Subclass: Caenogastropoda
- Order: Neogastropoda
- Superfamily: Conoidea
- Family: Conidae
- Genus: Conus
- Species: C. behelokensis

Binomial name
- Conus behelokensis Lauer, 1989

Synonyms
- Conus (Darioconus) behelokensis Lauer, 1989 · accepted, alternate representation; Conus pennaceus behelokensis Lauer, 1989 (original rank); Darioconus behelokensis (Lauer, 1989); Darioconus behelokensis f. pseudoracemosus Bozzetti, 2012; Darioconus pseudoracemosus (Bozzetti, 2012) ·

= Conus behelokensis =

Species of sea snail

Conus behelokensis is a species of sea snail, a marine gastropod mollusk in the family Conidae, the cone snails, cone shells or cones.

These snails are predatory and venomous. They are capable of stinging humans.

== Description ==
The size of the shell varies between 34 mm and 65 mm.

== Distribution ==
This marine species of cone snail occurs in the Western Indian Ocean.
