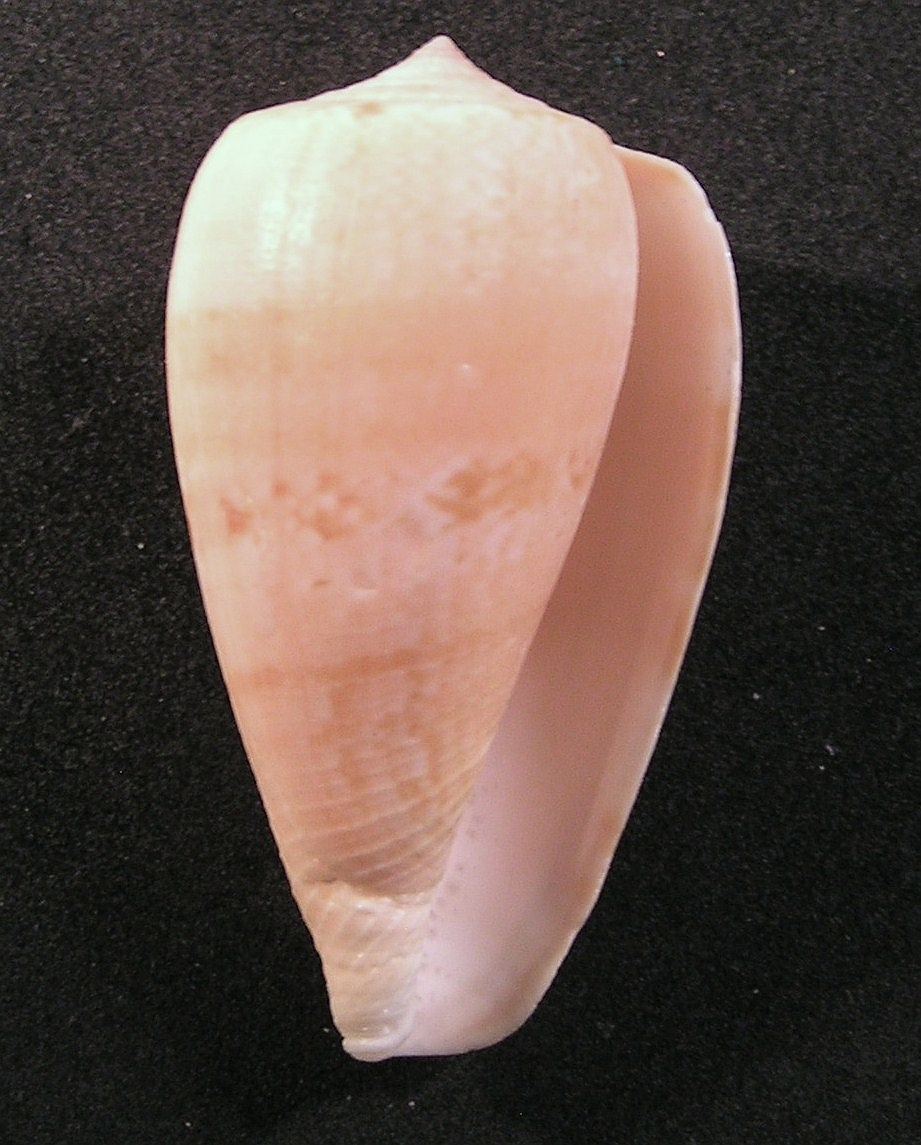
- Apertural view of a shell of Conus anemone f. peronianus

Scientific classification
- Kingdom: Animalia
- Phylum: Mollusca
- Class: Gastropoda
- Subclass: Caenogastropoda
- Order: Neogastropoda
- Family: Conidae
- Genus: Conus
- Subgenus: Floraconus; Iredale, 1930

Type species
- Conus anemone Lamarck, 1810

Synonyms
- Dendroconus (Ketyconus) da Motta, 1991; Floraconus Iredale, 1930; Ketyconus da Motta, 1991

= Conus (Floraconus) =

Subgenus of gastropods

Floraconus is a subgenus of sea snails, marine gastropod mollusks in the genus Conus, family Conidae, the cone snails and their allies.

In the latest classification of the family Conidae by Puillandre N., Duda T.F., Meyer C., Olivera B.M. & Bouchet P. (2015), Floraconus has become a subgenus of Conus as Conus (Floraconus) represented as Conus Linnaeus, 1758

== Distinguishing characteristics ==
The Tucker & Tenorio 2009 taxonomy distinguishes Floraconus from Conus in the following ways:

- Genus Conus sensu stricto Linnaeus, 1758

Shell characters (living and fossil species)

The basic shell shape is conical to elongated conical, has a deep anal notch on the shoulder, a smooth periostracum and a small operculum. The shoulder of the shell is usually nodulose and the protoconch is usually multispiral. Markings often include the presence of tents except for black or white color variants, with the absence of spiral lines of minute tents and textile bars.

Radular tooth (not known for fossil species)

The radula has an elongated anterior section with serrations and a large exposed terminating cusp, a non-obvious waist, blade is either small or absent and has a short barb, and lacks a basal spur.

Geographical distribution

These species are found in the Indo-Pacific region.

Feeding habits

These species eat other gastropods including cones.

- Subgenus Floraconus Iredale, 1930

Shell characters (living and fossil species)

The shell is turgid to conical in shape. The protoconch is paucispiral, and the spire whorl tops have cords. Nodules are either absent or die out in early whorls. The dentiform plait may be small or absent. The anal notch is shallow, and the anterior notch is slight or absent. The periostracum may be smooth or tufted, and the operculum is moderate to small.

Radular tooth (not known for fossil species)

The anterior section of the radular tooth may be equal to or slightly longer than the posterior section. The blade is short to moderate extending about one-third to one-half the length of the anterior section. The basal spur is present, and the barb is short. The radular tooth has a single row of serrations.

Geographical distribution

The species in this genus are endemic to Australia.

Feeding habits

These cone snails are vermivorous (meaning that the cones prey on marine worms) feeding upon polychaete worms.

== Species list ==
This list of species is based on the information in the World Register of Marine Species (WoRMS) list. Species within the genus Floraconus include:

- Floraconus anemone (Lamarck, 1810) represented as Conus anemone Lamarck, 1810
- Floraconus aplustre (Reeve, 1843) represented as Conus aplustre Reeve, 1843
- Floraconus ardisiaceus Kiener, 1850 : synonym of Conus (Floraconus) ardisiaceus Kiener, 1850, represented as Conus ardisiaceus Kiener, 1850
- Floraconus balteatus G. B. Sowerby I, 1833 : synonym of Conus (Floraconus) balteatus G. B. Sowerby I, 1833, represented as Conus balteatus G. B. Sowerby I, 1833
- Floraconus cocceus (Reeve, 1844) represented as Conus cocceus Reeve, 1844
- Floraconus compressus G. B. Sowerby II, 1866 : synonym of Conus (Floraconus) compressus G. B. Sowerby II, 1866, represented as Conus compressus G. B. Sowerby II, 1866
- Floraconus gabelishi (da Motta & Ninomiya, 1982) represented as Conus gabelishi da Motta & Ninomiya, 1982
- Floraconus klemae (Cotton, 1953): synonym of Conus (Klemaeconus) klemae (Cotton, 1953), represented as Conus klemae (Cotton, 1953)
- Floraconus mozambicus Hwass in Bruguière, 1792: synonym of Conus (Floraconus) mozambicus Hwass in Bruguière, 1792, represented as Conus mozambicus Hwass in Bruguière, 1792
- Floraconus novaehollandiae(A. Adams, 1855) represented as Conus anemone novaehollandiae A. Adams, 1855
- Floraconus papilliferus (G.B. Sowerby I, 1834): synonym of Conus (Floraconus) papilliferus G. B. Sowerby I, 1834, represented as Conus papilliferus G. B. Sowerby I, 1834
- Floraconus rufimaculosus (Macpherson, 1959): synonym of Conus (Klemaeconus) rufimaculosus Macpherson, 1959 represented as Conus rufimaculosus Macpherson, 1959
- Floraconus tinianus Hwass in Bruguière, 1792 : synonym of Conus (Floraconus) tinianus Hwass in Bruguière, 1792, represented as Conus tinianus Hwass in Bruguière, 1792
