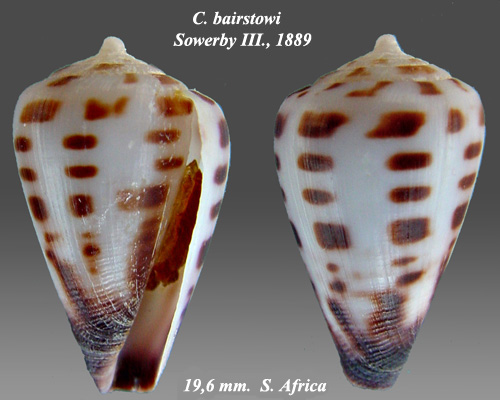
- Apertural and abapertural views of shell of Conus bairstowi (Sowerby III, 1889)

Scientific classification
- Kingdom: Animalia
- Phylum: Mollusca
- Class: Gastropoda
- Subclass: Caenogastropoda
- Order: Neogastropoda
- Family: Conidae
- Genus: Conus
- Subgenus: Sciteconus da Motta, 1991

Type species
- Conus algoensis G. B. Sowerby I, 1834

Synonyms
- Sciteconus da Motta, 1991

= Conus (Sciteconus) =

Subgenus of gastropods

Sciteconus is a subgenus of sea snails, marine gastropod mollusks in the genus Conus, family Conidae, the cone snails and their allies.

In the latest classification of the family Conidae by Puillandre N., Duda T.F., Meyer C., Olivera B.M. & Bouchet P. (2015), Sciteconus has become a subgenus of Conus as Conus (Sciteconus)da Motta, 1991 (type species: Conus algoensis G. B. Sowerby I, 1834) represented as Conus Linnaeus, 1758

== Species ==
- Sciteconus algoensis (G.B. Sowerby I, 1834) represented as Conus algoensis G. B. Sowerby I, 1834 (alternate representation)
- Sciteconus bairstowi (G.B. Sowerby III, 1889) represented as Conus bairstowi G. B. Sowerby III, 1889 (alternate representation)
- Sciteconus brianhayesi (Korn, 2001) represented as Conus brianhayesi Korn, 2001 (alternate representation)
- Sciteconus gradatulus (Weinkauff, 1875) represented as Conus gradatulus Weinkauff, 1875 (alternate representation)
- Sciteconus infrenatus (Reeve, 1848) represented as Conus infrenatus Reeve, 1848 (alternate representation)
- Sciteconus mozambicus (Hwass in Bruguière, 1792) represented as Conus mozambicus Hwass in Bruguière, 1792 (alternate representation)
- Sciteconus pictus (Reeve, 1843) represented as Conus pictus Reeve, 1843 (alternate representation)
