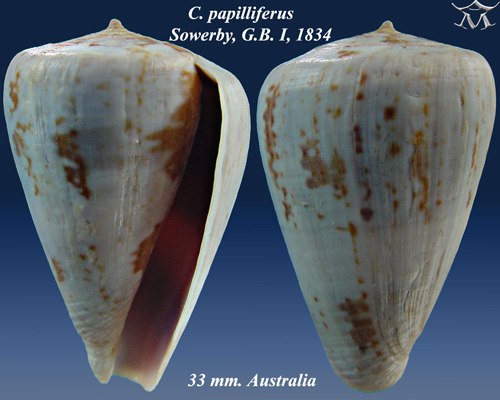
- Apertural and abapertural views of shell of Conus papilliferus Sowerby, G.B. I, 1834
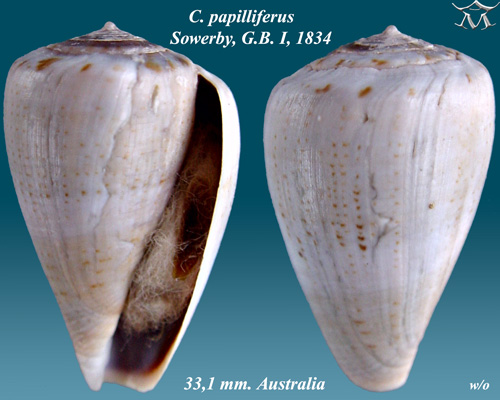

Scientific classification
- Kingdom: Animalia
- Phylum: Mollusca
- Class: Gastropoda
- Subclass: Caenogastropoda
- Order: Neogastropoda
- Superfamily: Conoidea
- Family: Conidae
- Genus: Conus
- Species: C. papilliferus

Binomial name
- Conus papilliferus G. B. Sowerby I, 1834

Synonyms
- Conus (Floraconus) papilliferus G. B. Sowerby I, 1834 · accepted, alternate representation; Conus comptus A. Adams, 1855 (Invalid: junior homonym of Conus comptus Gould, 1853); Conus jukesii Reeve, 1848; Conus rossiteri Brazier, 1870; Floraconus papilliferus (G. B. Sowerby I, 1834)

= Conus papilliferus =

Species of sea snail

Conus papilliferus, common name the papilla cone, is a species of sea snail, a marine gastropod mollusk in the family Conidae, the cone snails and their allies.

== Description ==
The shell of Conus papilliferus is relatively small to medium-sized, with adult shells varying in size between 20 mm and 50 mm. The shell is characterized by its conical shape and intricate patterns. The coloration of the shell can vary, but it typically features a combination of light and dark hues that provide camouflage against the seabed. The aperture is narrow, and the outer lip is thin and slightly flared.

== Distribution ==
This marine species is endemic to Australia and occurs in the shallow subtidal zone off New South Wales, Queensland and Victoria.
