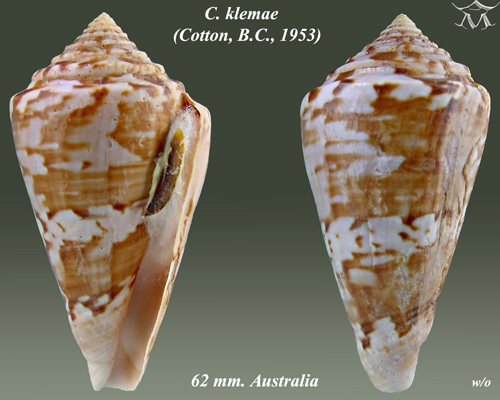
- Apertural and abapertural views of shell of Conus klemae (Cotton, B.C., 1953)
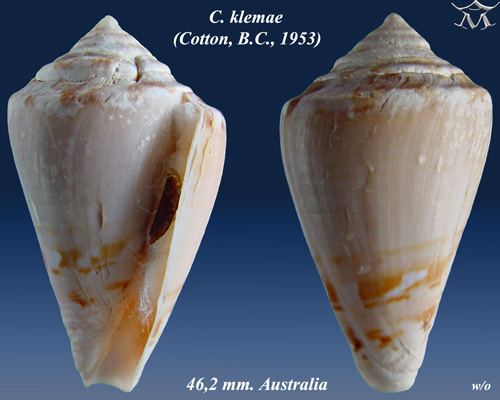

Conservation status
- Least Concern (IUCN 3.1)

Scientific classification
- Kingdom: Animalia
- Phylum: Mollusca
- Class: Gastropoda
- Subclass: Caenogastropoda
- Order: Neogastropoda
- Superfamily: Conoidea
- Family: Conidae
- Genus: Conus
- Species: C. klemae

Binomial name
- Conus klemae (Cotton, 1953)

Synonyms
- Conus (Klemaeconus) klemae (Cotton, 1953) · accepted, alternate representation; Conus coralinus Habe & Kosuge, 1970; Floraconus klemae (Cotton, 1953); Klemaeconus klemae (Cotton, 1953); Rhizoconus klemae Cotton, 1953 (original combination); Rhizoconus coralinus Habe, T. & Kosuge, S. 1970 (junior homonym of Conus corallinus Kiener, 1845)

= Conus klemae =

Species of sea snail

Conus klemae, common name the Clem's cone, is a species of sea snail, a marine gastropod mollusk in the family Conidae, the cone snails and their allies.

Like all species within the genus Conus, these snails are predatory and venomous. They are capable of stinging humans, therefore live ones should be handled carefully or not at all.

== Description ==
The size of the shell varies between 25 mm and 86 mm. A rare yellow colour form is known.

== Distribution ==
The Flindersian Molluscan Province.

This marine species is endemic to South Australia and Western Australia.
