= Conus gabelishi =

Conservation status
- Least Concern (IUCN 3.1)

Scientific classification
- Kingdom: Animalia
- Phylum: Mollusca
- Class: Gastropoda
- Subclass: Caenogastropoda
- Order: Neogastropoda
- Superfamily: Conoidea
- Family: Conidae
- Genus: Conus
- Species: C. gabelishi

Binomial name
- Conus gabelishi da Motta, 1982

Synonyms
- Conus (Floraconus) gabelishi da Motta & Ninomiya, in da Motta, 1982 accepted, alternate representation; Floraconus gabelishi (da Motta & Ninomiya, in da Motta, 1982)

Species of sea snail

Conus gabelishi is a species of sea snail, a marine gastropod mollusk in the family Conidae, the cone snails and their allies. It gets its name from the researcher who discovered it, A.J. Gabelish.

Like all species within the genus Conus, these snails are predatory and venomous. They are capable of stinging humans, therefore live ones should be handled carefully or not at all.

== Description ==
The size of an adult shell varies between 23 mm and 43 mm. The shell is turbinated and smooth, with eight stepped spiral whorls. The shell is a golden yellow with nine thin rows of brown and white bands as well as three indistinct white splotches.

== Distribution ==
This marine species is endemic to Australia and occurs off Western Australia at depths of 130-230m below sealevel.
