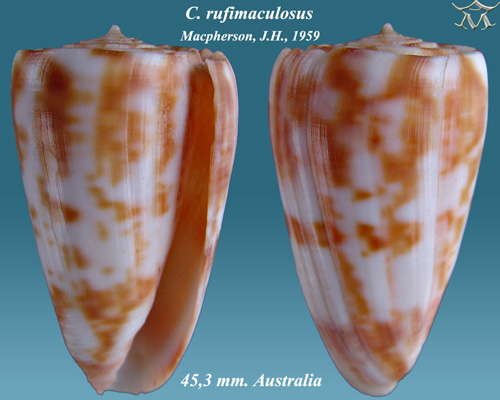
- Apertural and abapertural views of shell of Conus rufimaculosus Macpherson, J.H., 1959

Conservation status
- Least Concern (IUCN 3.1)

Scientific classification
- Kingdom: Animalia
- Phylum: Mollusca
- Class: Gastropoda
- Subclass: Caenogastropoda
- Order: Neogastropoda
- Superfamily: Conoidea
- Family: Conidae
- Genus: Conus
- Species: C. rufimaculosus

Binomial name
- Conus rufimaculosus Macpherson, 1959

Synonyms
- Conus (Klemaeconus) rufimaculosus Macpherson, 1959 · accepted, alternate representation; Floraconus rufimaculosus (Macpherson, 1959); Klemaeconus rufimaculosus (Macpherson, 1959)

= Conus rufimaculosus =

Species of sea snail

Conus rufimaculosus, also known as the red-stained cone, is a species of sea snail, a marine gastropod mollusk in the family Conidae, the cone snails and their allies.

Like all species within the genus Conus, these snails are predatory and venomous. They are capable of stinging humans, therefore live ones should be handled carefully or not at all.

== Description ==
The size of the shell is typically between 30-45 millimeters, though reaching up to 58 millimeters. The shell is typically a medium to heavy weight. The shell has a white base color with orange-brown blotches and aerial zigzag streaks covering it. In the deep interior, the aperture is pink, at the lip, it is white.

== Distribution ==
This marine species is endemic to Australia and occurs off New South Wales and Queensland.
