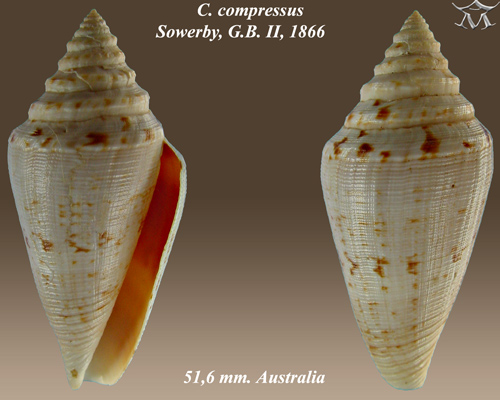
- Apertural and abapertural views of shell of Conus compressus Sowerby, G.B. II, 1866
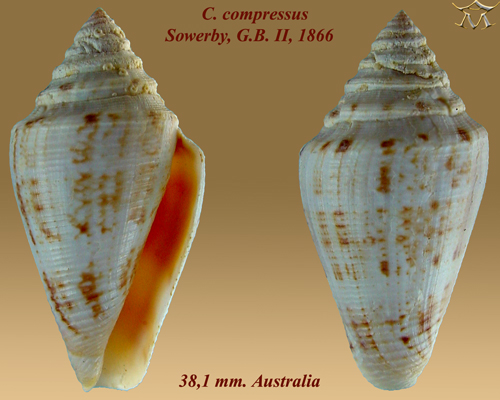

Conservation status
- Vulnerable (IUCN 3.1)

Scientific classification
- Kingdom: Animalia
- Phylum: Mollusca
- Class: Gastropoda
- Subclass: Caenogastropoda
- Order: Neogastropoda
- Superfamily: Conoidea
- Family: Conidae
- Genus: Conus
- Species: C. compressus

Binomial name
- Conus compressus G. B. Sowerby II, 1866

Synonyms
- Conus (Floraconus) compressus G. B. Sowerby II, 1866 · accepted, alternate representation; Conus anemone compressus G. B. Sowerby II, 1866; Conus atractus Tomlin, 1937; Conus fusiformis Lamarck, 1810 (Invalid: junior homonym of Conus fusiformis Fischer von Waldheim, 1807; C. atractus is a replacement name)

= Conus compressus =

Species of sea snail

Conus compressus is a species of sea snail, a marine gastropod mollusk in the family Conidae, the cone snails and their allies.

The database WoRMS lists this species only tentatively, as it may be a synonym for a northern form of Conus anemone. As there are conservation implications, a precautionary approach should be taken, and C. compressus is here tentatively listed as a valid species. The real C. compressus has a distribution restricted from Geraldton to Shark Bay, but in recent years the name has been mistakenly applied to a tall-spired form of anemone from South Australia.

Like all cone snail species, these snails are predatory and venomous. They are capable of stinging humans, therefore live ones should be handled carefully or not at all.

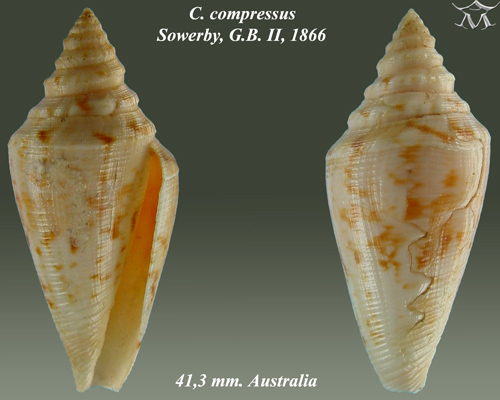
Conus compressus Sowerby, G.B. II, 1866

== Description ==
The size of the shell varies between 25 mm and 67 mm.

== Distribution ==
This marine species occurs off Southern Australia.
