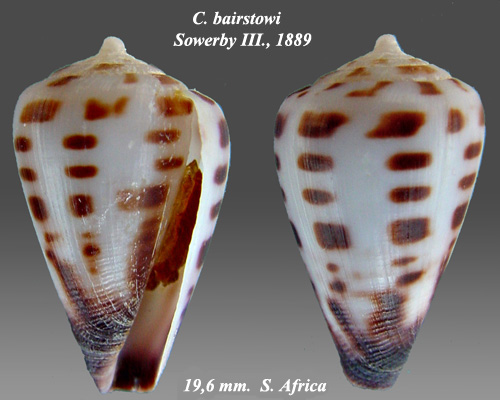
- Apertural and abapertural views of shell of Conus bairstowi G.B. Sowerby III., 1889

Conservation status
- Least Concern (IUCN 3.1)

Scientific classification
- Kingdom: Animalia
- Phylum: Mollusca
- Class: Gastropoda
- Subclass: Caenogastropoda
- Order: Neogastropoda
- Superfamily: Conoidea
- Family: Conidae
- Genus: Conus
- Species: C. bairstowi

Binomial name
- Conus bairstowi G. B. Sowerby III, 1889

Synonyms
- Conus (Sciteconus) bairstowi G. B. Sowerby III, 1889 accepted, alternate representation; Sciteconus bairstowi (G. B. Sowerby III, 1889)

= Conus bairstowi =

Species of sea snail

Conus bairstowi, common name Bairstow's cone, is a species of sea snail, a marine gastropod mollusc in the family Conidae, the cone snails and their allies.

Like all species within the genus Conus, these snails are predatory and venomous. They are capable of stinging humans, therefore live ones should be handled carefully or not at all.

== Description ==
The size of the shell varies between 28 mm and 53 mm.

== Distribution ==
This marine species occurs off Algoa Bay, Southern Transkei, South Africa.
