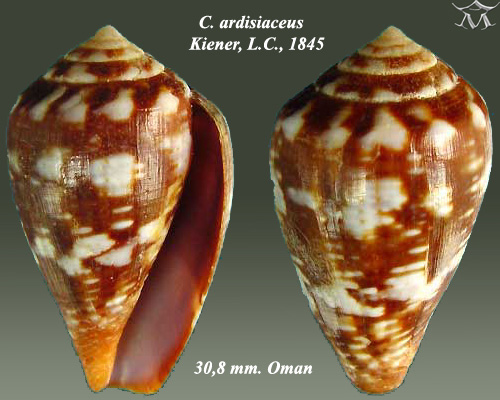
- Apertural and abapertural views of shell of Conus ardisiaceus Kiener, L.C., 1845
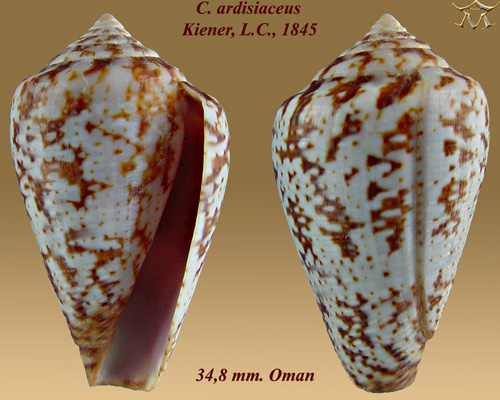

Conservation status
- Vulnerable (IUCN 3.1)

Scientific classification
- Kingdom: Animalia
- Phylum: Mollusca
- Class: Gastropoda
- Subclass: Caenogastropoda
- Order: Neogastropoda
- Superfamily: Conoidea
- Family: Conidae
- Genus: Conus
- Species: C. ardisiaceus

Binomial name
- Conus ardisiaceus Kiener, 1845

Synonyms
- Conus (Floraconus) ardisiaceus Kiener, 1850 · accepted, alternate representation; Ketyconus ardisiaceus (Kiener, 1850); Rhizoconus ardisiaceus (Kiener, 1850)

= Conus ardisiaceus =

Species of sea snail

Conus ardisiaceus is a species of sea snail, a marine gastropod mollusk in the family Conidae, the cone snails and their allies.

Like all species within the genus Conus, these snails are predatory and venomous. They are capable of stinging humans, therefore live ones should be handled carefully or not at all.

== Description ==
The size of the shell varies between 24 mm and 55 mm.

== Distribution ==
This marine species occurs off Muscat and Oman.
