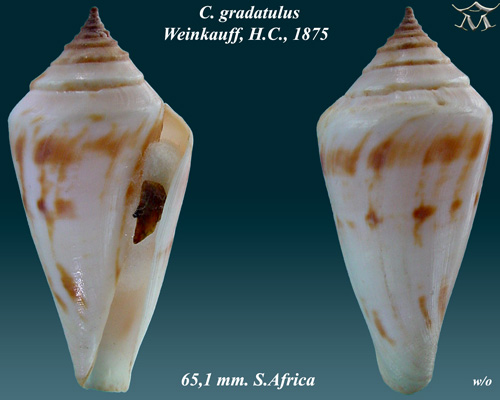
- Apertural and abapertural views of shell of Conus gradatulus Weinkauff, H.C., 1875

Scientific classification
- Kingdom: Animalia
- Phylum: Mollusca
- Class: Gastropoda
- Subclass: Caenogastropoda
- Order: Neogastropoda
- Superfamily: Conoidea
- Family: Conidae
- Genus: Conus
- Species: C. gradatulus

Binomial name
- Conus gradatulus Weinkauff, 1875

Synonyms
- Conus (Sciteconus) gradatulus Weinkauff, 1875 · accepted, alternate representation; Conus oltmansianus van Lennep, 1876; Conus papillaris A. Adams & Reeve, 1848 (invalid: junior homonym of Conus papillaris G.B. Sowerby I, 1833); Conus papillaris Reeve, 1849 (invalid: junior homonym of Conus papillaris G.B. Sowerby I, 1833); Conus patens G. B. Sowerby III, 1903; Conus turritus G. B. Sowerby II, 1870 (invalid: junior homonym of Conus turritus Lamarck, 1803; Conus oltmansianus is a replacement name); Leptoconus gradatulus (Weinkauff, 1875); Leptoconus patens (G. B. Sowerby III, 1903); Sciteconus gradatulus (Weinkauff, 1875); Sciteconus patens (G. B. Sowerby III, 1903) ·

= Conus gradatulus =

Species of sea snail

Conus gradatulus, common name the Agulhas cone shell, is a species of sea snail, a marine gastropod mollusk in the family Conidae, the cone snails and their allies.

Like all species within the genus Conus, these snails are predatory and venomous. They are capable of stinging humans, therefore live ones should be handled carefully or not at all.

== Description ==
The size of the shell varies between 41 mm and 72 mm. The spire is elevated, gradate, with channeled whorls. The body whorl is roseate with three series of longitudinal maculations of chestnut-color, forming interrupted bands. The aperture is rosy.

== Distinguishing features ==
The length of the shell attains 80 mm.

The shell is light in weight, with a body whorl that is weakly convex and angular at the shoulder. The spire is broadly tapering to a sharp tip, though spire height may vary, and has a stepped profile due to the angular shoulder. Whorls are concave above the shoulder and nearly smooth. The base of the body whorl has faint spiral threads, while the rest of the surface is marked only by subtle growth lines. The aperture is elongated and narrow, with a thin outer lip. The operculum is very small and oblong-ovate.

The shell's ground color is white, variably marked with orange-brown or reddish-brown, often forming a broad spiral band below the shoulder that commonly breaks into wavy axial stripes, sometimes nearly covering the entire body whorl. The shoulder slope and spire are white, occasionally accented with orange-brown axial flames. Living specimens have a thin, translucent olive-yellow periostracum that partially obscures the underlying color pattern. Specimens from the West Coast, typically form patens, are generally uniformly whitish, lacking color patterns, and often have a chalky appearance.

== Distribution ==
This marine species occurs off From Namibia (Walvis Bay) and West Coast to the Agulhas Bank, South Africa, at depths between 30 m and 500 m.

== Gallery ==
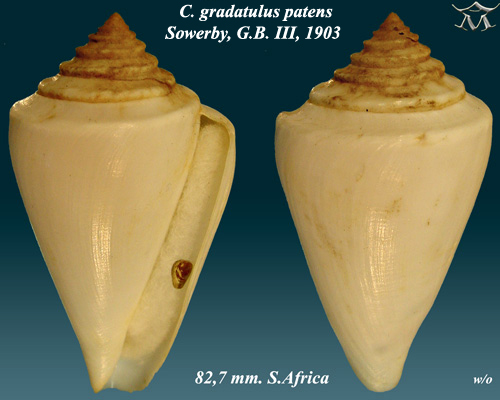
Conus gradatulus patens Sowerby, G.B. III, 1903

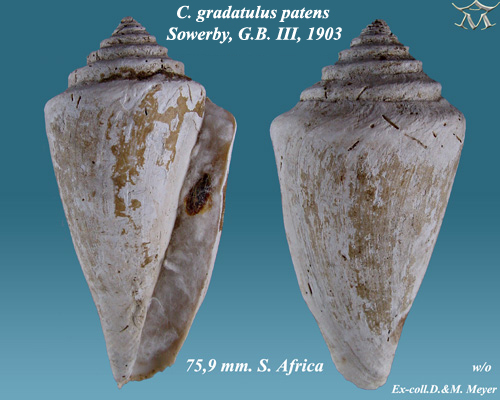
Conus gradatulus patens Sowerby, G.B. III, 1903
