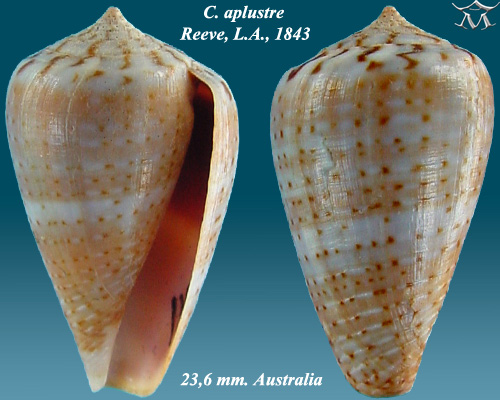
- Apertural and abapertural views of shell of Conus aplustre Reeve, L.A., 1843
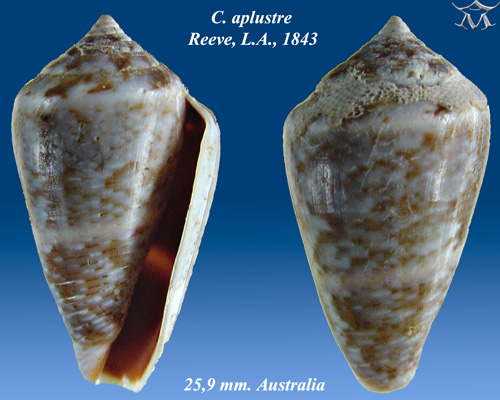

Conservation status
- Least Concern (IUCN 3.1)

Scientific classification
- Kingdom: Animalia
- Phylum: Mollusca
- Class: Gastropoda
- Subclass: Caenogastropoda
- Order: Neogastropoda
- Superfamily: Conoidea
- Family: Conidae
- Genus: Conus
- Species: C. aplustre

Binomial name
- Conus aplustre Reeve, 1843

Synonyms
- Conus (Floraconus) aplustre Reeve, 1843 · accepted, alternate representation; Conus cooki Brazier, 1870; Conus neglectus A. Adams, 1855; Floraconus aplustre (Reeve, 1843)

= Conus aplustre =

Species of sea snail

Conus aplustre, common name the black-end cone, is a species of sea snail, a marine gastropod mollusk in the family Conidae, the cone snails and their allies.

Like all species within the genus Conus, these snails are predatory and venomous. They are capable of stinging humans, therefore live ones should be handled carefully or not at all.

== Description ==
The size of the shell varies between 19 mm and 27 mm. The shell is rather stoutly turbinated, smooth, thin, somewhat inflated, and striate towards the base. Its color is yellowish white, with irregular yellowish brown or ash faint bands, and lines of white and chestnut articulations. The spire is depressed. The apex is pointed.

== Distribution ==
This marine species is endemic to Australia and occurs off New South Wales and Queensland.
