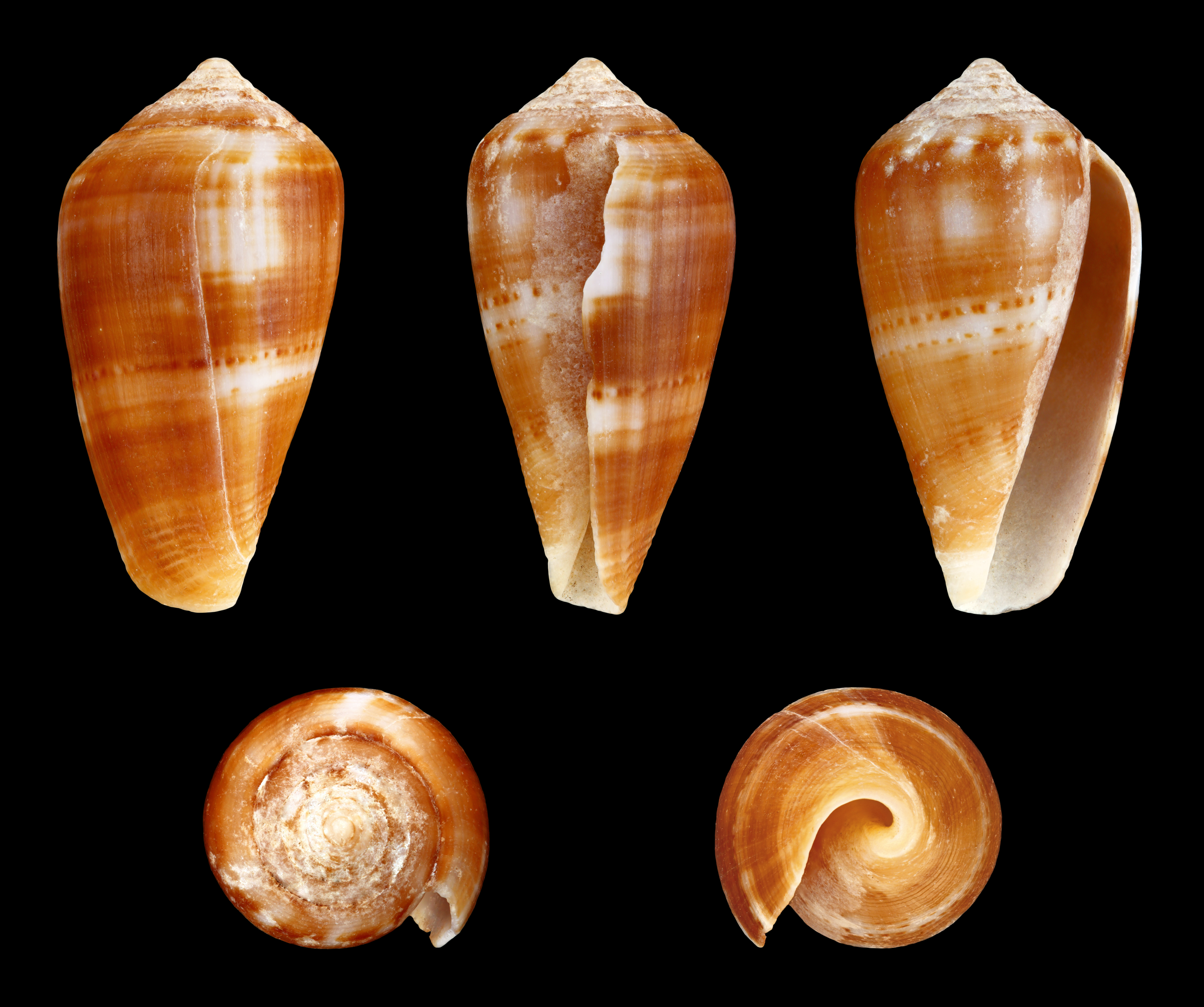
- A shell of Conus tinianus from Cape Agulhas, South Africa

Scientific classification
- Kingdom: Animalia
- Phylum: Mollusca
- Class: Gastropoda
- Subclass: Caenogastropoda
- Order: Neogastropoda
- Superfamily: Conoidea
- Family: Conidae
- Genus: Conus
- Species: C. tinianus

Binomial name
- Conus tinianus Hwass in Bruguière, 1792

Synonyms
- Conus (Floraconus) tinianus Hwass in Bruguière, 1792 · accepted, alternate representation; Conus alfredensis Bartsch, 1915; Conus aurora Lamarck, 1810; Conus fulvus G. B. Sowerby III, 1889; Conus kieneri Crosse, 1858 (nomen dubium); Conus kraussi Turton, 1932; Conus lavendulus Bartsch, 1915 (color form); Conus lavendulus approximata Turton, 1932; Conus loveni Krauss, 1848; Conus rosaceus Dillwyn, 1817; Conus secutor Crosse, 1865; Conus tenuis G. B. Sowerby II, 1833; Floraconus tinianus Hwass in Bruguière, 1792; Ketyconus tinianus (Hwass in Bruguière, 1792)

= Conus tinianus =

Species of sea snail

Conus tinianus, common name the variable cone, is a species of sea snail, a marine gastropod mollusk in the family Conidae, the cone snails and their allies.

Like all species within the genus Conus, these snails are predatory and venomous. They are capable of stinging humans, therefore live ones should be handled carefully or not at all.

== Description ==
The size of the shell varies between 20 mm and 60 mm. The thin shell is striated towards the base. Its color is reddish chestnut clouded with gray, and irregularly ornamented with indistinct fillets of articulated white and chestnut. The spire is obtusely convex. The apex is rose-tinted.

== Distribution ==
This marine species occurs off the east coast of South Africa.

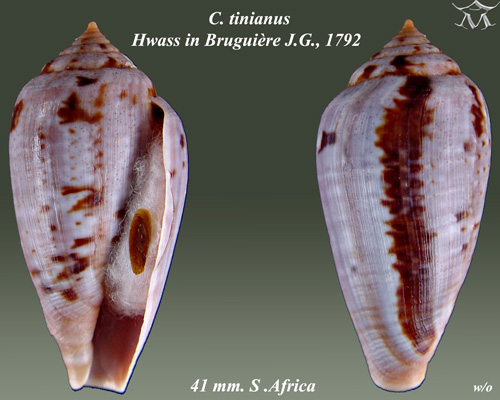
Conus tinianus Hwass in Bruguière, J.G., 1792

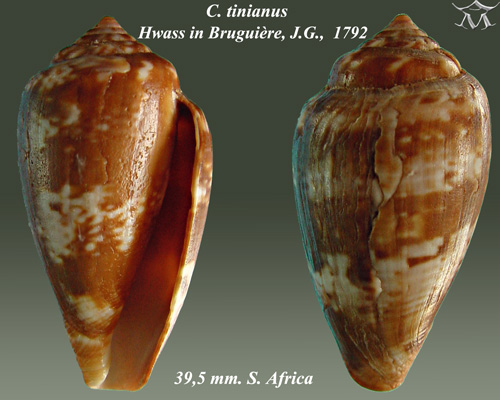
Conus tinianus Hwass in Bruguière, J.G., 1792

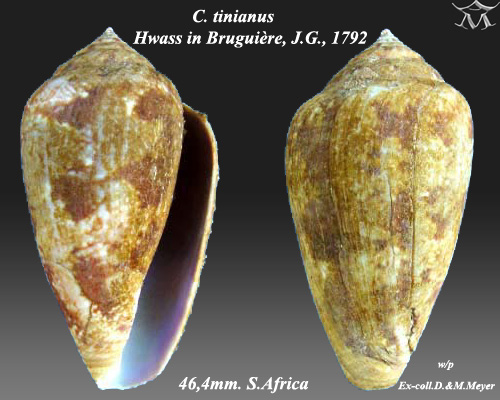
Conus tinianus Hwass in Bruguière, J.G., 1792
