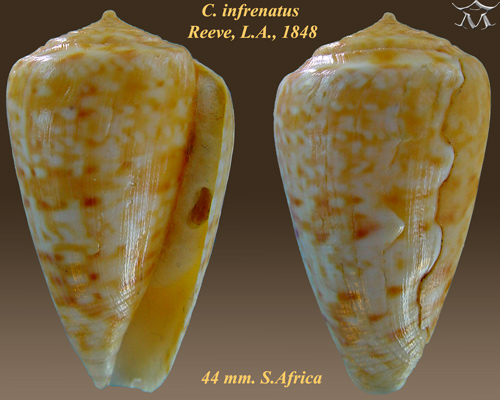
- Apertural and abapertural views of shell of Conus infrenatus Reeve, L.A., 1848
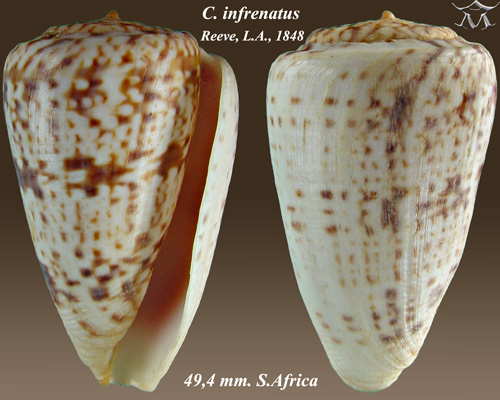

Conservation status
- Least Concern (IUCN 3.1)

Scientific classification
- Kingdom: Animalia
- Phylum: Mollusca
- Class: Gastropoda
- Subclass: Caenogastropoda
- Order: Neogastropoda
- Superfamily: Conoidea
- Family: Conidae
- Genus: Conus
- Species: C. infrenatus

Binomial name
- Conus infrenatus Reeve, 1848

Synonyms
- Conus (Sciteconus) infrenatus Reeve, 1848 · accepted, alternate representation; Chelyconus succinctus Adams, A. in Adams, H.G. & A. Adams, 1853; Conus succinctus A. Adams, 1855; Sciteconus infrenatus (Reeve, 1848)

= Conus infrenatus =

Species of sea snail

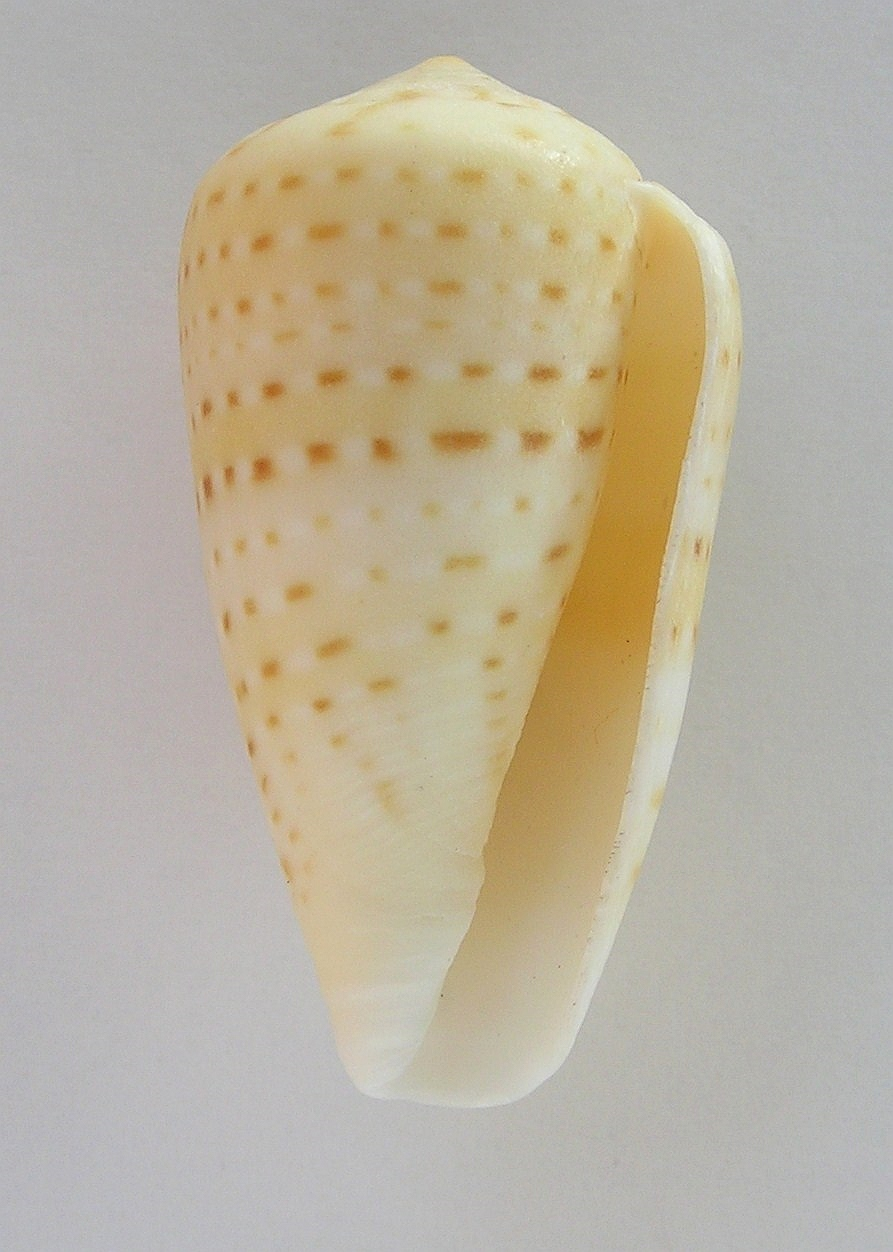
Apertural view of Conus infrenatus

Conus infrenatus, common name the Jeffrey's Bay cone, is a species of sea snail, a marine gastropod mollusk in the family Conidae, the cone snails and their allies.

Like all species within the genus Conus, these snails are predatory and venomous. They are capable of stinging humans, therefore live ones should be handled carefully or not at all.

== Description ==
The size of an adult shell varies between 24 mm and 50 mm. The shell is rosy white, encircled by articulated lines of chestnut and white spots. The apex is pink.

== Distribution ==
This marine species occurs off Transkei and KwaZuluNatal, South Africa.
