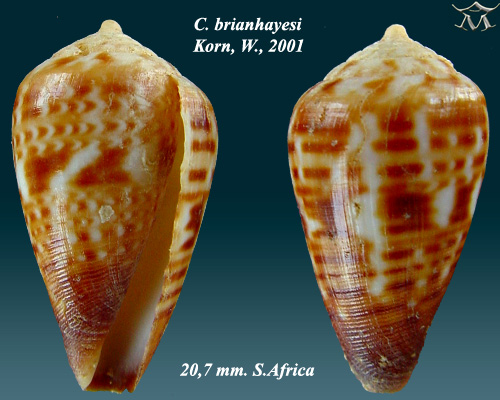
- Apertural and abapertural views of shell of Conus brianhayesi Korn, W., 2001

Conservation status
- Least Concern (IUCN 3.1)

Scientific classification
- Kingdom: Animalia
- Phylum: Mollusca
- Class: Gastropoda
- Subclass: Caenogastropoda
- Order: Neogastropoda
- Superfamily: Conoidea
- Family: Conidae
- Genus: Conus
- Species: C. brianhayesi

Binomial name
- Conus brianhayesi Korn, 2002

Synonyms
- Conus (Sciteconus) brianhayesi Korn, 2001 accepted, alternate representation; Conus hayesi Korn, 2001 (Invalid: junior homonym of Conus hayesi Arnold, 1909; Conus brianhayesi is a replacement name); Sciteconus brianhayesi (Korn, 2001)

= Conus brianhayesi =

Species of sea snail

Conus brianhayesi is a species of sea snail, a marine gastropod mollusk in the family Conidae, the cone snails and their allies.

Like all species within the genus Conus, these snails are predatory and venomous. They are capable of stinging humans, therefore live ones should be handled carefully or not at all.

== Description ==
The size of the shell varies between 17 mm and 25 mm.

== Distribution ==
This marine species occurs off North Transkei, South Africa.
