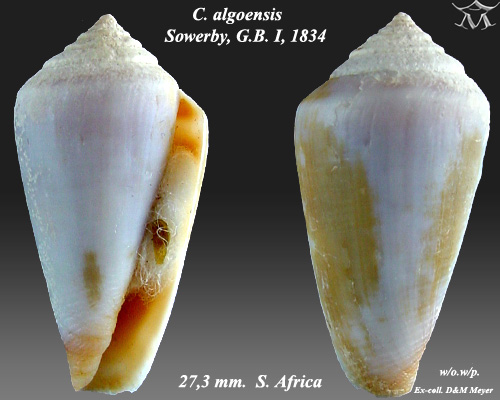
- Apertural and abapertural views of shell of Conus algoensis Sowerby, G.B. I, 1834
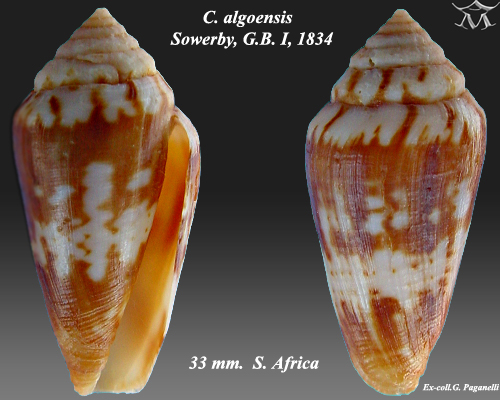

Conservation status
- Least Concern (IUCN 3.1)

Scientific classification
- Kingdom: Animalia
- Phylum: Mollusca
- Class: Gastropoda
- Subclass: Caenogastropoda
- Order: Neogastropoda
- Superfamily: Conoidea
- Family: Conidae
- Genus: Conus
- Species: C. algoensis

Binomial name
- Conus algoensis G. B. Sowerby I, 1834

Synonyms
- Conus (Sciteconus) algoensis G. B. Sowerby I, 1834 · accepted, alternate representation; Conus algoensis agulhasi Coomans, Moolenbeek & Wils, 1980; Conus danieli Crosse, 1858; Conus jaspideus Kiener, 1845 (invalid: junior homonym of Conus jaspideus Gmelin, 1791); Conus scitulus Reeve, 1849; Sciteconus algoensis (G. B. Sowerby I, 1834)

= Conus algoensis =

Species of sea snail

Conus algoensis, common name the algoa cone, is a species of sea snail, a marine gastropod mollusk in the family Conidae, the cone snails and their allies.

Like all species within the genus Conus, these snails are predatory and venomous. They are capable of stinging humans, therefore live ones should be handled carefully or not at all.

There are four subspecies :

- Conus algoensis algoensis Sowerby, G.B. I, 1834 (synonym: Conus algoensis agulhasi Coomans, Moolenbeek & Wils, 1980)
- Conus algoensis norpothi Lorenz, 2015 (alternate representation: Conus (Sciteconus) algoensis norpothi Lorenz, 2015)
- Conus algoensis scitulus Reeve, 1849 (synonym: Conus scitulus Reeve, 1849)
- Conus algoensis simplex Sowerby, G.B. II, 1857 (synonym: Conus simplex G. B. Sowerby II, 1858 )

== Description ==
The size of the shell varies between 12 mm and 60 mm. The thin shell is smooth,. It has a chestnut-brown color, with one or two bands of longitudinal white markings. The spire is articulated with white and brown.

== Distribution ==
This marine species occurs off the south coast of South Africa.

== Gallery ==
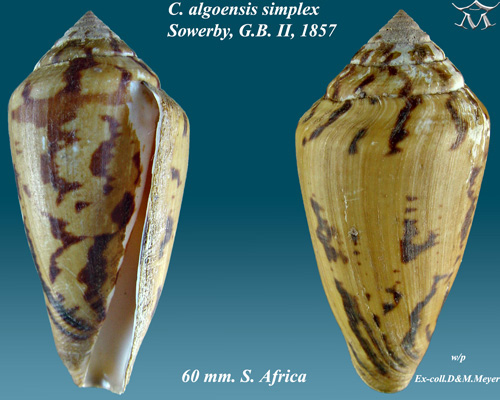
Conus algoensis simplex Sowerby, G.B. II, 1857

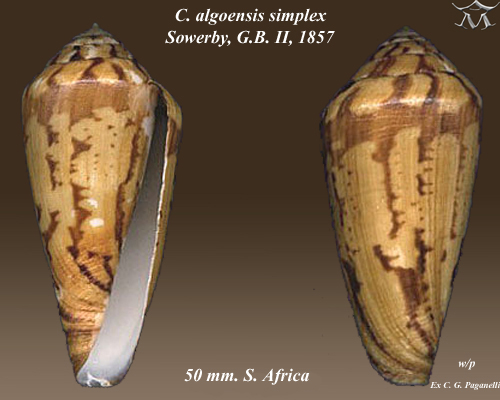
Conus algoensis simplex Sowerby, G.B. II, 1857

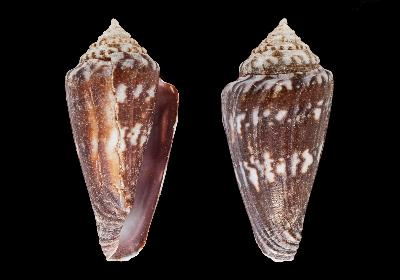
Conus algoensis norpothi Lorenz 2015
