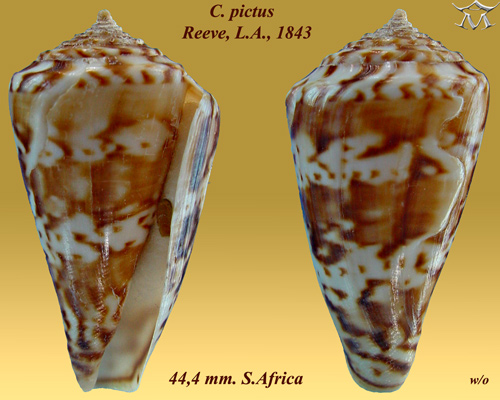
- Apertural and abapertural views of shell of Conus pictus Reeve, L.A., 1843

Scientific classification
- Kingdom: Animalia
- Phylum: Mollusca
- Class: Gastropoda
- Subclass: Caenogastropoda
- Order: Neogastropoda
- Superfamily: Conoidea
- Family: Conidae
- Genus: Conus
- Species: C. pictus

Binomial name
- Conus pictus Reeve, 1843

Synonyms
- Conus (Sciteconus) pictus Reeve, 1843 · accepted, alternate representation; Conus beckeri G. B. Sowerby III, 1911; Sciteconus pictus (Reeve, 1843)

= Conus pictus =

Species of sea snail

Conus pictus is a species of sea snail, a marine gastropod mollusk in the family Conidae, the cone snails and their allies.

Like all species within the genus Conus, these snails are predatory and venomous. They are capable of stinging humans, therefore live ones should be handled carefully or not at all.

Subspecies

- Conus pictus pictus Reeve, 1843
- Conus pictus transkeiensis Korn, W. 1998 (synonym: Sciteconus pictus transkeiensis Korn, 1998)

== Description ==
The size of the shell varies between 26 mm and 50 mm. The shell is chestnut-colored, with two or three pink bands, and a few narrow lines, ornamented with reddish or chestnut spots. The spire is maculated.

== Distribution ==
This marine species occurs off Jeffrey's Bay - East London, Republic South Africa

== Gallery ==
Conus pictus transkeiensis

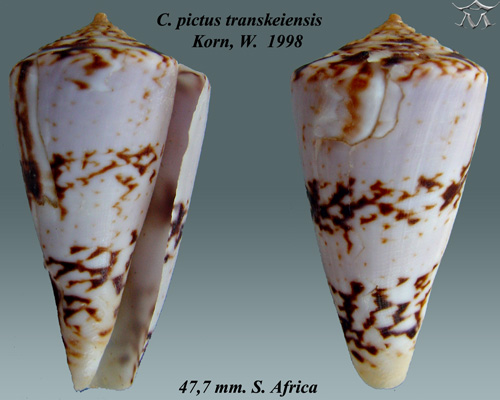
Conus pictus transkeiensis Korn, W. 1998

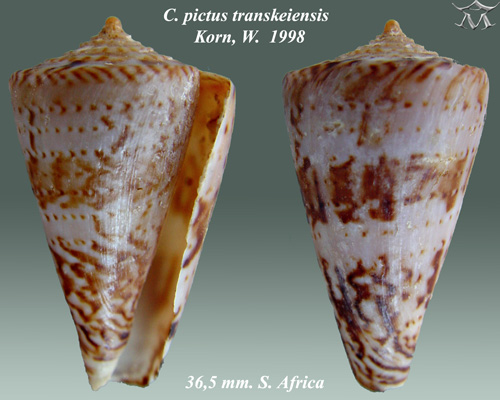
Conus pictus transkeiensis Korn, W. 1998
