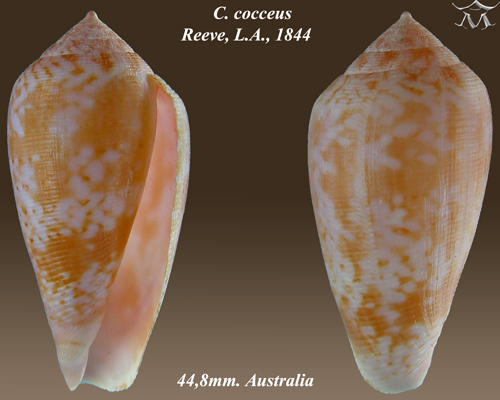
- Apertural and abapertural views of shell of Conus cocceus Reeve, L.A., 1844
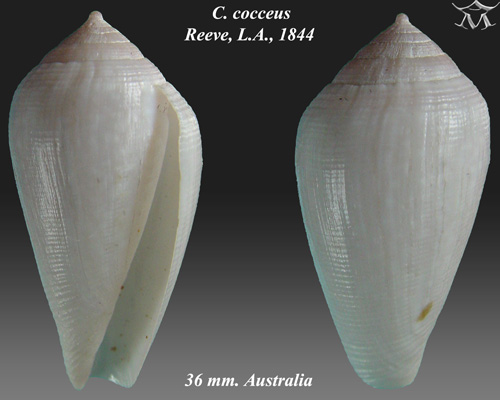

Conservation status
- Least Concern (IUCN 3.1)

Scientific classification
- Kingdom: Animalia
- Phylum: Mollusca
- Class: Gastropoda
- Subclass: Caenogastropoda
- Order: Neogastropoda
- Superfamily: Conoidea
- Family: Conidae
- Genus: Conus
- Species: C. cocceus

Binomial name
- Conus cocceus Reeve, 1843

Synonyms
- Conus (Floraconus) cocceus Reeve, 1844 · accepted, alternate representation; Conus citrinus Kiener, 1845 (invalid: junior homonym of Conus citrinus Gmelin, 1791); Conus decrepitus Kiener, 1845; Conus kieneri Crosse, 1858; Floraconus cocceus (Reeve, 1844)

= Conus cocceus =

Species of sea snail

Conus cocceus, common name the cocceus cone or the scarlet-spotted cone, is a species of sea snail, a marine gastropod mollusk in the family Conidae, the cone snails and their allies.

Like all species within the genus Conus, these snails are predatory and venomous. They are capable of stinging humans, therefore live ones should be handled carefully or not at all.

== Description ==
The size of the shell varies between 42 mm and 54 mm. The shell is turbinated, rather stout towards the upper part, a little rounded, transversely very finely ridged. The interstices between the ridges are slightly pricked. Its color is white delicately filleted with small irregular pale scarlet spots. The spire is obtusely convex.

== Distribution ==
This marine species is endemic to Australia (Western Australia)
