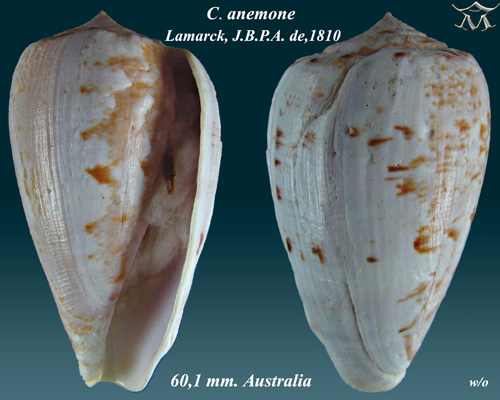
- Apertural and abapertural views of shell of Conus anemone Lamarck, J.B.P.A. de, 1810
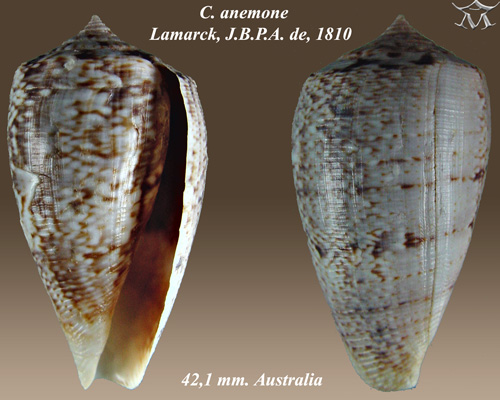

Conservation status
- Least Concern (IUCN 3.1)

Scientific classification
- Kingdom: Animalia
- Phylum: Mollusca
- Class: Gastropoda
- Subclass: Caenogastropoda
- Order: Neogastropoda
- Superfamily: Conoidea
- Family: Conidae
- Genus: Conus
- Species: C. anemone

Binomial name
- Conus anemone Lamarck, 1810

Synonyms
- Conus (Floraconus) anemone Lamarck, 1810 accepted, alternate representation; Conus anemone anemone Lamarck, 1810; Conus carmeli Tenison-Woods, 1877; Conus flindersi Brazier, 1898; Conus incinctus Fenaux, 1942; Conus maculatus G. B. Sowerby II, 1858; Conus maculosus G. B. Sowerby II, 1833; Conus maculosus var. pallescens G. B. Sowerby I, 1833; Conus nitidissimus Fenaux, 1942; Conus remo Brazier, 1898; Conus roseotinctus G. B. Sowerby II, 1866; Conus superstriatus G. B. Sowerby II, 1858; Floraconus anemone (Lamarck, 1810); Floraconus anemone anemone (Lamarck, 1810); Floraconus peronianus Iredale, 1931; Floraconus saundersi Cotton, 1945; Floraconus singletoni Cotton, 1945; Magelliconus flindersi Brazier, J., 1898, "1897"

= Conus anemone =

Species of sea snail

Conus anemone, common name the anemone cone, is a species of sea snail, a marine gastropod mollusk in the family Conidae, the cone snails and their allies.

Like all species within the genus Conus, these snails are predatory and venomous. They are capable of stinging humans, therefore live ones should be handled carefully or not at all.

Conus anemone is a variable species or a species complex, as reflected by the large number of nominal species that have been established. In particular, C. peronianus, a very large form occurring from Port Lincoln, South Australia, to Cape Naturaliste, requires further taxonomic examination.

== Subspecies ==
- Conus anemone anemone Lamarck, 1810 represented as Conus anemone Lamarck, 1810 (alternate representation)
- Conus anemone compressus G. B. Sowerby II, 1866: synonym of Conus compressus G. B. Sowerby II, 1866
- Conus anemone novaehollandiae A. Adams, 1855 (synonym: Floraconus novaehollandiae(A. Adams, 1855) )
  - According to the World Register of Marine Species (WoRMS) database, the status of Conus anemone novaehollandiae is in dispute. WoRMS regards it as a subspecies of C. anemone. However, there are morphological and habitat differences between the two, and there is a 600-kilometer distribution gap between the northernmost anemone populations and the southernmost novaehollandiae populations. Australian specialists treat the two as distinct species.

== Description ==
The size of the shell varies between 21 mm and 93 mm. The shell is very variable in form. It is short and robust, with a short spire, or longer and more slender, with an elevated spire. The spire and the body whorl are closely encircled throughout with close ridged striae. The color of the shell is white, longitudinally nebulously or reticulately painted with chestnut or chocolate, with an irregular central white band. The color of the aperture is chocolate-tinged and white-banded in the middle.

== Distribution ==
This species is endemic to Australia and occurs off New South Wales, South Australia, Tasmania, Victoria and Western Australia

== See also ==
- List of marine animals of Australia (temperate waters)
