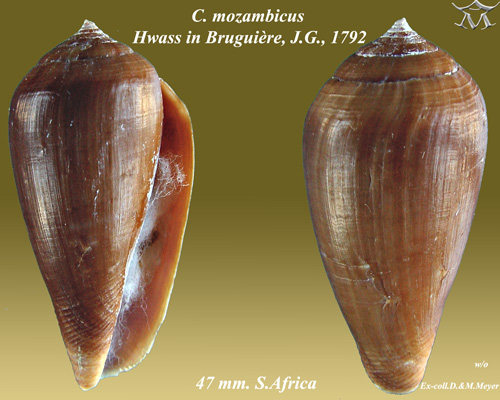
- Apertural and abapertural views of shell of Conus mozambicus Hwass in Bruguière, J.G., 1792
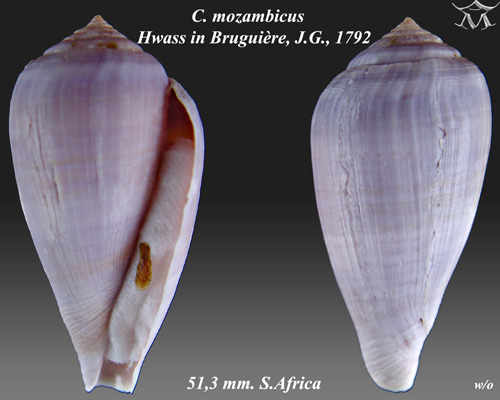

Scientific classification
- Kingdom: Animalia
- Phylum: Mollusca
- Class: Gastropoda
- Subclass: Caenogastropoda
- Order: Neogastropoda
- Superfamily: Conoidea
- Family: Conidae
- Genus: Conus
- Species: C. mozambicus

Binomial name
- Conus mozambicus Hwass in Bruguière, 1792

Synonyms
- Conus (Floraconus) mozambicus Hwass in Bruguière, 1792 · accepted, alternate representation; Conus altispiratus G. B. Sowerby II, 1873; Conus caffer Krauss, 1848 (invalid: junior homonym of Conus caffer Röding, 1798); Conus informis Hwass in Bruguière, 1792; Conus lautus Reeve, 1844; Conus macei Crosse, 1865; Conus mozambicus lautus Reeve, 1844; Conus mozambicus mozambicus Hwass, 1792; Sciteconus mozambicus (Hwass in Bruguière, 1792)

= Conus mozambicus =

Species of sea snail

Conus mozambicus, common name the Mozambique cone or the elongate cone, is a species of medium-sized sea snail, a predatory marine gastropod mollusc in the family Conidae, the cone snails or cone shells.

== Distribution ==
Conus mozambicus cone is known off the southern African coast from Lüderitz Bay to Mossel Bay, subtidally in shallow water. The species is endemic to this region. It is also found off Senegal and Mozambique.

== Description ==
Conus mozambicus has a medium-sized shell which may grow to 65mm in total length. It has a sharply pointed spire. The shell colour is dull and mottled with brown, and there may be darker blotches at the shoulder. The spire of the shell is stepped.

== Ecology ==
Conus mozambicus feeds on polychaete worms. The egg capsules are vase-shaped and contain 19-23 eggs.
