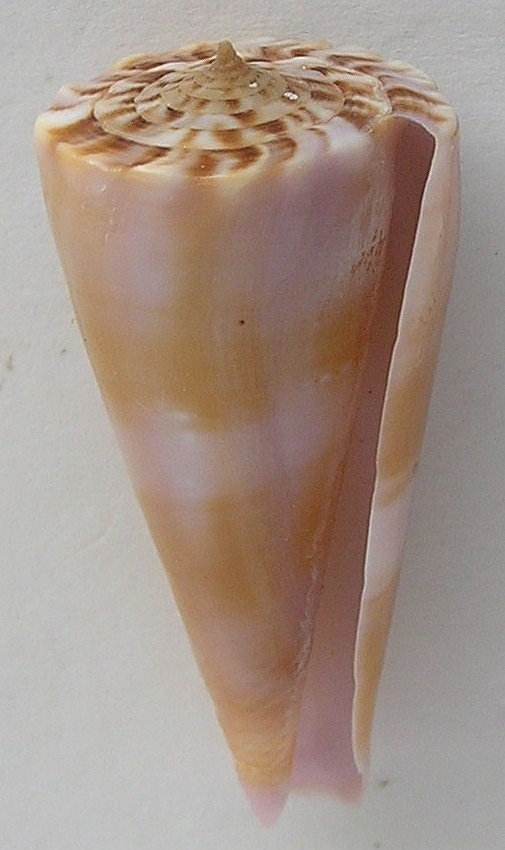
- Apertural view of shell Conus gloriakiiensis (Kuroda & Itô, 1961)

Scientific classification
- Kingdom: Animalia
- Phylum: Mollusca
- Class: Gastropoda
- (unranked): clade Caenogastropoda clade Hypsogastropoda clade Neogastropoda
- Superfamily: Conoidea
- Family: Conidae
- Genus: Kioconus da Motta, 1991

Synonyms
- Conus (Splinoconus) da Motta, 1991

= Kioconus =

Subgenus of molluscs

Kioconus is a synonym of the subgenus Conus (Splinoconus) da Motta, 1991 represented as Conus Linnaeus, 1758. These are sea snails, marine gastropod mollusks in the family Conidae, the cone snails and their allies.

== Distinguishing characteristics ==
The Tucker & Tenorio 2009 taxonomy distinguishes Kioconus from Conus in the following ways:

- Genus Conus sensu stricto Linnaeus, 1758

Shell characters (living and fossil species)

The basic shell shape is conical to elongated conical, has a deep anal notch on the shoulder, a smooth periostracum and a small operculum. The shoulder of the shell is usually nodulose and the protoconch is usually multispiral. Markings often include the presence of tents except for black or white color variants, with the absence of spiral lines of minute tents and textile bars.

Radular tooth (not known for fossil species)

The radula has an elongated anterior section with serrations and a large exposed terminating cusp, a non-obvious waist, blade is either small or absent and has a short barb, and lacks a basal spur.

Geographical distribution

These species are found in the Indo-Pacific region.

Feeding habits

These species eat other gastropods including cones.

- the former genus Kioconus da Motta, 1991

Shell characters (living and fossil species)

The shell is obconic with flat sides and carinate shoulders. The spire is only slightly scalariform. The protoconch is multispiral. The shell is ornamented with well developed cords on the whorl tops, and nodules which may persist or die out early. The anal notch is moderate to deep. The periostracum is tufted and ridged, and the operculum is moderate in size.

Radular tooth (not known for fossil species)

The anterior section of the radular tooth is roughly equal in length with the posterior section, and the blade covers between one-third to more than half the length of the anterior section. A basal spur is present, the barb is short, and the denticles are coarse.

Geographical distribution

The species in this genus occur in the Indo-Pacific region including Australia and South Africa.

Feeding habits

These cone snails are vermivorous, meaning that the cones prey on polychaete worms.

== Species list ==
This list of species is based on the information in the World Register of Marine Species (WoRMS) list. Species within the genus Kioconus include:

- Kioconus alconnelli (da Motta, 1986): synonym of Conus alconnelli da Motta, 1986
- Kioconus caillaudii (Kiener, 1845): synonym of Conus caillaudii Kiener, 1845
- Kioconus capreolus (Röckel, 1985): synonym of Conus capreolus Röckel, 1985
- Kioconus dayriti (Röckel & da Motta, 1983): synonym of Conus dayriti Röckel & da Motta, 1983
- Kioconus estivali (Moolenbeek & Richard, 1995): synonym of Conus estivali Moolenbeek & Richard, 1995
- Kioconus gloriakiiensis (Kuroda & Itô, 1961): synonym of Conus gloriakiiensis Kuroda & Itô, 1961
- Kioconus gondwanensis (Röckel & Moolenbeek, 1995): synonym of Conus gondwanensis Röckel & Moolenbeek, 1995
- Kioconus hirasei (Kuroda, 1956): synonym of Conus hirasei (Kuroda, 1956)
- Kioconus lenavati (da Motta & Röckel, 1982): synonym of Conus lenavati da Motta & Röckel, 1982
- Kioconus martensi (E.A. Smith, 1884): synonym of Conus martensi E. A. Smith, 1884
- Kioconus nielsenae (Marsh, 1962): synonym of Conus nielsenae Marsh, 1962
- Kioconus papuensis (Coomans & Moolenbeek, 1982): synonym of Conus papuensis Coomans & Moolenbeek, 1982
- Kioconus plinthis (Richard & Moolenbeek, 1988): synonym of Conus plinthis Richard & Moolenbeek, 1988
- Kioconus queenslandis (da Motta, 1984): synonym of Conus queenslandis da Motta, 1984
- Kioconus recluzianus (Bernardi, 1853): synonym of Conus recluzianus Bernardi, 1853
- Kioconus reductaspiralis (Walls, 1979): synonym of Conus reductaspiralis Walls, 1979
- Kioconus roseorapum (G. Raybaudi & da Motta, 1990): synonym of Conus roseorapum G. Raybaudi & da Motta, 1990
- Kioconus sazanka (Shikama, 1970): synonym of Conus sazanka Shikama, 1970
- Kioconus shikamai (Coomans, Moolenbeek & Wils, 1985): synonym of Conus shikamai Coomans, Moolenbeek & Wils, 1985
- Kioconus sugimotonis (Kuroda, 1928): synonym of Conus sugimotonis Kuroda, 1928
- Kioconus thevenardensis (da Motta, 1987): synonym of Conus thevenardensis da Motta, 1987
- Kioconus tribblei (Walls, 1977): synonym of Conus tribblei Walls, 1977
- Kioconus typhon (Kilburn, 1975): synonym of Conus typhon Kilburn, 1975
- Kioconus voluminalis (Reeve, 1843): synonym of Conus voluminalis Reeve, 1843
