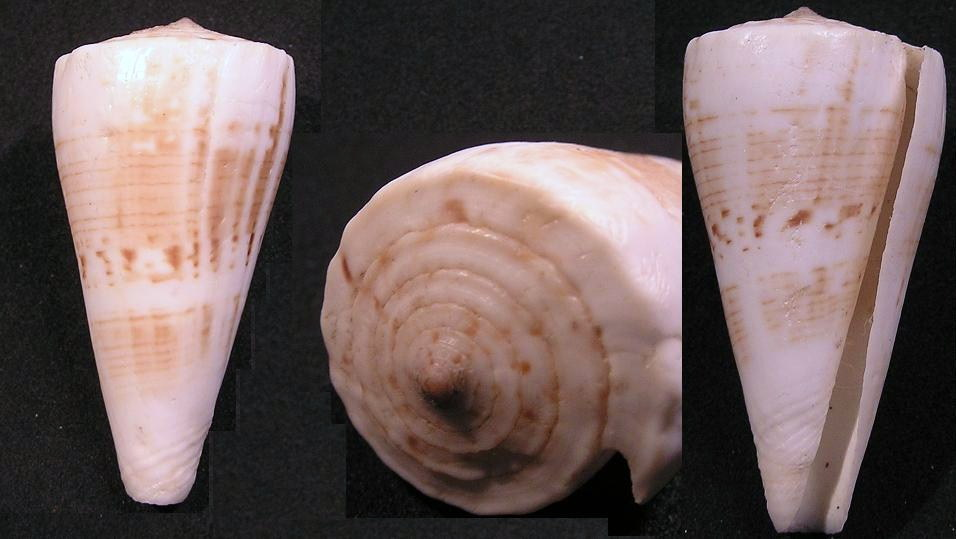
- Three views of a shell of Conus urashimanus

Scientific classification
- Kingdom: Animalia
- Phylum: Mollusca
- Class: Gastropoda
- Subclass: Caenogastropoda
- Order: Neogastropoda
- Superfamily: Conoidea
- Family: Conidae
- Genus: Conus
- Species: C. urashimanus

Binomial name
- Conus urashimanus Kuroda & Itô, 1961

Synonyms
- Conus (Splinoconus) urashimanus Kuroda & Itô, 1961 · accepted, alternate representation; Kioconus urashimanus (Kuroda & Itô, 1961); Kioconus recluzianus var. urashimanus Kuroda & Itô, 1961

= Conus urashimanus =

Species of sea snail

Conus urashimanus, common name the Urashima cone, is a species of sea snail, a marine gastropod mollusk in the family Conidae, the cone snails, cone shells or cones. The connection to Urashima Taro is not evident. These snails are predatory and venomous. They are capable of stinging humans.

== Description ==
The size of the shell varies between 35 mm and 80 mm.

This species is dioecious.

To reproduce, this species does not release gametes into the water. While maturing, this species does not go through a trocophore stage.

== Taxonomy ==
Conus urashimanus was originally described as Conus (Rhizoconus) urashimanus by Kuroda and Ko. Itô in 1961. It has subsequently been placed in the subgenus Splinoconus as Conus (Splinoconus) urashimanus and has also been classified in the genus Kioconus as Kioconus urashimanus. These alternative combinations are currently regarded as unaccepted synonyms, while Conus urashimanus is the accepted name.

== Distribution ==
This marine species occurs in the Philippines and Japan.
