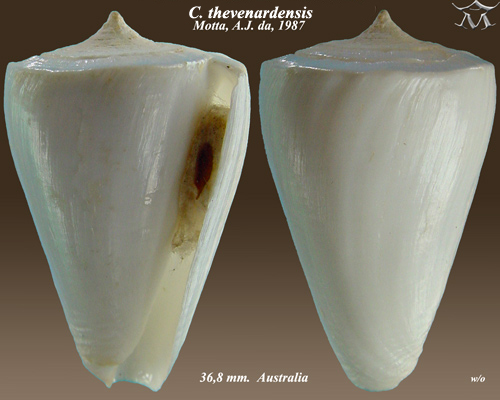
- Apertural and abapertural views of shell of Conus thevenardensis Motta, A.J. da, 1987
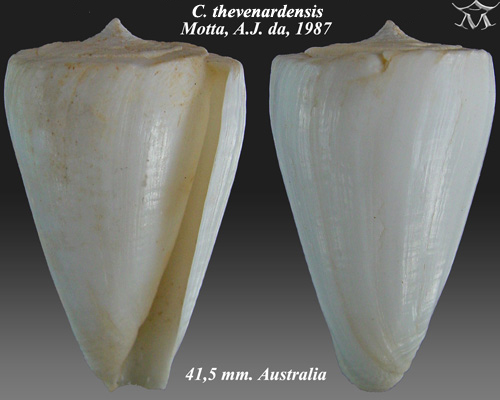

Scientific classification
- Kingdom: Animalia
- Phylum: Mollusca
- Class: Gastropoda
- Subclass: Caenogastropoda
- Order: Neogastropoda
- Superfamily: Conoidea
- Family: Conidae
- Genus: Conus
- Species: C. thevenardensis

Binomial name
- Conus thevenardensis da Motta, 1987

Synonyms
- Conus (Splinoconus) thevenardensis da Motta, 1987 · accepted, alternate representation; Conus nielsenae reductaspiralis Walls, 1979; Kioconus reductaspiralis thevenardensis da Motta, 1987

= Conus thevenardensis =

Species of sea snail

Conus thevenardensis is a species of sea snail, a marine gastropod mollusk in the family Conidae, the cone snails and their allies.

Like all species within the genus Conus, these snails are predatory and venomous. They are capable of stinging humans, therefore live ones should be handled carefully or not at all.

== Notes ==
Additional information regarding this species:

- Taxonomy: The status of Conus nielsenae, Conus reductaspiralis and Conus thevenardensis has been disputed by some authors, but Australian specialists generally regard them as distinct. For conservation evaluation, all three are here listed as distinct and as alternative representations in the genus Kioconus.

== Description ==
The size of the shell varies between 27 mm and 61 mm.

== Distribution ==
This marine species is endemic to Australia and occurs off Thevenard Island, Western Australia.
