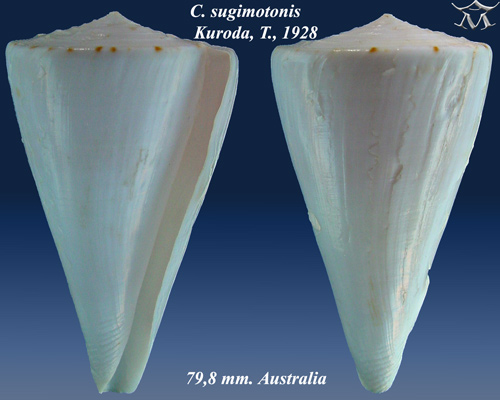
- Apertural and abapertural views of shell of Conus sugimotonis Kuroda, T., 1928

Scientific classification
- Kingdom: Animalia
- Phylum: Mollusca
- Class: Gastropoda
- Subclass: Caenogastropoda
- Order: Neogastropoda
- Superfamily: Conoidea
- Family: Conidae
- Genus: Conus
- Species: C. sugimotonis

Binomial name
- Conus sugimotonis Kuroda, 1928

Synonyms
- Conus (Klemaeconus) sugimotonis Kuroda, 1928 · accepted, alternate representation; Conus sugimotonis vicdani Lan, 1978; Conus whiteheadae da Motta, 1985; Kioconus sugimotonis (Kuroda, 1928)

= Conus sugimotonis =

Species of sea snail

Conus sugimotonis is a species of sea snail, a marine gastropod mollusk in the family Conidae, the cone snails and their allies.

Like all species within the genus Conus, these snails are predatory and venomous. They are capable of stinging humans, therefore live ones should be handled carefully or not at all.

== Description ==
The length of the shell varies between 50 mm and 114 mm.

== Distribution ==
This marine species occurs off Japan, Taiwan, the Philippines, in the Coral Sea and off Australia (Queensland).
