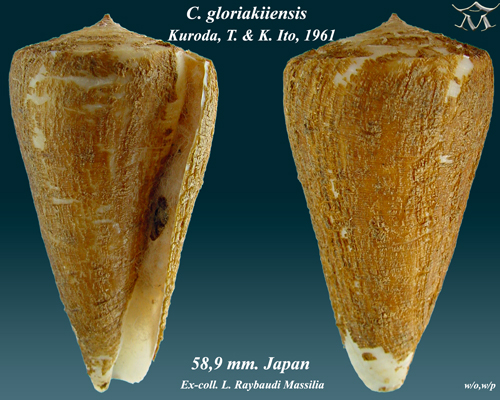
- Apertural and abapertural views of shell of Conus gloriakiiensis Kuroda, T. & K. Ito, 1961

Scientific classification
- Kingdom: Animalia
- Phylum: Mollusca
- Class: Gastropoda
- Subclass: Caenogastropoda
- Order: Neogastropoda
- Superfamily: Conoidea
- Family: Conidae
- Genus: Conus
- Species: C. gloriakiiensis

Binomial name
- Conus gloriakiiensis Kuroda & Itô, 1961

Synonyms
- Conus (Splinoconus) gloriakiiensis Kuroda & Itô, 1961 · accepted, alternate representation; Kioconus gloriakiiensis (Kuroda & Itô, 1961)

= Conus gloriakiiensis =

Species of sea snail

Conus gloriakiiensis is a species of sea snail, a marine gastropod mollusk in the family Conidae, the cone snails and their allies.

Like all species within the genus Conus, these snails are predatory and venomous. They are capable of stinging humans, therefore live ones should be handled carefully or not at all.

== Description ==
The size of an adult shell varies between 38 mm and 65.8 mm.

== Distribution ==
This species occurs in the Pacific Ocean from Japan to the Philippines.
