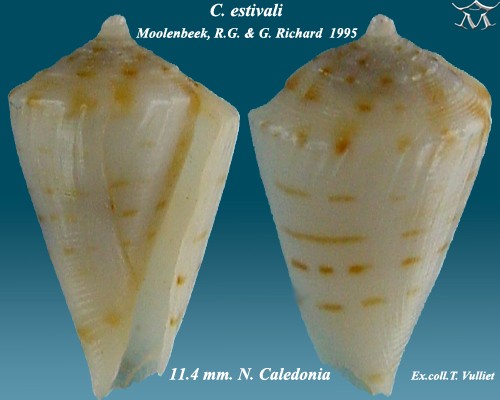
- Apertural and abapertural views of shell of Conus estivali Moolenbeek, R.G. & G. Richard 1995
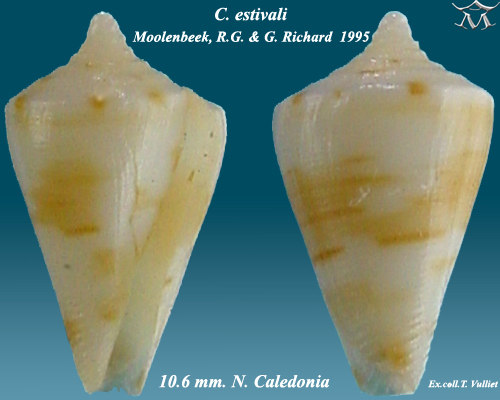

Conservation status
- Data Deficient (IUCN 3.1)

Scientific classification
- Kingdom: Animalia
- Phylum: Mollusca
- Class: Gastropoda
- Subclass: Caenogastropoda
- Order: Neogastropoda
- Superfamily: Conoidea
- Family: Conidae
- Genus: Conus
- Species: C. estivali

Binomial name
- Conus estivali Röckel, Richard, & Moolenbeek, 1995

Synonyms
- Continuconus estivali (Moolenbeek & Richard, 1995); Conus (Klemaeconus) estivali Moolenbeek & Richard, 1995 · accepted, alternate representation; Kioconus estivali (Moolenbeek & Richard, 1995)

= Conus estivali =

Species of sea snail

Conus estivali is a species of sea snail, a marine gastropod mollusk in the family Conidae, the cone snails and their allies.

Like all species within the genus Conus, these snails are predatory and venomous. They are capable of stinging humans, therefore live ones should be handled carefully or not at all.

== Description ==
The size of the shell attains 10 mm.

== Distribution ==
This marine species occurs in the Coral Sea and off New Caledonia.
