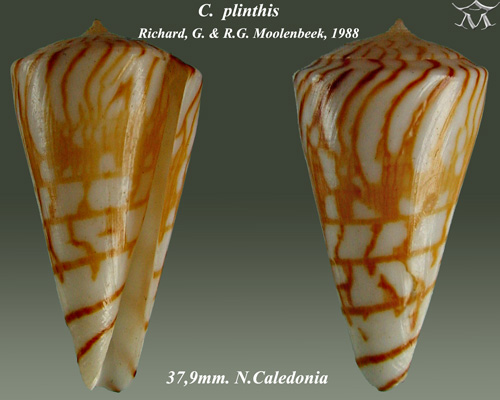
- Apertural and abapertural views of shell of Conus plinthis Richard, G. & R.G. Moolenbeek, 1988

Scientific classification
- Kingdom: Animalia
- Phylum: Mollusca
- Class: Gastropoda
- Subclass: Caenogastropoda
- Order: Neogastropoda
- Superfamily: Conoidea
- Family: Conidae
- Genus: Conus
- Species: C. plinthis

Binomial name
- Conus plinthis Richard & Moolenbeek, 1988

Synonyms
- Continuconus plinthis (Richard & Moolenbeek, 1988); Conus (Klemaeconus) plinthis Richard & Moolenbeek, 1988 · accepted, alternate representation; Kioconus plinthis (Richard & Moolenbeek, 1988)

= Conus plinthis =

Species of sea snail

Conus plinthis is a species of sea snail, a marine gastropod mollusk in the family Conidae, the cone snails and their allies.

Like all species within the genus Conus, these snails are predatory and venomous. They are capable of stinging humans, therefore live ones should be handled carefully or not at all.

== Description ==
The size of the shell varies between 16 mm and 61 mm.

== Distribution ==
This marine species occurs off New Caledonia and the Kermadec Islands.
