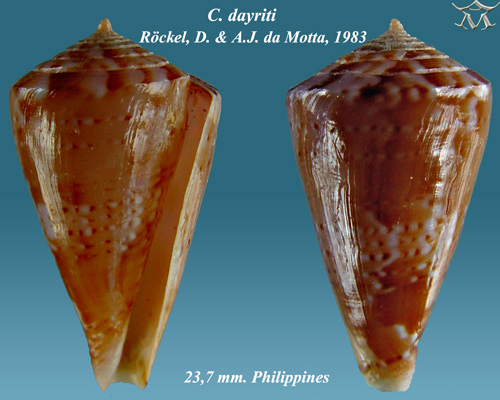
- Apertural and abapertural views of shell of Conus dayriti Röckel, D. & A.J. da Motta, 1983
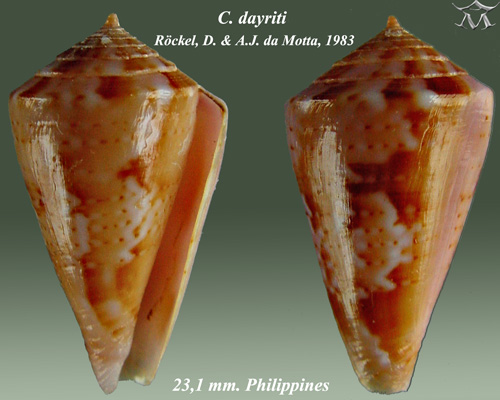

Conservation status
- Least Concern (IUCN 3.1)

Scientific classification
- Kingdom: Animalia
- Phylum: Mollusca
- Class: Gastropoda
- Subclass: Caenogastropoda
- Order: Neogastropoda
- Superfamily: Conoidea
- Family: Conidae
- Genus: Conus
- Species: C. dayriti

Binomial name
- Conus dayriti Röckel & da Motta, 1983

Synonyms
- Boucheticonus dayriti (Röckel & da Motta, 1983); Conus (Splinoconus) dayriti Röckel & da Motta, 1983 · accepted, alternate representation; Kioconus dayriti (Röckel & da Motta, 1983)

= Conus dayriti =

Species of sea snail

Conus dayriti is a species of sea snail, a marine gastropod mollusk in the family Conidae, the cone snails and their allies.

Like all species within the genus Conus, these snails are predatory and venomous. They are capable of stinging humans, therefore live ones should be handled carefully or not at all.

== Description ==
The size of the shell varies between 13 mm and 36 mm.

== Distribution ==
This marine species occurs off the Philippines and New Caledonia.

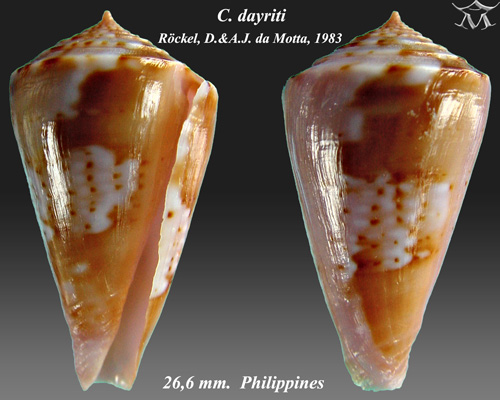
Conus dayriti Röckel, D. & A.J. da Motta, 1983
