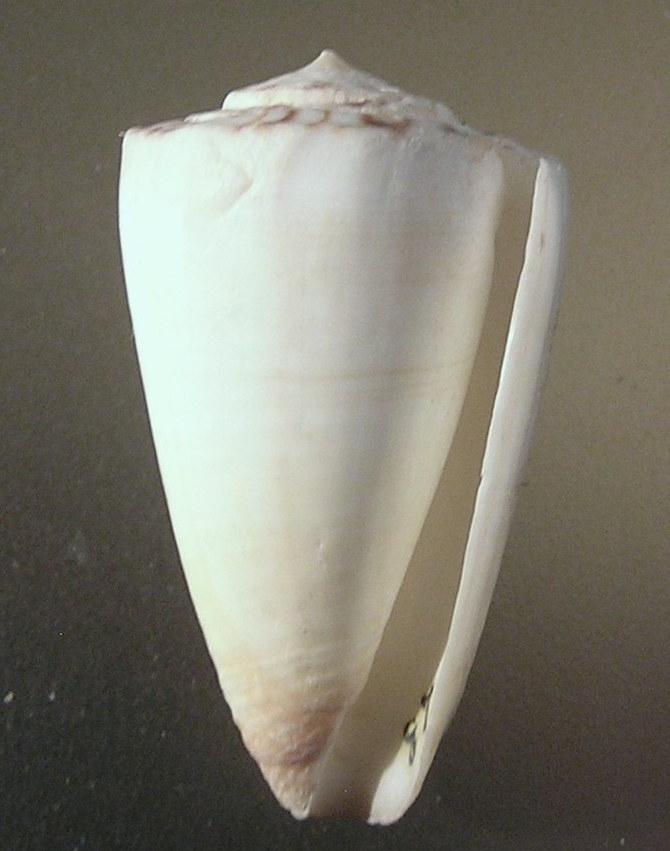
- Apertural view of a shell of Conus reductaspiralis

Conservation status
- Least Concern (IUCN 3.1)

Scientific classification
- Kingdom: Animalia
- Phylum: Mollusca
- Class: Gastropoda
- Subclass: Caenogastropoda
- Order: Neogastropoda
- Superfamily: Conoidea
- Family: Conidae
- Genus: Conus
- Species: C. reductaspiralis

Binomial name
- Conus reductaspiralis Walls, 1979

Synonyms
- Conus (Splinoconus) reductaspiralis Walls, 1979 · alternate representation; Conus nielsenae reductaspiralis Walls, 1979 · superseded rank; Kioconus (Ongoconus) reductaspiralis (Walls, 1979) · unaccepted; Kioconus reductaspiralis (Walls, 1979) · unaccepted

= Conus reductaspiralis =

Species of sea snail

Conus reductaspiralis, commonly known as Nielsen's cone, is a species of predatory sea snail, a marine gastropod mollusk in the family Conidae, the cone snails. It is endemic to waters off Western Australia.

Like other cone snails, it is a predator and uses venom to immobilize its prey.

== Description ==
The shell is between 27 and 51 mm long. The holotype measures 33.4 by 18.3 mm.

== Taxonomy ==
Jerry G. Walls introduced the taxon in 1979 as Conus nielsenae reductaspiralis, a subspecies of Conus nielsenae, in the journal The Pariah. The holotype, catalog number DMNH 122119, was collected at Geraldton, Western Australia, and deposited in the Delaware Museum of Natural History.

The taxon was subsequently treated as a separate species. MolluscaBase accepts the name Conus reductaspiralis, lists Conus (Splinoconus) reductaspiralis as an alternative representation, and regards the former subspecies name as a superseded rank. Names placing the species in Kioconus are listed as unaccepted. The Australian Faunal Directory uses the subgeneric form Conus (Splinoconus) reductaspiralis as its accepted name.

The separation of C. reductaspiralis, C. nielsenae and C. thevenardensis has been disputed. The IUCN assessment followed Australian specialists in treating all three as distinct species. A molecular classification published in 2015 retained most cone-snail species in Conus and recognized 57 subgenera within the genus.

== Distribution ==
The species is endemic to Australia and occurs off Western Australia. The IUCN assessment described it as widely distributed within the state. Its type locality is Geraldton.

== Conservation ==
The IUCN classified Conus reductaspiralis as Least Concern. Its assessment described the species as locally abundant and occurring in several marine protected areas. No specific threats were identified in the assessment.
