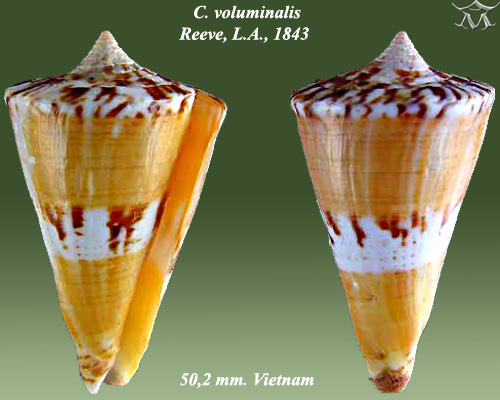
- Apertural and abapertural views of shell of Conus voluminalis Reeve, L.A., 1843
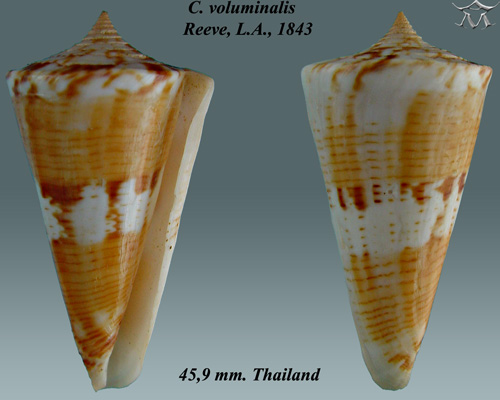

Conservation status
- Least Concern (IUCN 3.1)

Scientific classification
- Kingdom: Animalia
- Phylum: Mollusca
- Class: Gastropoda
- Subclass: Caenogastropoda
- Order: Neogastropoda
- Superfamily: Conoidea
- Family: Conidae
- Genus: Conus
- Species: C. voluminalis

Binomial name
- Conus voluminalis Reeve, 1843

Synonyms
- Conus (Splinoconus) voluminalis Reeve, 1843 · accepted, alternate representation; Conus clandestinatous Shikama, 1979; Conus (Ammirales) filicinctus Schepman, 1913; Conus macarae Bernardi, 1857; Conus (Rhizoconus) clandestinatous Shikama, T. 1979; Kioconus voluminalis macarae Bernardi, 1857

= Conus voluminalis =

Species of sea snail

Conus voluminalis, common name the voluminous cone or the roller cone, is a species of sea snail, a marine gastropod mollusk in the family Conidae, the cone snails and their allies.

Like all species within the genus Conus, these snails are predatory and venomous. They are capable of stinging humans, therefore live ones should be handled carefully or not at all.

Subspecies

- † Conus voluminalis avus Pilsbry, 1905 (taxon inquirendum)

== Description ==
The size of the shell varies between 30 mm and 72 mm. The color of the shell is whitish or yellowish white, usually faintly lined with yellow or light chestnut, with two bands of irregular longitudinal light chestnut blotches.

== Distribution ==
This marine species occurs from the Maldives to Western Australia; off the Ryukyu Islands. & Taiwan; off the Solomons & Papua New Guinea
