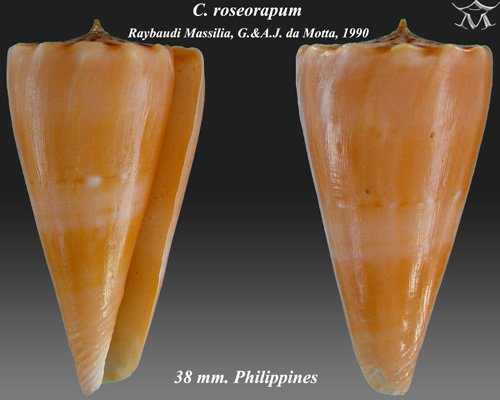
- Apertural and abapertural views of shell of Conus roseorapum Raybaudi Massilia, G. & A.J. da Motta, 1990
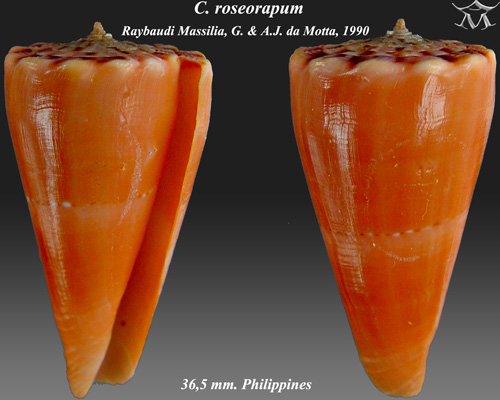

Conservation status
- Least Concern (IUCN 3.1)

Scientific classification
- Kingdom: Animalia
- Phylum: Mollusca
- Class: Gastropoda
- Subclass: Caenogastropoda
- Order: Neogastropoda
- Superfamily: Conoidea
- Family: Conidae
- Genus: Conus
- Species: C. roseorapum

Binomial name
- Conus roseorapum G. Raybaudi & da Motta, 1990

Synonyms
- Conus (Splinoconus) roseorapum G. Raybaudi & da Motta, 1990 · accepted, alternate representation; Kioconus roseorapum (G. Raybaudi & da Motta, 1990)

= Conus roseorapum =

Species of sea snail

Conus roseorapum is a species of sea snail, a marine gastropod mollusk in the family Conidae, the cone snails and their allies.

Like all species within the genus Conus, these snails are predatory and venomous. They are capable of stinging humans, therefore live ones should be handled carefully or not at all.

== Description ==
Original description: "Shell obconical, medium-sized to 70 mm, with a flat spire and acutely pointed double-whorl apex, consisting of eleven whorls, the first four post-nuclear ones distinctly stepped and obsoletely beaded; the next six having a flat top, ending with an undulating penultimate whorl causing its angulate shoulder to appear coronated. Surface of whorls are spirally striated with moderately channeled suture. The body whorl is subcylindrically elongate, with tapering straight sides, wrinkled with indistinct sulci at its base. The shell has a distinct waxy gloss with a ground colour of brownish pink and is encircled at its mid-section with a band of a paler shade. Coloration is also seen in violet and milky brown. The body whorl itself has no maculations, but the spire is sprinkled with dark brown blotches, some being arcuate, in an irregular pattern. The shell is comparatively light in weight with a tranchant outer lip; its aperture laterally narrow, lavender colored within."

The size of the shell varies between 32 mm and 80 mm.

== Distribution ==
Locus typicus: "Bohol Island, Philippines."

This marine species occurs off the Philippines and in the South China Sea.
