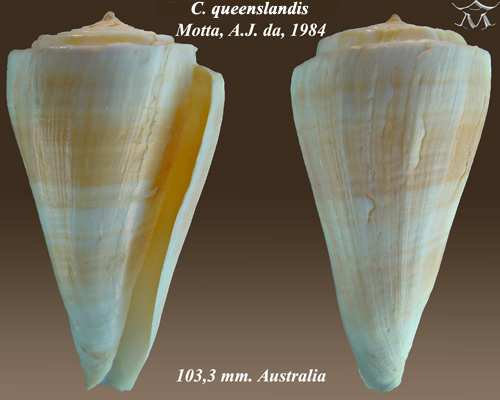
- Apertural and abapertural views of shell of Conus queenslandis Motta, A.J.da,1984
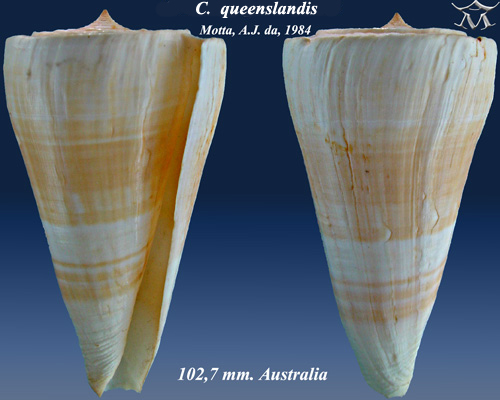

Scientific classification
- Kingdom: Animalia
- Phylum: Mollusca
- Class: Gastropoda
- Subclass: Caenogastropoda
- Order: Neogastropoda
- Superfamily: Conoidea
- Family: Conidae
- Genus: Conus
- Species: C. queenslandis

Binomial name
- Conus queenslandis da Motta, 1984

Synonyms
- Conus (Splinoconus) queenslandis da Motta, 1984 · accepted, alternate representation; Conus tribblei queenslandis da Motta, 1984

= Conus queenslandis =

Species of sea snail

Conus queenslandis is a species of sea snail, a marine gastropod mollusk in the family Conidae, the cone snails and their relatives.

Like all species within the genus Conus, these snails are predatory and venomous. They are capable of stinging humans, therefore live ones should be handled carefully or not at all.

== Taxonomic relation ==
Conus queenslandis was originally named as a subspecies of Conus tribblei Walls, 1977 but has been recognized as a valid species, alternative representation in the subgenus Splinoconus..

== Description ==
The size of the shell varies between 60 mm and 110 mm.

== Distribution ==
This marine species occurs off Vietnam, New Caledonia, and Queensland; Australia.
