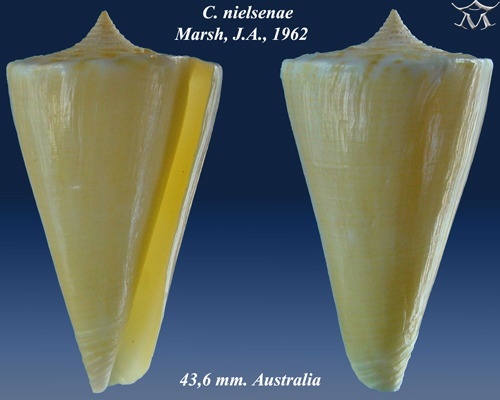
- Apertural and abapertural views of shell of Conus nielsenae Marsh, J.A., 1962

Scientific classification
- Kingdom: Animalia
- Phylum: Mollusca
- Class: Gastropoda
- Subclass: Caenogastropoda
- Order: Neogastropoda
- Superfamily: Conoidea
- Family: Conidae
- Genus: Conus
- Species: C. nielsenae

Binomial name
- Conus nielsenae Marsh, 1962

Synonyms
- Conus (Splinoconus) nielsenae Marsh, 1962 · accepted, alternate representation; Kioconus nielsenae (Marsh, 1962)

= Conus nielsenae =

Species of sea snail

Conus nielsenae, common name Nielsen's cone, is a species of sea snail, a marine gastropod mollusk in the family Conidae, the cone snails and their allies.

Like all species within the genus Conus, these snails are predatory and venomous. They are capable of stinging humans, therefore live ones should be handled carefully or not at all.

== Notes ==
Additional information regarding this species:

- Taxonomy: The status of Conus nielsenae, Conus reductaspiralis and Conus thevenardensis has been disputed by some authors, but Australian specialists generally regard them as distinct. For conservation evaluation, all three are here listed as distinct.

The subspecies Conus nielsenae reductaspiralis Walls, 1979 is a synonym of Conus reductaspiralis Walls, 1979

== Description ==
The size of the shell varies between 28 mm and 55 mm.

== Distribution ==
This marine species occurs off the Kermadec Islands and off Australia (New South Wales, Queensland).
