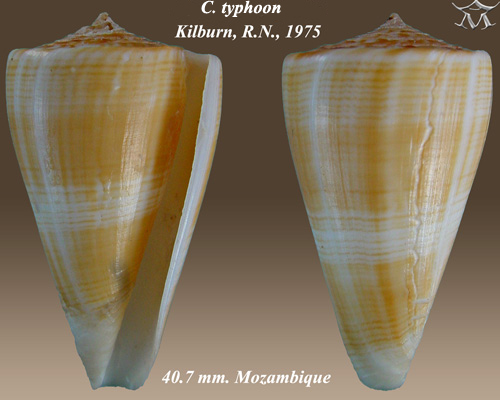
- Apertural and abapertural views of shell of Conus typhoon Kilburn, R.N., 1975
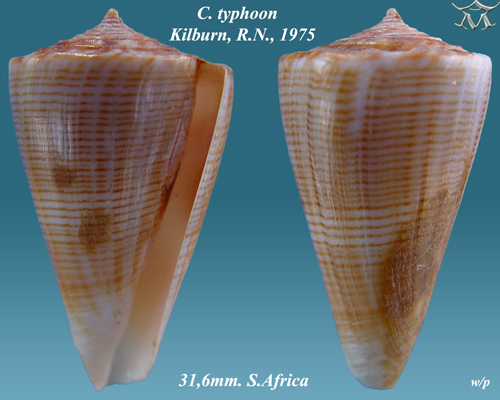

Conservation status
- Least Concern (IUCN 3.1)

Scientific classification
- Kingdom: Animalia
- Phylum: Mollusca
- Class: Gastropoda
- Subclass: Caenogastropoda
- Order: Neogastropoda
- Superfamily: Conoidea
- Family: Conidae
- Genus: Conus
- Species: C. typhon

Binomial name
- Conus typhon Kilburn, 1975

Synonyms
- Conus (Splinoconus) typhon Kilburn, 1975 · accepted, alternate representation; Kioconus typhon (Kilburn, 1975)

= Conus typhon =

Species of sea snail

Conus typhon, common name the typhon cone, is a species of sea snail, a marine gastropod mollusk in the family Conidae, the cone snails and their allies.

Like all species within the genus Conus, these snails are predatory and venomous. They are capable of stinging humans, therefore live ones should be handled carefully or not at all.

== Description ==
The size of the shell varies between 28 mm and 91 mm.

== Distribution ==
This marine species occurs from the Port Elizabeth area in South Africa to the coast of East Africa.
