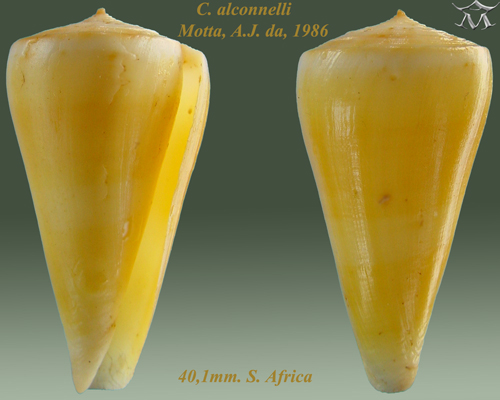
- Apertural and abapertural views of shell of Conus alconnelli Motta, A.J. da, 1986

Conservation status
- Least Concern (IUCN 3.1)

Scientific classification
- Kingdom: Animalia
- Phylum: Mollusca
- Class: Gastropoda
- Subclass: Caenogastropoda
- Order: Neogastropoda
- Superfamily: Conoidea
- Family: Conidae
- Genus: Conus
- Species: C. alconnelli

Binomial name
- Conus alconnelli da Motta, 1986

Synonyms
- Conus pennasilicorum Bozzetti, 2017; Conus (Splinoconus) alconnelli da Motta, 1986· accepted, alternate representation; Kioconus alconnelli (da Motta, 1986)

= Conus alconnelli =

Species of sea snail

Conus alconnelli, common name, the Lemonglass cone is a species of sea snail, a marine gastropod mollusk in the family Conidae, the cone snails and their allies.

== Behavior ==
Like all species within the genus Conus, these snails are predatory and venomous. They are capable of stinging humans, therefore live ones should be handled carefully or not at all.

== Description ==
The sizeof the shell varies between 27.5 mm and 90 mm.

== Distribution ==
This species occurs in the Indian Ocean from Southeast Africa, and Madagascar to Oman; and off the Mascarenes and Northern Transkei, South Africa.
