= Conus caillaudi =

Conservation status
- Least Concern (IUCN 3.1)

Scientific classification
- Kingdom: Animalia
- Phylum: Mollusca
- Class: Gastropoda
- Subclass: Caenogastropoda
- Order: Neogastropoda
- Superfamily: Conoidea
- Family: Conidae
- Genus: Conus
- Species: C. caillaudi

Binomial name
- Conus caillaudi Kiener, 1845

Synonyms
- Conus (Splinoconus) caillaudi Kiener, 1846; Kioconus (Ongoconus) caillaudi (Kiener, 1846); Kioconus caillaudi (Kiener, 1846)

Species of sea snail

Conus caillaudi is a species of sea snail, a marine gastropod mollusk in the family Conidae, the cone snails and their allies.

Like all species within the genus Conus, these snails are predatory and venomous. They are capable of stinging humans, therefore live ones should be handled carefully or not at all.

== Description ==
The size of the shell varies between 24 mm and 55 mm, with an oblong pointed shape, tan in color spotting darker stripes that start out straight and then leaning diagonally as it nears the tip.

== Distribution ==
This marine species occurs at Cargados Carajos in the Red Sea, in the Indian Ocean off Mauritius and off Réunion.
