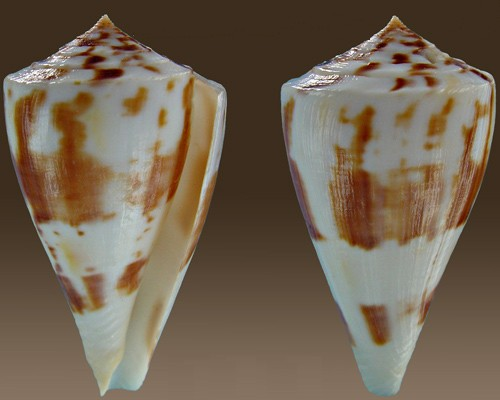

Conservation status
- Least Concern (IUCN 3.1)

Scientific classification
- Kingdom: Animalia
- Phylum: Mollusca
- Class: Gastropoda
- Subclass: Caenogastropoda
- Order: Neogastropoda
- Superfamily: Conoidea
- Family: Conidae
- Genus: Conus
- Species: C. lenavati

Binomial name
- Conus lenavati da Motta & Röckel, 1982

Synonyms
- Conus (Splinoconus) lenavati da Motta & Röckel, 1982 · accepted, alternate representation; Kioconus lenavati (da Motta & Röckel, 1982)

= Conus lenavati =

Species of sea snail

Conus lenavati is a species of sea snail, a marine gastropod mollusk in the family Conidae. It was first described by da Motta and Röckel in 1982.

Like all species within the genus Conus, these snails are predatory and venomous. They are capable of stinging humans, thus requiring careful handling.

== Description ==
The species has an obconical shell, between 38 mm and 91 mm in length. The shell has a whorled spire with exactly twelve whorls. The individual whorls have multiple spiral thread-like ridges, while the largest whorl is smooth with sulcus-shaped grooves.

Coloration of the shell is generally between white and cream, with two incomplete bands of brown around the main portion of the shell (below the spire). There are also randomly distributed brown spots across the spire.

== Distribution ==
This marine species occurs off the Philippines and in the South China Sea. It was first discovered near Cebu Island.
