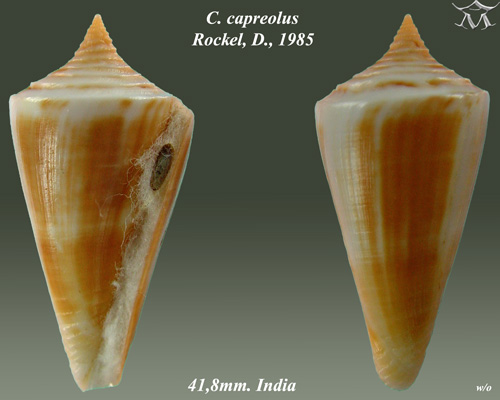
- Apertural and abapertural views of shell of Conus capreolus Rockel, D., 1985

Conservation status
- Data Deficient (IUCN 3.1)

Scientific classification
- Kingdom: Animalia
- Phylum: Mollusca
- Class: Gastropoda
- Subclass: Caenogastropoda
- Order: Neogastropoda
- Superfamily: Conoidea
- Family: Conidae
- Genus: Conus
- Species: C. capreolus

Binomial name
- Conus capreolus Röckel, 1985

Synonyms
- Conus (Splinoconus) capreolus Röckel, 1985 accepted, alternate representation; Conus semisulcatus G. B. Sowerby II, 1870 (Invalid: junior homonym of Conus semisulcatus Bronn, 1831); Kioconus capreolus (Röckel, 1985)

= Conus capreolus =

Species of sea snail

Conus capreolus is a species of sea snail, a marine gastropod mollusk in the family Conidae, the cone snails and their allies.

Like all species within the genus Conus, these snails are predatory and venomous. They are capable of stinging humans, therefore live ones should be handled carefully or not at all.

== Description ==
The size of the shell varies between 36 mm and 65 mm.

== Distribution ==
Conus capreolus are native to the coastal waters of the Andhra Pradesh, Odisha, West Bengal, Bangladesh, Myanmar and the Andaman coast of Thailand.
