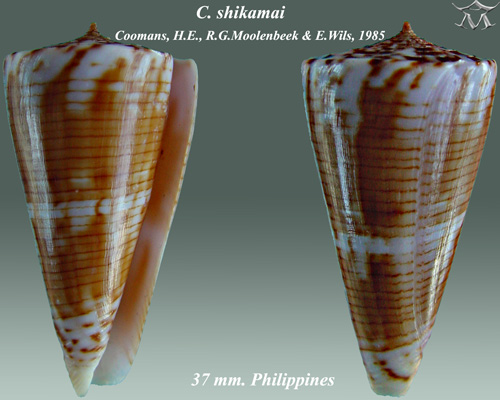
- Apertural and abapertural views of shell of Conus shikamai Coomans, H.E., R.G.Moolenbeek & E.Wils, 1985
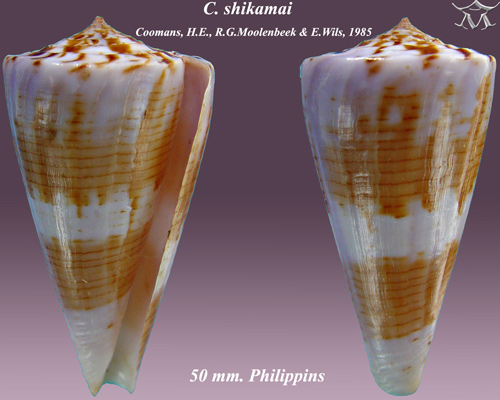

Scientific classification
- Kingdom: Animalia
- Phylum: Mollusca
- Class: Gastropoda
- Subclass: Caenogastropoda
- Order: Neogastropoda
- Superfamily: Conoidea
- Family: Conidae
- Genus: Conus
- Species: C. shikamai

Binomial name
- Conus shikamai Coomans, Moolenbeek & Wils, 1985

Synonyms
- Conus (Splinoconus) shikamai Coomans, Moolenbeek & Wils, 1985 · accepted, alternate representation; Conus clandestinus Shikama, 1979 (nomen nudum); Conus clandestinus purpuratus Shikama, 1979 (Invalid: junior homonym of Conus purpuratus (Röding, 1798); Conus shikamai is a replacement name); Kioconus shikamai (Coomans, Moolenbeek & Wils, 1985); Splinoconus shikamai (Coomans, Moolenbeek & Wils, 1985)

= Conus shikamai =

Species of sea snail

Conus shikamai is a species of sea snail, a marine gastropod mollusk in the family Conidae, the cone snails and their allies.

Like all species within the genus Conus, these snails are predatory and venomous. They are capable of stinging humans, therefore live ones should be handled carefully or not at all.

== Description ==
The size of the shell varies between 40 mm and 70 mm.

== Distribution ==
This marine species is primarily discovered in the tropical waters of the In-Pacific, around Taiwan, the Philippines and Indonesia.
