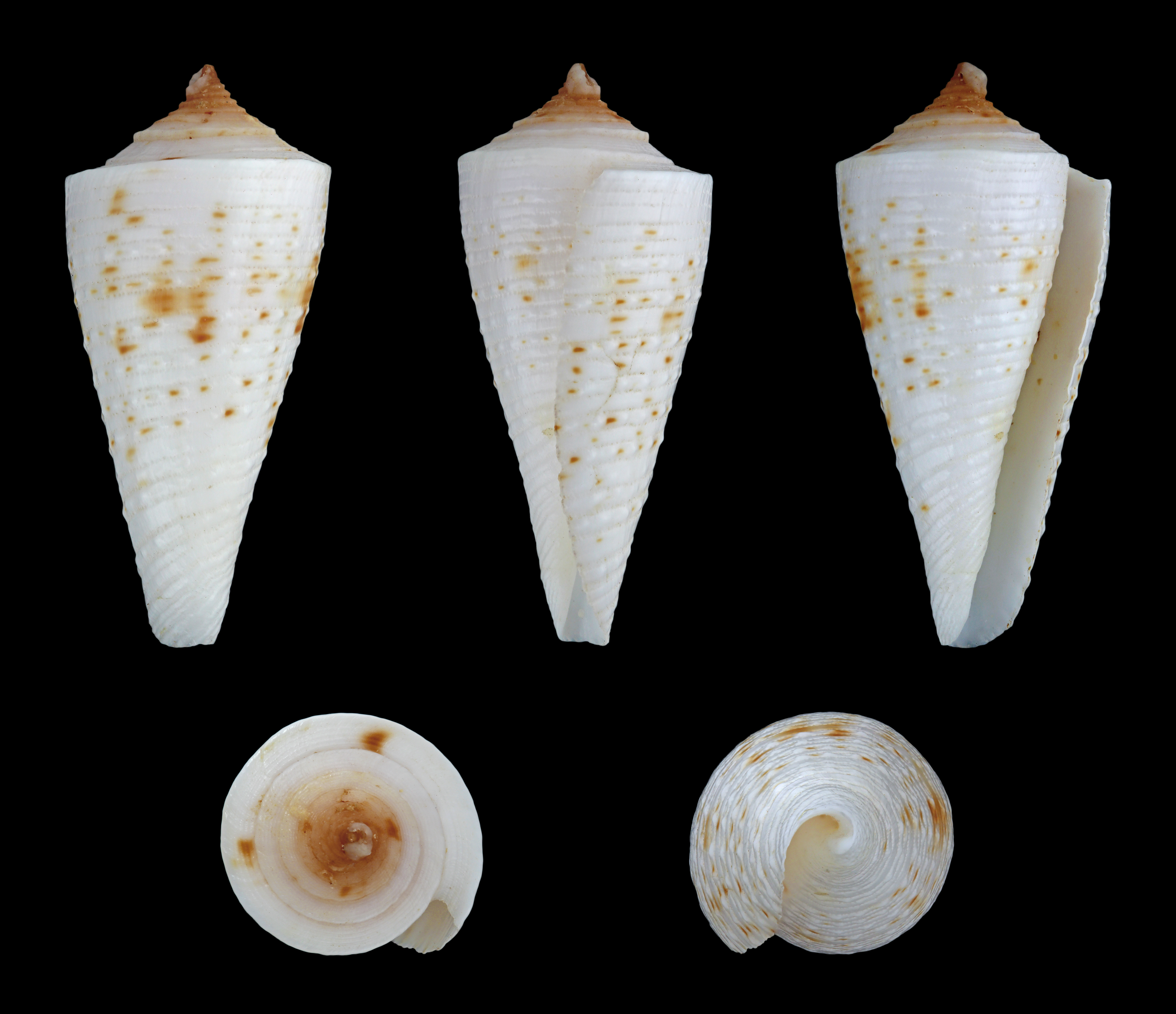
- Apertural and abapertural views of shell of Conus tribblei Walls, J.G., 1977

Conservation status
- Least Concern (IUCN 3.1)

Scientific classification
- Kingdom: Animalia
- Phylum: Mollusca
- Class: Gastropoda
- Subclass: Caenogastropoda
- Order: Neogastropoda
- Superfamily: Conoidea
- Family: Conidae
- Genus: Conus
- Species: C. tribblei

Binomial name
- Conus tribblei Walls, 1977

Synonyms
- Conus (Splinoconus) tribblei Walls, 1977 · accepted, alternate representation; Conus suluensis Shikama, 1979; Kioconus tribblei (Walls, 1977); Rhizoconus suluensis Shikama, T., 1979

= Conus tribblei =

Species of sea snail

Conus tribblei, common name Tribble's cone, is a species of sea snail, a marine gastropod mollusk in the family Conidae, the cone snails and their allies.

Like all species within the genus Conus, these snails are predatory and venomous. They are capable of stinging humans, therefore live ones should be handled carefully or not at all.

This species was named after the pet cat of Jerry Walls, the original discoverer.

The subspecies Conus tribblei queenslandis da Motta, 1984: is a synonym of Conus queenslandis da Motta, 1984

== Description ==
The size of the shell varies between 42 mm and 138 mm.

== Distribution ==
This marine species occurs off Japan, Taiwan, Vietnam, the Philippines, the Solomon Islands, and Australia (Western Australia).
