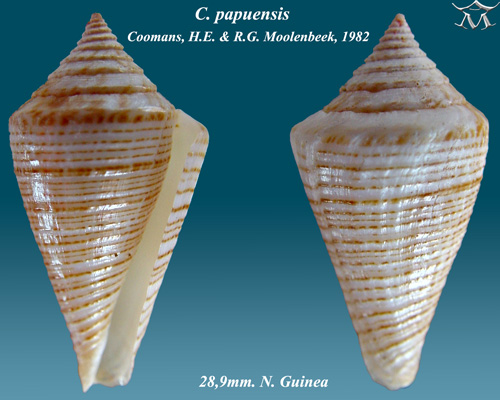
- Apertural and abapertural views of shell of Conus papuensis Coomans, H.E. & R.G. Moolenbeek, 1982

Conservation status
- Least Concern (IUCN 3.1)

Scientific classification
- Kingdom: Animalia
- Phylum: Mollusca
- Class: Gastropoda
- Subclass: Caenogastropoda
- Order: Neogastropoda
- Superfamily: Conoidea
- Family: Conidae
- Genus: Conus
- Species: C. papuensis

Binomial name
- Conus papuensis Coomans & Moolenbeek, 1982

Synonyms
- Conus (Splinoconus) papuensis Coomans & Moolenbeek, 1982 · accepted, alternate representation; Conus moylani Delsaerdt, 2000; Kioconus papuensis (Coomans & Moolenbeek, 1982)

= Conus papuensis =

Species of sea snail

Conus papuensis is a species of sea snail, a marine gastropod mollusk in the family Conidae, the cone snails and their allies.

Like all species within the genus Conus, these snails are predatory and venomous. They are capable of stinging humans; therefore, live ones should be handled carefully or not at all.

== Description ==
The size of the shell varies between 19 mm and 36 mm.

== Distribution ==
This marine species occurs off Eastern New Guinea.
