= Conus gondwanensis =

Conservation status
- Least Concern (IUCN 3.1)

Scientific classification
- Kingdom: Animalia
- Phylum: Mollusca
- Class: Gastropoda
- Subclass: Caenogastropoda
- Order: Neogastropoda
- Superfamily: Conoidea
- Family: Conidae
- Genus: Conus
- Species: C. gondwanensis

Binomial name
- Conus gondwanensis Röckel & Moolenbeek, 1995

Synonyms
- Conus (Turriconus) gondwanensis Röckel & Moolenbeek, 1995 accepted, alternate representation; Kioconus gondwanensis (Röckel & Moolenbeek, 1995); Turriconus (Kurodaconus) gondwanensis (Röckel & Moolenbeek, 1995)

Species of sea snail

Conus gondwanensis is a species of sea snail, a marine gastropod mollusk in the family Conidae, the cone snails and their allies.

Like all species within the genus Conus, these snails are predatory and venomous. They are capable of stinging humans, therefore live ones should be handled carefully or not at all.

== Description ==
The size of the shell attains 20 mm.

== Distribution ==
This marine species occurs off New Caledonia.
