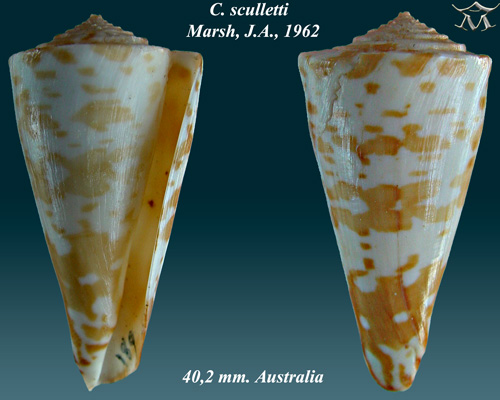
- Apertural and abapertural views of shell of Conus sculletti (Marsh, J.A., 1962)

Scientific classification
- Kingdom: Animalia
- Phylum: Mollusca
- Class: Gastropoda
- Subclass: Caenogastropoda
- Order: Neogastropoda
- Family: Conidae
- Genus: Conasprella
- Subgenus: Endemoconus; Iredale, 1931

Synonyms
- Endemoconus Iredale, 1931; Kermasprella A. W. B. Powell, 1958; Mamiconus Cotton & Godfrey, 1932; Yeddoconus J. K. Tucker & M. Tenorio, 2009

= Conasprella (Endemoconus) =

Subgenus of gastropods

Endemoconus is subgenus of sea snails, marine gastropod mollusks in the genus Conasprella, family Conidae, the cone snails and their allies.

In the new classification of the family Conidae by Puillandre N., Duda T.F., Meyer C., Olivera B.M. & Bouchet P. (2015), Endemoconus has become a subgenus of Conasprella: Conasprella (Endemoconus) Tucker & Tenorio, 2009 represented as Conasprella Thiele, 1929. Three species have become synonyms of a Conus species.

== Distinguishing characteristics ==
The Tucker & Tenorio 2009 taxonomy distinguishes Endemoconus from Conus in the following ways:

- Genus Conus sensu stricto Linnaeus, 1758

Shell characters (living and fossil species)

The basic shell shape is conical to elongated conical, has a deep anal notch on the shoulder, a smooth periostracum and a small operculum. The shoulder of the shell is usually nodulose and the protoconch is usually multispiral. Markings often include the presence of tents except for black or white color variants, with the absence of spiral lines of minute tents and textile bars.

Radular tooth (not known for fossil species)

The radula has an elongated anterior section with serrations and a large exposed terminating cusp, a non-obvious waist, blade is either small or absent and has a short barb, and lacks a basal spur.

Geographical distribution

These species are found in the Indo-Pacific region.

Feeding habits

These species eat other gastropods including cones.

- Subgenus Endemoconus Iredale, 1931

Shell characters (living and fossil species)

The shell is turbinate with a scalariform spire. The protoconch is either paucispiral or multispiral. Whorl tops are concave and do not have cords. Nodules may be absent or may be present and persist on all whorls. A dentiform plait is present. The anal notch is shallow, and the anterior notch is absent. The periostracum is tufted and the operculum is small to moderate in size.

Radular tooth (not known for fossil species)

The anterior section of the radula is much longer than the posterior section. The blade is short, a basal spur is absent, and the barb is short. The radular tooth has no serrations. An accessory process is present and is a short, simple triangular terminating cusp.

Geographical distribution

These species are found from Australia to New Zealand and in Madagascar.

Feeding habits

Unknown, however these species are believed to be piscivorous based upon Bayesian cladistics analysis.

== Species list ==
This list of species is based on the information in the World Register of Marine Species (WoRMS) list. Species within the genus Endemoconus include:

- Endemoconus bonfigliolii Bozzetti, 2010: synonym of Conus bonfigliolii (Bozzetti, 2010)
- Endemoconus boucheti (Richard, 1983): synonym of Conasprella boucheti (Richard, 1983)
- Endemoconus grohi (Tenorio & Poppe, 2004): synonym of Conasprella grohi (Tenorio & Poppe, 2004)
- Endemoconus howelli (Iredale, 1929): synonym of Conasprella howelli Iredale, 1929
- Endemoconus ichinoseanus (Kuroda, 1956): synonym of Conasprella ichinoseana (Kuroda, 1956)
- Endemoconus ione (Fulton, 1938): synonym of Conasprella ione (Fulton, 1938)
- Endemoconus lozeti (Richard, 1980): synonym of Conus lozeti Richard, 1980
- Endemoconus nadaensis Azuma & Toki, 1970: synonym of Conasprella articulata (G. B. Sowerby II, 1873)
- Endemoconus otohimeae (Kuroda & Itô, 1961): synonym of Conasprella otohimeae (Kuroda & Itô, 1961)
- Endemoconus raoulensis (Powell, 1958): synonym of Conasprella raoulensis Powell, 1958
- Endemoconus sculletti (Marsh, 1962): synonym of Conus sculletti Marsh, 1962
- Endemoconus sieboldii (Reeve, 1848): synonym of Conasprella sieboldii (Reeve, 1848)
- Endemoconus somalicus (Bozzetti, 2013): synonym of Conasprella somalica (Bozzetti, 2013)
- Endemoconus spirofilis (Habe & Kosuge, 1970): synonym of Conasprella spirofilis (Habe & Kosuge, 1970)

== Significance of "alternative representation" ==
Prior to 2009, all species within the family Conidae were placed in one genus, Conus. In 2009 however, J.K. Tucker and M.J. Tenorio proposed a classification system for the over 600 recognized species that were in the family. Their classification proposed 3 distinct families and 82 genera for the living species of cone snails. This classification was based upon shell morphology, radular differences, anatomy, physiology, cladistics, with comparisons to molecular (DNA) studies. Published accounts of genera within the Conidae that include the genus Endemoconus include J.K. Tucker & M.J. Tenorio (2009), and Bouchet et al. (2011).

Testing in order to try to understand the molecular phylogeny of the Conidae was initially begun by Christopher Meyer and Alan Kohn, and is continuing, particularly with the advent of nuclear DNA testing in addition to mDNA testing.

However, in 2011, some experts still prefer to use the traditional classification, where all species are placed in Conus within the single family Conidae: for example, according to the current November 2011 version of the World Register of Marine Species, all species within the family Conidae are in the genus Conus. The binomial names of species in the 82 cone snail genera listed in Tucker & Tenorio 2009 are recognized by the World Register of Marine Species as "alternative representations." Debate within the scientific community regarding this issue continues, and additional molecular phylogeny studies are being carried out in an attempt to clarify the issue.

All this has been superseded in 2015 by the new classification of the Conidae
