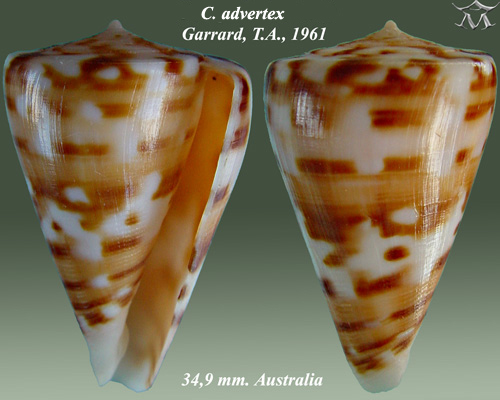
- Apertural and abapertural views of shell of Conus advertex (Garrard, T.A., 1961)

Scientific classification
- Kingdom: Animalia
- Phylum: Mollusca
- Class: Gastropoda
- Subclass: Caenogastropoda
- Order: Neogastropoda
- Family: Conidae
- Genus: Conus
- Subgenus: Plicaustraconus; Moolenbeek, 2008

Type species
- Conus advertex (Garrard, 1961)

Synonyms
- Plicaustraconus Moolenbeek, 2008

= Conus (Plicaustraconus) =

Subgenus of gastropods

Plicaustraconus is a subgenus of sea snails, marine gastropod mollusks in the genus Conus, family Conidae, the cone snails and their allies.

In the latest classification of the family Conidae by Puillandre N., Duda T.F., Meyer C., Olivera B.M. & Bouchet P. (2015), Plicaustraconus has become a subgenus of Conus as Conus (Plicaustraconus) Moolenbeek, 2008 (type species:Conus advertex (Garrard, 1961)) represented as Conus Linnaeus, 1758

== Distinguishing characteristics ==
The Tucker & Tenorio 2009 taxonomy distinguishes Monteiroconus from Conus in the following ways:

- Genus Conus sensu stricto Linnaeus, 1758

Shell characters (living and fossil species)

The basic shell shape is conical to elongated conical, has a deep anal notch on the shoulder, a smooth periostracum and a small operculum. The shoulder of the shell is usually nodulose and the protoconch is usually multispiral. Markings often include the presence of tents except for black or white color variants, with the absence of spiral lines of minute tents and textile bars.

Radular tooth (not known for fossil species)

The radula has an elongated anterior section with serrations and a large exposed terminating cusp, a non-obvious waist, blade is either small or absent and has a short barb, and lacks a basal spur.

Geographical distribution

These species are found in the Indo-Pacific region.

Feeding habits

These species eat other gastropods including cones.

- Subgenus Plicaustraconus Moolenbeek, 2008

Shell characters (living and fossil species)

The shell is obconic in shape with broad shoulders. The protoconch is paucispiral. The whorl tops have cords, and there is a well developed dentiform plait. The anal notch is shallow to relatively deep, and an anterior notch is absent. The periostracum is smooth, and the operculum is large.

Radular tooth (not known for fossil species)

The anterior section of the radular tooth is shorter than the posterior section, and the blade covers between one-third and two-thirds of the length of the anterior section. A basal spur is present, and the barb is short. There are one or two rows of serrations.

Geographical distribution

The species in this genus occur in the Australian and South African regions.

Feeding habits

These cone snails are presumed vermivorous, meaning that the cones prey on polychaete worms, based upon the radular tooth morphology.

== Species list ==
This list of species is based on the information in the World Register of Marine Species (WoRMS) list. Species within the genus Plicaustraconus include:

- Plicaustraconus advertex (Garrard, 1961): synonym of Conus advertex (Garrard, 1961)
- Plicaustraconus angasi (Tryon, 1884): synonym of Conus angasi Tryon, 1884
- Plicaustraconus baeri (Röckel & Korn, 1992): synonym of Conus (Plicaustraconus) baeri Röckel & Korn, 1992 represented as Conus baeri Röckel & Korn, 1992
- Plicaustraconus bonfigliolii (Bozzetti, 2010): synonym of Conus bonfigliolii (Bozzetti, 2010)
- Plicaustraconus felix (Fenzan, 2012): synonym of Conus (Plicaustraconus) felix Fenzan, 2012 represented as Conus felix Fenzan, 2012
- Plicaustraconus lozeti (Richard, 1980): synonym of Conus lozeti Richard, 1980
- Plicaustraconus trigonus (Reeve, 1848): synonym of Conus trigonus Reeve, 1848
- Plicaustraconus visagenus (Kilburn, 1974): synonym of Conus visagenus Kilburn, 1974
- Plicaustraconus wallangra (Garrard, 1961): synonym of Conus wallangra (Garrard, 1961)
