= Malagasyconus =

Scientific classification
- Kingdom: Animalia
- Phylum: Mollusca
- Class: Gastropoda
- Subclass: Caenogastropoda
- Order: Neogastropoda
- Superfamily: Conoidea
- Family: Conidae
- Genus: Malagasyconus; Monnier & Tenorio, 2015

Type species
- Conus lozeti Richard, 1980

Genus of gastropods

Malagasyconus is a genus of sea snails, marine gastropod mollusks in the family Conidae.

== Habitat ==
This genus is found in the following habitats:

- Marine

== Species ==
The following species were brought into synonymy:

- Malagasyconus bonfigliolii (Bozzetti, 2010): synonym of Conus (Malagasyconus) bonfigliolii (Bozzetti, 2010) represented as Conus bonfigliolii (Bozzetti, 2010)
- Malagasyconus lozeti (Richard, 1980): synonym of Conus (Malagasyconus) lozeti Richard, 1980 represented as Conus lozeti Richard, 1980
