= C. articulatus =

C. articulatus can refer to a few different species. The specific epithet articulatus means 'jointed' or 'articulated.'

- Celastrus articulatus, synonym for Celastrus orbiculatus, a plant in the family Celastraceae
- Ceocephalus articulatus, a weevil in the family Brentidae
- Cereus articulatus, a cactus in the family Cactaceae
- Chiton articulatus, a mollusk in the family Chitonidae
- Chlorocyperus articulatus, synonym for Cyperus articulatus, a sedge in the family Cyperaceae
- Chondrophycus articulatus, a seaweed in the family Rhodomelaceae
- Coleus articulatus, a plant in the family Lamiaceae
- Conus articulatus, synonym for Conasprella articulata, a sea snail in the family Conidae
- Corynephorus articulatus, a grass in the family Poaceae
- Crotalocephalus articulatus, a species of Crotalocephalus trilobite
- Curio articulatus, a plant in the family Asteraceae
- Cyclosorus articulatus, a fern in the family Thelypteridaceae
- Cyperus articulatus, a sedge in the family Cyperaceae
