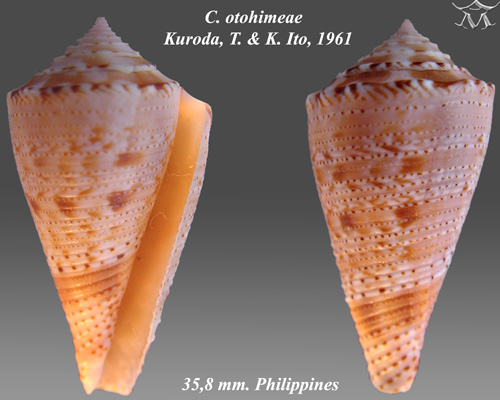
- Apertural and abapertural views of shell of Conasprella otohimeae Kuroda, T. & K. Ito, 1961
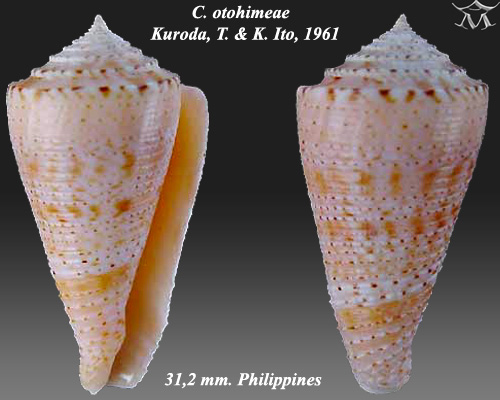

Conservation status
- Least Concern (IUCN 3.1)

Scientific classification
- Kingdom: Animalia
- Phylum: Mollusca
- Class: Gastropoda
- Subclass: Caenogastropoda
- Order: Neogastropoda
- Superfamily: Conoidea
- Family: Conidae
- Genus: Conasprella
- Species: C. otohimeae

Binomial name
- Conasprella otohimeae (Kuroda & Itô, 1961)

Synonyms
- Conasprella (Conasprella) otohimeae (Kuroda & Itô, 1961) · accepted, alternate representation; Conus otohimeae Kuroda & Itô, 1961 (original combination); Conus rogmartini da Motta, 1982; Duodenticonus otohimeae (Kuroda & Itô, 1961); Endemoconus otohimeae (Kuroda & Itô, 1961); Yeddoconus otohimeae (Kuroda & Itô, 1961)

= Conasprella otohimeae =

Species of gastropod

Conasprella otohimeae, common name Otohime's cone, is a species of sea snail, a marine gastropod mollusk in the family Conidae, the cone snails and their relatives.

Like all species within the genus Conasprella, these snails are predatory and venomous. They are capable of stinging humans, therefore live ones should be handled carefully or not at all.

== Description ==
The size of the shell varies between 22 and 40 mm (0.87 and 1.57 in).

== Distribution ==
This marine species occurs from Southern Japan to the Philippines.
