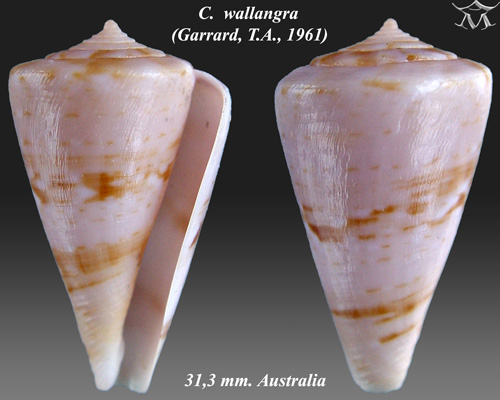
- Apertural and abapertural views of shell of Conus wallangra (Garrard, T.A., 1961)

Conservation status
- Data Deficient (IUCN 3.1)

Scientific classification
- Kingdom: Animalia
- Phylum: Mollusca
- Class: Gastropoda
- Subclass: Caenogastropoda
- Order: Neogastropoda
- Superfamily: Conoidea
- Family: Conidae
- Genus: Conus
- Species: C. wallangra

Binomial name
- Conus wallangra (Garrard, 1961)

Synonyms
- Conus (Plicaustraconus) wallangra (Garrard, 1961) · accepted, alternate representation; Floraconus wallangra Garrard, 1961; Plicaustraconus wallangra (Garrard, 1961)

= Conus wallangra =

Species of sea snail

Conus wallangra, common name the Wallangra cone, is a species of sea snail, a marine gastropod mollusk in the family Conidae, the cone snails and their allies.

Like all species within the genus Conus, these snails are predatory and venomous. They are capable of stinging humans, warranting handling caution.

== Description ==
The size of the shell varies between 25 mm and 50 mm.

== Distribution ==
This marine species is endemic to Australia and occurs off New South Wales and Queensland.
