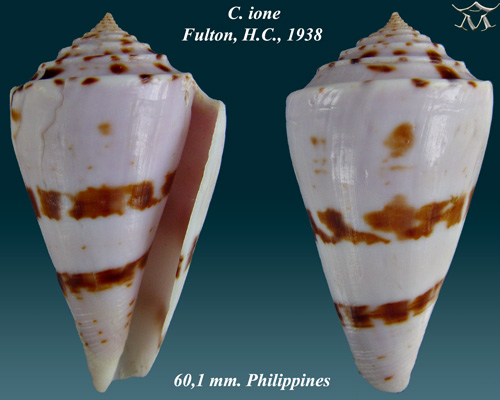
- Apertural and abapertural views of shell of Conasprella ione (Fulton, H.C., 1938)
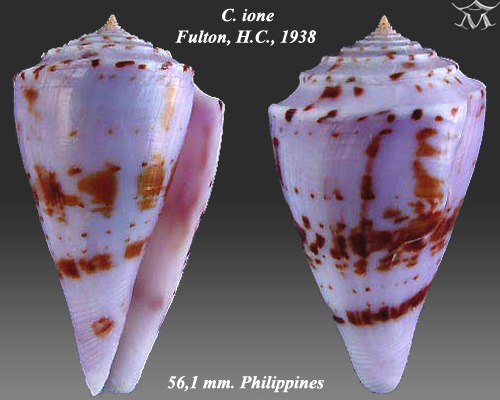

Conservation status
- Least Concern (IUCN 3.1)

Scientific classification
- Kingdom: Animalia
- Phylum: Mollusca
- Class: Gastropoda
- Subclass: Caenogastropoda
- Order: Neogastropoda
- Superfamily: Conoidea
- Family: Conidae
- Genus: Conasprella
- Species: C. ione

Binomial name
- Conasprella ione (Fulton, 1938)

Synonyms
- Conasprella (Endemoconus) ione (Fulton, 1938) · accepted, alternate representation; Conus ione, 1938 Fulton, 1938 (basionym); Endemoconus ione (Fulton, 1938); Yedoconus ione(Fulton, 1938)

= Conasprella ione =

Species of gastropod

Conasprella ione, common name the ione cone, is a species of sea snail, a marine gastropod mollusk in the family Conidae, the cone snails and their allies.

Like all species within the genus Conasprella, these cone snails are predatory and venomous. They are capable of stinging humans, therefore live ones should be handled carefully or not at all.

== Description ==
The size of the shell varies between 40 mm and 76 mm.

== Distribution ==
This marine species occurs off Mozambique, Réunion, the Loyalty Islands, the Philippines, in the South China Sea; off Taiwan, Japan, New Caledonia and Western Australia.
