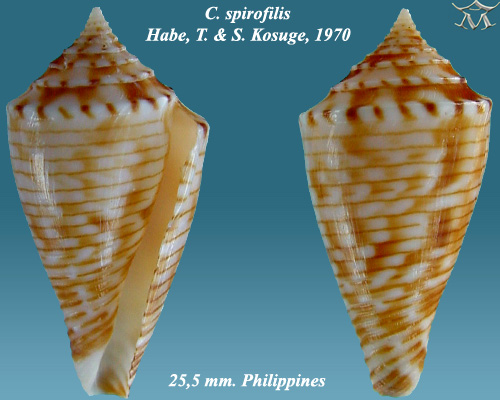
- Apertural and abapertural views of shell of Conasprella spirofilis (Habe, T. & S. Kosuge, 1970)
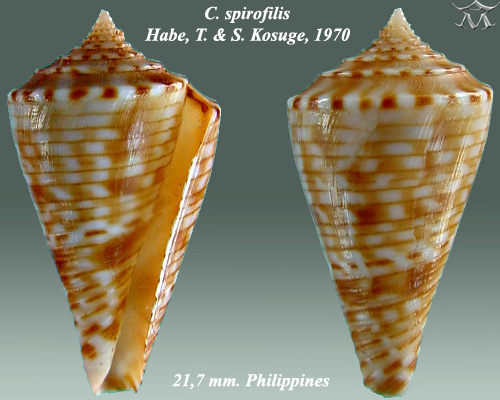

Conservation status
- Least Concern (IUCN 3.1)

Scientific classification
- Kingdom: Animalia
- Phylum: Mollusca
- Class: Gastropoda
- Subclass: Caenogastropoda
- Order: Neogastropoda
- Superfamily: Conoidea
- Family: Conidae
- Genus: Conasprella
- Species: C. spirofilis

Binomial name
- Conasprella spirofilis (Habe & Kosuge, 1970)

Synonyms
- Conasprella (Endemoconus) spirofilis (Habe & Kosuge, 1970) · accepted, alternate representation; Conus japonicus Hwass in Bruguière, 1792; Conus nipponicus da Motta, 1985; Conus spirofilis Habe & Kosuge, 1970 (original combination); Endemoconus spirofilis (Habe & Kosuge, 1970); Yeddoconus spirofilis (Habe & Kosuge, 1970)

= Conasprella spirofilis =

Species of gastropod

Conasprella spirofilis is a species of sea snail, a marine gastropod mollusk in the family Conidae, the cone snails and their allies.

Like all species within the genus Conasprella, these cone snails are predatory and venomous. They are capable of stinging humans, therefore live ones should be handled carefully or not at all.

== Description ==
The size of the shell varies between 19 mm and 37 mm.

== Distribution ==
This marine species occurs off the Philippines and Japan.
