= Conus baeri =

Conservation status
- Least Concern (IUCN 3.1)

Scientific classification
- Kingdom: Animalia
- Phylum: Mollusca
- Class: Gastropoda
- Subclass: Caenogastropoda
- Order: Neogastropoda
- Superfamily: Conoidea
- Family: Conidae
- Genus: Conus
- Species: C. baeri

Binomial name
- Conus baeri Röckel & Korn, 1992

Synonyms
- Asprella baeri (Röckel & Korn, 1992); Conus (Dauciconus) baeri Röckel & Korn, 1992· accepted, alternate representation; Plicaustraconus baeri (Röckel & Korn, 1992)

Species of sea snail

Conus baeri, also known as Floraconus baeri, is a species of sea snail, a marine gastropod mollusk in the family Conidae, the cone snails and their allies.

== Description ==
=== Exterior Shell and Structure ===
The size of the shell varies between 26-55mm. C. baeri (as Asprella baeri) is described originally in Acta Conchyliorum as,

"Moderately small to medium-sized, moderately solid. Last whorl usually conical to ventricosely conical; outline convex adapically, straight toward base; left side may be concave above base. Shoulder angulate. Spire of low to moderate height, outline almost straight to slightly concave. Larval shell of 2-2.25 whorls, maximum diameter 1.2-1.3 mm. Teleoconch sutural ramps nearly flat, with 2 increasing to 3-5 spiral grooves. Last whorl with distinct spiral grooves from base to centre or shoulder and ribbons between. Ground colour white to pale orange. Last whorl usually with a light orangish brown spiral band above and below centre, occasionally with an additional smaller band below shoulder. 10-15 spiral rows of reddish brown spots or bars extending from base to shoulder, sometimes fusing into irregular axial markings. Larval whorls white. Postnuclear sutural ramps with yellowish to reddish brown radial lines or streaks. Aperture brownish cream to pale orange."

=== Live Snail ===
All Conus species are venomous, producing toxins known as conotoxins that are stored in a venom gland. Cone snails have a proboscis that is utilized for multiple purposes, including breeding, sensing environmental factors, and injecting venom into prey.

== Distribution and Habitat ==
This species occurs in the Indian Ocean off Southern Mozambique. A subspecies, F. baeri desuntnotae (see Subspecies section) occurs off the coast of South Africa. C. baeri is a marine benthic snail that lives in deep waters, with specimens found at about 450 meters.

== Behavior ==
Conus snails are primarily nocturnal.

=== Diet ===
C. baeri is a carnivorous predator that utilizes conotoxins to attack prey. Species in the Conus genus consume fish, other mollusks, and marine worms.

=== Locomotion ===
C. baeri moves by mucus mediated gliding.

=== Reproduction ===
C. baeri reproduces sexually.

== Subspecies ==
Two subspecies of C. baeri are described, the original Conus baeri baeri, and a new subspecies, Floraconus baeri desuntnotae. The latter is described in The Nautilus in 2022 as having a markedly smaller shell (noted as 32.5-35mm) than C. baeri baeri with visible differences in shell morphology. F. baeri desuntnotae lacks the orange-brown banding as well as the dark brown lines that are seen on C. baeri baeri. This subspecies also differs in that it lacks the distinctive spiral grooves on the upper part of the whorl of the shell, which are consistently seen in C. baeri baeri. F. baeri desuntnotae is a whitish snail with sand colored markings described as "flames" across the entirety of the outer shell. F. baeri desuntnotae is noted to be found in dredged samples off the coast of Richards Bay, South Africa. This location is further south than samples of C. baeri baeri are typically found.

== Human Relations ==
Cone snail shells have historically been collected, sold, and traded by humans. Beginning in the early 21st century, the pharmacological potential of conotoxins as an analgesic has been studied by medical researchers.
