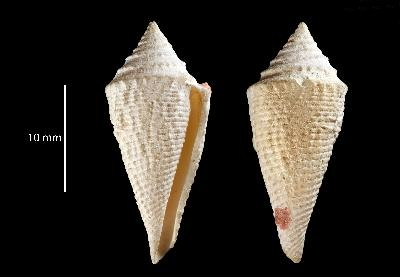
- Shell of Conasprella howelli (specimen at MNHN, Paris)

Scientific classification
- Kingdom: Animalia
- Phylum: Mollusca
- Class: Gastropoda
- Subclass: Caenogastropoda
- Order: Neogastropoda
- Superfamily: Conoidea
- Family: Conidae
- Genus: Conasprella
- Species: C. howelli

Binomial name
- Conasprella howelli (Iredale, 1929)

Synonyms
- Conasprella (Endemoconus) howelli (Iredale, 1929) · accepted, alternate representation; Conus howelli Iredale, 1929 (original combination); Endemoconus howelli (Iredale, 1929)

= Conasprella howelli =

Species of gastropod

Conasprella howelli is a species of sea snail, a marine gastropod mollusk in the family Conidae, the cone snails and their allies.

Like all species within the genus Conasprella, these cone snails are predatory and venomous. They are capable of stinging, therefore live ones should be handled carefully or not at all.

== Description ==
The size of the shell varies between 18 and 49 mm (0.71 and 1.93 in).

== Distribution ==
This marine species occurs off New Zealand, New Caledonia and New South Wales, Australia at depths between 50 m and 290 m.
