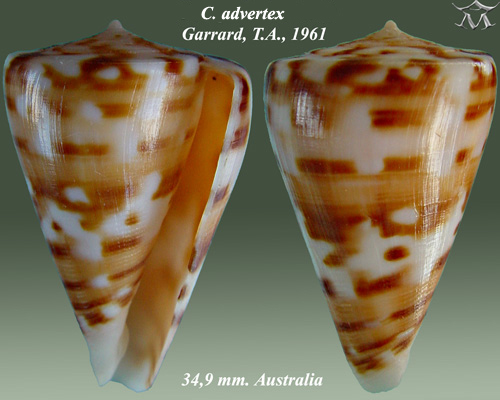
- Apertural and abapertural views of shell of Conus advertex Garrard, T.A., 1961
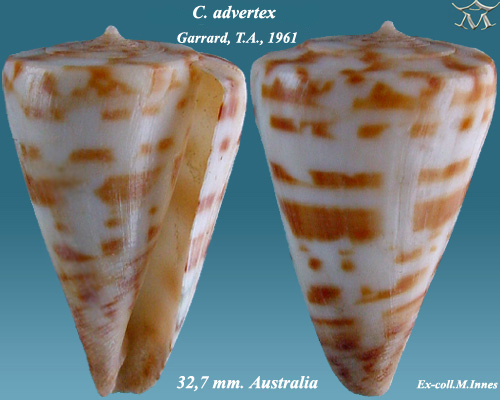

Scientific classification
- Kingdom: Animalia
- Phylum: Mollusca
- Class: Gastropoda
- Subclass: Caenogastropoda
- Order: Neogastropoda
- Superfamily: Conoidea
- Family: Conidae
- Genus: Conus
- Species: C. advertex

Binomial name
- Conus advertex (Garrard, 1961)

Synonyms
- Conus (Plicaustraconus) advertex (Garrard, 1961) accepted, alternate representation; Plicaustraconus advertex (Garrard, 1961); Rhizoconus advertex Garrard, 1961 (original description)

= Conus advertex =

Species of sea snail

Conus advertex is a species of sea snail, a marine gastropod mollusk in the family Conidae, the cone snails, cone shells or cones.

These snails are predatory and venomous. They are capable of stinging humans, therefore live ones should be handled carefully or not at all.

== Description ==
The size of the shell varies between 27 mm and 46 mm.

== Distribution ==
This marine species of cone snail is endemic to Australia (New South Wales, Queensland).
