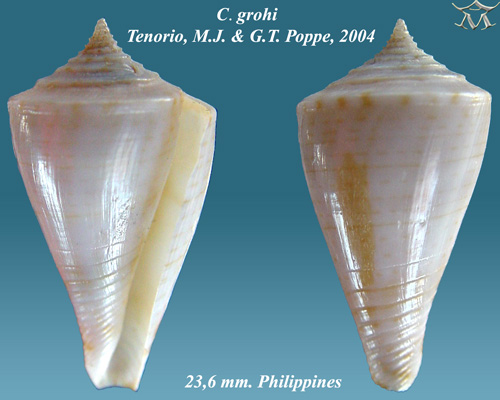
- Apertural and abapertural views of shell of Conasprella grohi (Tenorio, M.J. & G.T. Poppe, 2004)

Scientific classification
- Kingdom: Animalia
- Phylum: Mollusca
- Class: Gastropoda
- Subclass: Caenogastropoda
- Order: Neogastropoda
- Superfamily: Conoidea
- Family: Conidae
- Genus: Conasprella
- Species: C. grohi

Binomial name
- Conasprella grohi (Tenorio & Poppe, 2004)

Synonyms
- Conasprella (Endemoconus) grohi (Tenorio & Poppe, 2004) · accepted, alternate representation; Conus grohi Tenorio & Poppe, 2004 (original combination); Endemoconus grohi (Tenorio & Poppe, 2004); Yeddoconus grohi (Tenorio & Poppe, 2004)

= Conasprella grohi =

Species of gastropod

Conasprella grohi is a species of sea snail, a marine gastropod mollusk in the family Conidae, the cone snails and their allies.

Like all species within the genus Conasprella, these snails are predatory and venomous. They are capable of stinging humans, therefore live ones should be handled carefully or not at all.

== Description ==
The size of the shell varies between 20 mm and 27 mm.

== Distribution ==
This marine species occurs off the Philippines.

== Gallery ==
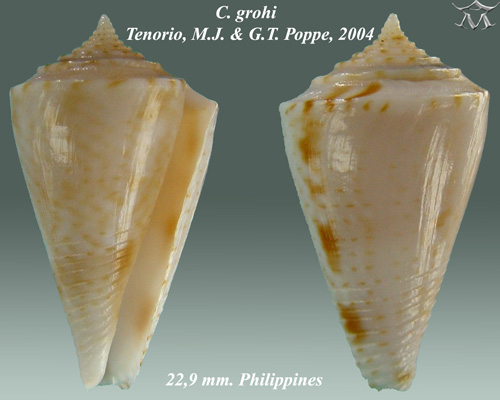
Conasprella grohi Tenorio, M.J. & G.T. Poppe, 2004
