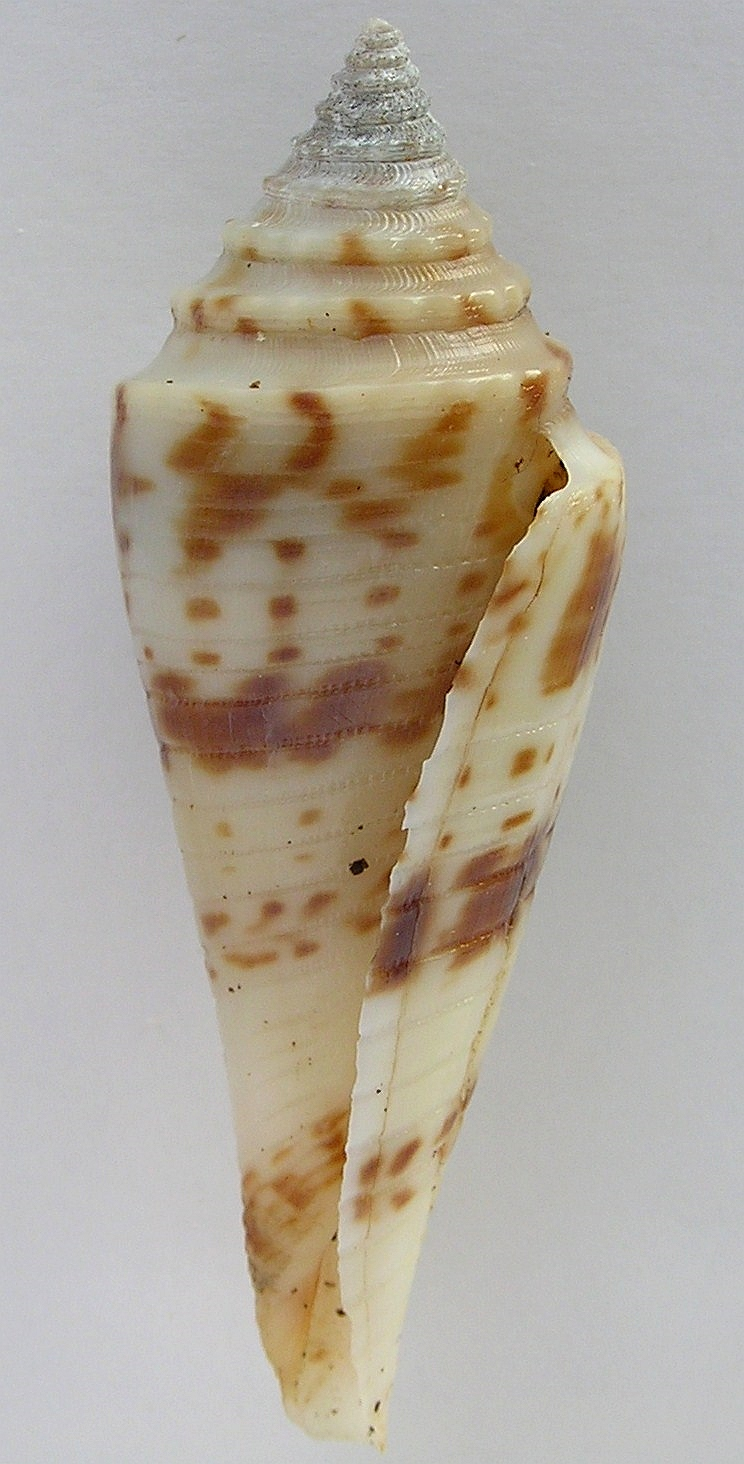
- Shell of Conasprella ichinoseana

Scientific classification
- Kingdom: Animalia
- Phylum: Mollusca
- Class: Gastropoda
- Subclass: Caenogastropoda
- Order: Neogastropoda
- Superfamily: Conoidea
- Family: Conidae
- Genus: Conasprella
- Species: C. ichinoseana

Binomial name
- Conasprella ichinoseana (Kuroda, 1956)

Synonyms
- Asprella ichinoseana Kuroda, 1956; Asprella ichinoseana prioris Kuroda, 1956; Conasprella (Fusiconus) ichinoseana (Kuroda, 1956) · accepted, alternate representation; Conus ichinoseanus (Kuroda, 1956); Endemoconus ichinoseanus (Kuroda, 1956); Yeddoconus ichinoseanus (Kuroda, 1956)

= Conasprella ichinoseana =

Species of gastropod

Conasprella ichinoseana is a species of sea snail, a marine gastropod mollusk in the family Conidae, the cone snails and their allies.

Like all species within the genus Conasprella, these cone snails are predatory and venomous. They are capable of stinging humans.

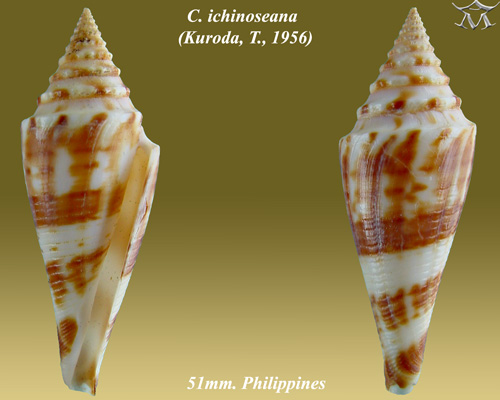
Conasprella ichinoseana (Kuroda, T., 1956)

== Description ==
The size of an adult shell varies between 50 mm and 105 mm.

== Distribution ==
This species occurs in the Pacific Ocean from the Philippines to Japan, off Northwest Australia and Vanuatu, the Solomon Islands, New Caledonia; in the South China Sea off Vietnam.
