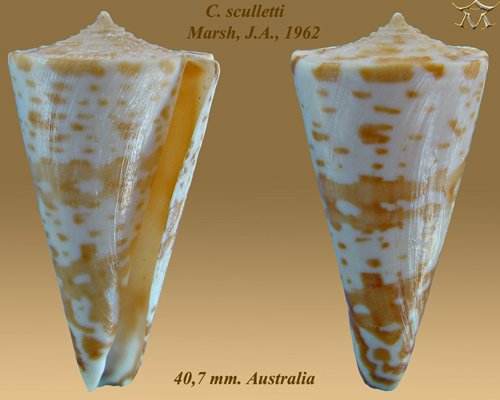
- Apertural and abapertural views of the shell of Conus sculletti Marsh, J.A., 1962
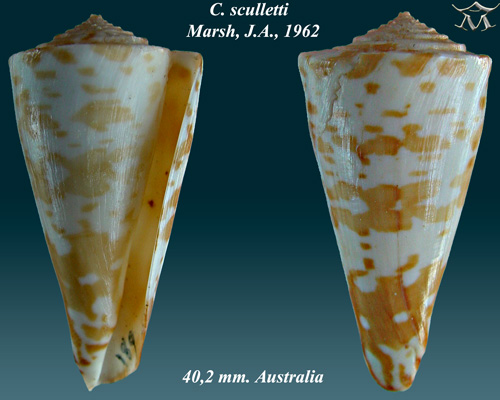

Scientific classification
- Kingdom: Animalia
- Phylum: Mollusca
- Class: Gastropoda
- Subclass: Caenogastropoda
- Order: Neogastropoda
- Superfamily: Conoidea
- Family: Conidae
- Genus: Conus
- Species: C. sculletti

Binomial name
- Conus sculletti Marsh, 1962

Synonyms
- Conus (Papyriconus) sculletti Marsh, 1962 · accepted, alternate representation; Endemoconus sculletti (Marsh, 1962); Papyriconus sculletti (Marsh, 1962)

= Conus sculletti =

Species of sea snail

Conus sculletti, common name Scullett's cone, is a species of sea snail, a marine gastropod mollusk in the family Conidae, the cone snails and their allies.

Like all species within the genus Conus, these snails are predatory and venomous. They are capable of stinging humans; therefore, live ones should be handled carefully or not at all.

== Description ==
The shell's shape is elongated with concave sides, a sharply angled shoulder, and a flat to low spire. The size of the shell varies between 30 mm and 50 mm. The shells consist of a white background with orange-brown patches, typically arranged in distinct bands.

== Distribution ==
This marine species is endemic to Australia and occurs off New South Wales and Queensland.
