= Conus felix =

Scientific classification
- Kingdom: Animalia
- Phylum: Mollusca
- Class: Gastropoda
- Subclass: Caenogastropoda
- Order: Neogastropoda
- Superfamily: Conoidea
- Family: Conidae
- Genus: Conus
- Species: C. felix

Binomial name
- Conus felix Fenzan, 2012

Synonyms
- Conus (Plicaustraconus) felix Fenzan, 2012 · accepted, alternate representation; Plicaustraconus felix (Fenzan, 2012)

Species of sea snail

Conus felix is a species of sea snail, a marine gastropod mollusc in the family Conidae, the cone snails, cone shells or cones.

These snails are predatory and venomous. They are capable of stinging humans.

== Description ==
The size of the shell varies between 25 mm and 35 mm.

== Distribution ==
This marine species of cone snail occurs in the Indian Ocean off KwaZulu-Natal, South Africa.
