= Conasprella boucheti =

Conservation status
- Least Concern (IUCN 3.1)

Scientific classification
- Kingdom: Animalia
- Phylum: Mollusca
- Class: Gastropoda
- Subclass: Caenogastropoda
- Order: Neogastropoda
- Superfamily: Conoidea
- Family: Conidae
- Genus: Conasprella
- Species: C. boucheti

Binomial name
- Conasprella boucheti (Richard, 1983)

Synonyms
- Conasprella (Conasprella) boucheti (Richard, 1983) · accepted, alternate representation; Conus boucheti Richard, 1983 (original combination); Endemoconus boucheti (Richard, 1983); Yeddoconus boucheti (Richard, 1983)

Species of gastropod

Conasprella boucheti is a species of sea snail, a marine gastropod mollusk in the family Conidae, the cone snails and their allies.

Like all species within the genus Conasprella, these snails are predatory and venomous. They are capable of stinging humans, therefore live ones should be handled carefully or not at all.

== Description ==
The shell of Conasprella boucheti varies in size between 14 mm and 39 mm. The shell is characterized by its conical shape and intricate patterns. The coloration of the shell typically features a combination of light and dark hues, which provide camouflage against the seabed. The surface of the shell is adorned with fine spiral ridges and grooves, adding to its intricate appearance. The aperture is narrow, and the outer lip is thin and slightly flared.

== Distribution ==
This marine species occurs off New Caledonia.
