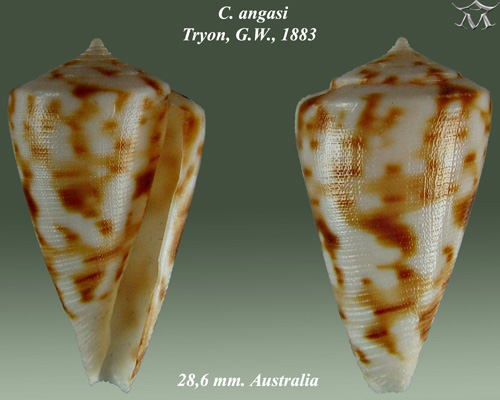
- Apertural and abapertural views of shell of Conus angasi Tryon, G.W., 1883
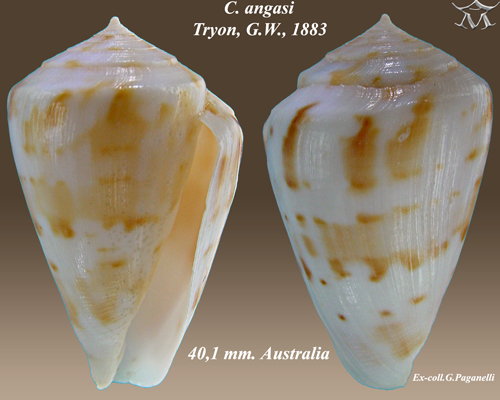

Conservation status
- Least Concern (IUCN 3.1)

Scientific classification
- Kingdom: Animalia
- Phylum: Mollusca
- Class: Gastropoda
- Subclass: Caenogastropoda
- Order: Neogastropoda
- Superfamily: Conoidea
- Family: Conidae
- Genus: Conus
- Species: C. angasi

Binomial name
- Conus angasi Tryon, 1884

Synonyms
- Conus metcalfei Angas, 1877 (junior homonym of Conus metcalfii Reeve, 1843); Conus (Plicaustraconus) metcalfei Tryon, 1884 accepted, alternate representation; Plicaustraconus angasi (Tryon, 1884)

= Conus angasi =

Species of sea snail

Conus angasi, common name Angas's cone, is a species of sea snail, a marine gastropod mollusk in the family Conidae, the cone snails and their allies.

Like all species within the genus Conus, these snails are predatory and venomous. They are capable of stinging humans, therefore live ones should be handled carefully or not at all.

== Description ==
The size of the shell varies between 20 mm and 51 mm.

== Distribution ==
This marine species is endemic to Australia and occurs off New South Wales and Queensland.
