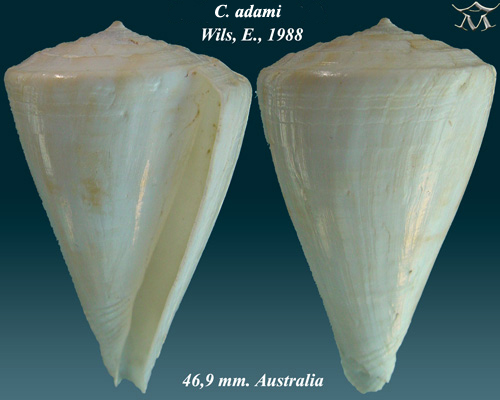
- Apertural and abapertural views of shell of Conus adami Wils, E., 1988

Scientific classification
- Kingdom: Animalia
- Phylum: Mollusca
- Class: Gastropoda
- Subclass: Caenogastropoda
- Order: Neogastropoda
- Superfamily: Conoidea
- Family: Conidae
- Genus: Conus
- Species: C. adami

Binomial name
- Conus adami Wils, 1988

Synonyms
- Conus trigonus adami Wils, 1988; Conus (Plicaustraconus) adami Wils, 1988 accepted, alternate representation

= Conus adami =

Species of sea snail

Conus adami is a species of sea snail, a marine gastropod mollusk in the family Conidae, the cone snails, cone shells or cones.

These snails are predatory and venomous. They are capable of stinging humans.

== Notes ==
Additional information regarding this species:

- Taxonomy: Conus adami is often treated as a subspecies or synonym of C. trigonus. The latter is a shallow-water species occurring in NW Australia, whereas adami is an offshore species occurring off Northern Australia. The two overlap in the Darwin area, and there are specimens that appear to be intermediate. For conservation implications, the two are here listed as distinct.

== Description ==
The size of the shell varies between 29 mm and 80 mm.

== Distribution ==
This species of cone snail is endemic to Australia and occurs in the Arafura Sea and in the Gulf of Carpentaria.
