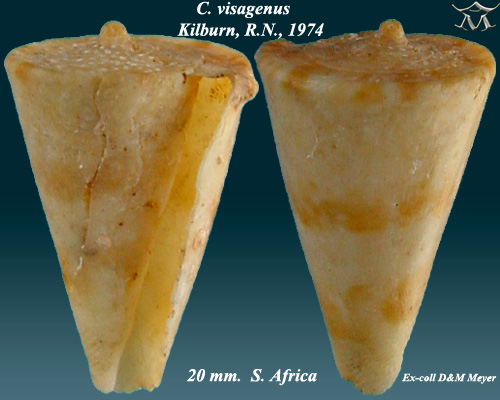
- Apertural and abapertural views of shell of Conus visagenus Kilburn, R.N., 1974

Conservation status
- Least Concern (IUCN 3.1)

Scientific classification
- Kingdom: Animalia
- Phylum: Mollusca
- Class: Gastropoda
- Subclass: Caenogastropoda
- Order: Neogastropoda
- Superfamily: Conoidea
- Family: Conidae
- Genus: Conus
- Species: C. visagenus

Binomial name
- Conus visagenus Kilburn, 1974

Synonyms
- Conus (Plicaustraconus) visagenus Kilburn, 1974 · accepted, alternate representation; Plicaustraconus visagenus (Kilburn, 1974)

= Conus visagenus =

Species of sea snail

Conus visagenus, common name the Lemonsnap cone, is a species of sea snail, a marine gastropod mollusk in the family Conidae, the cone snails and their allies.

Like all species within the genus Conus, these snails are predatory and venomous. They are capable of stinging humans, therefore live ones should be handled carefully or not at all.

== Description ==
The size of the shell varies between 17 mm and 32 mm.

== Distribution ==
This marine species occurs off South Africa.
