= Conasprella raoulensis =

Scientific classification
- Kingdom: Animalia
- Phylum: Mollusca
- Class: Gastropoda
- Subclass: Caenogastropoda
- Order: Neogastropoda
- Superfamily: Conoidea
- Family: Conidae
- Genus: Conasprella
- Species: C. raoulensis

Binomial name
- Conasprella raoulensis (Powell, 1958)

Synonyms
- Conasprella (Endemoconus) raoulensis (Powell, 1958) · accepted, alternate representation; Conus raoulensis Powell, 1958 (original combination); Endemoconus raoulensis (Powell, 1958)

Species of gastropod

Conasprella raoulensis is a species of sea snail, a marine gastropod mollusk in the family Conidae, the cone snails and their allies.

Like all species within the genus Conasprella, these cone snails are predatory and venomous. They are capable of stinging humans, therefore live ones should be handled carefully or not at all.

== Description ==
The size of the shell varies between 16 mm and 22 mm.

== Distribution ==
This marine species is endemic to New Zealand, occurring off Norfolk Island and the Kermadec Islands.
