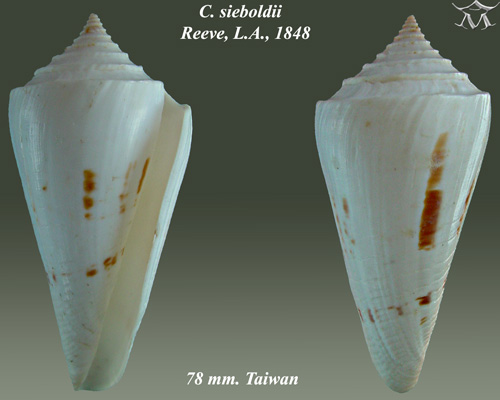
- Apertural and abapertural views of shell of Conasprella sieboldii (Reeve, L.A., 1848)

Scientific classification
- Kingdom: Animalia
- Phylum: Mollusca
- Class: Gastropoda
- Subclass: Caenogastropoda
- Order: Neogastropoda
- Superfamily: Conoidea
- Family: Conidae
- Genus: Conasprella
- Species: C. sieboldii

Binomial name
- Conasprella sieboldii (Reeve, 1848)

Synonyms
- Conasprella (Endemoconus) sieboldii (Reeve, 1848) · accepted, alternate representation; Conus petricosus Azuma, 1961; Conus rarimaculatus G. B. Sowerby II, 1870; Conus sieboldii Reeve, 1848 (original combination); Conus sieboldii petricosus (f) ^{Azuma, M., 1961}; Endemoconus sieboldii (Reeve, 1848); Yeddoconus sieboldii (Reeve, 1848)

= Conasprella sieboldii =

Species of gastropod

Conasprella sieboldii, common name Siebold's cone, is a species of sea snail, a marine gastropod mollusk in the family Conidae, the cone snails and their allies.

Like all species within the genus Conasprella, these cone snails are predatory and venomous. They are capable of stinging humans, therefore live ones should be handled carefully or not at all.

== Description ==
The length of the shell varies between 51 mm and 129 mm.

== Distribution ==
This marine species occurs off Japan and Taiwan.
