= Conus lozeti =

Scientific classification
- Kingdom: Animalia
- Phylum: Mollusca
- Class: Gastropoda
- Subclass: Caenogastropoda
- Order: Neogastropoda
- Superfamily: Conoidea
- Family: Conidae
- Genus: Conus
- Species: C. lozeti

Binomial name
- Conus lozeti Richard, 1980

Synonyms
- Conus (Plicaustraconus) lozeti Richard, 1980 · accepted, alternate representation; Endemoconus lozeti (Richard, 1980); Malagasyconus lozeti (Richard, 1980); Plicaustraconus lozeti (Richard, 1980)

Species of sea snail

Conus lozeti is a species of sea snail, a marine gastropod mollusk in the family Conidae, the cone snails and their allies.

Like all species within the genus Conus, these snails are predatory and venomous. They are capable of stinging humans, therefore live ones should be handled carefully or not at all.

== Description ==
The size of the shell varies between 50 mm and 65 mm.

== Distribution ==
This marine species occurs off Madagascar.
