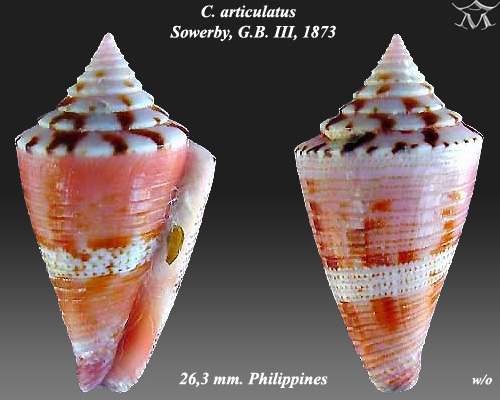
- Apertural and abapertural views of shell of Conasprella articulata (Sowerby, G.B. II, 1873)
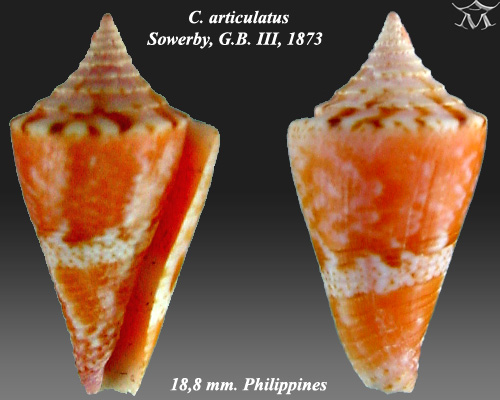

Conservation status
- Least Concern (IUCN 3.1)

Scientific classification
- Kingdom: Animalia
- Phylum: Mollusca
- Class: Gastropoda
- Subclass: Caenogastropoda
- Order: Neogastropoda
- Superfamily: Conoidea
- Family: Conidae
- Genus: Conasprella
- Species: C. articulata

Binomial name
- Conasprella articulata (G. B. Sowerby II, 1873)

Synonyms
- Conasprella (Conasprella) articulata (G. B. Sowerby II, 1873) · accepted, alternate representation; Conus articulatus G. B. Sowerby II, 1873 (original combination); Conus lombei G. B. Sowerby III, 1881; Conus semisulcatus G. B. Sowerby II, 1870; Conus tosaensis Shikama, 1970; Conus (Pionoconus) tosaensis Shikama, T. 1970; Endemoconus nadaensis Azuma & Toki, 1970; Parviconus nadaensis Azuma, M. & Toki, R. 1970

= Conasprella articulata =

Species of gastropod

Conasprella articulata, common name the Nada cone, is a species of sea snail, a marine gastropod mollusk in the family Conidae, the cone snails and their allies.

Like all species within the genus Conasprella, these snails are predatory and venomous. They are capable of stinging humans, therefore live ones should be handled carefully or not at all.

== Description ==
The size of the shell varies between 15 mm and 29 mm. The shell is chestnut-colored, with revolving lines articulated with chocolate and white, a central white band and another below the angle of the spire.

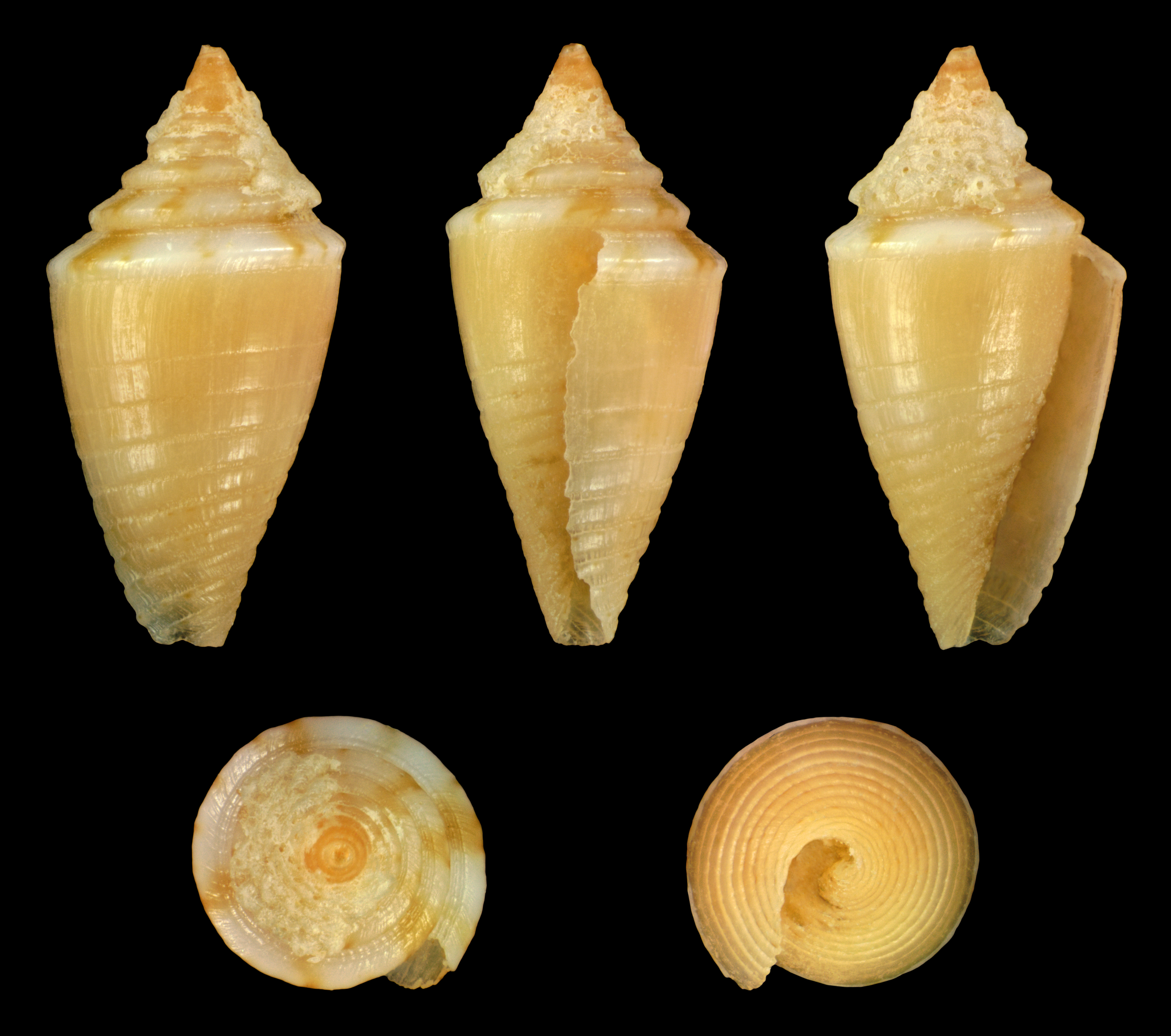
var. lombei, juvenile

== Distribution ==
This species occurs in the Indian Ocean off East Africa and off the Mascarene Basin; also off Indo-China, Indo-Malaysia, New Caledonia and off Queensland, Australia.
