= Conus bonfigliolii =

Conservation status
- Data Deficient (IUCN 3.1)

Scientific classification
- Kingdom: Animalia
- Phylum: Mollusca
- Class: Gastropoda
- Subclass: Caenogastropoda
- Order: Neogastropoda
- Superfamily: Conoidea
- Family: Conidae
- Genus: Conus
- Species: C. bonfigliolii

Binomial name
- Conus bonfigliolii (Bozzetti, 2010)

Synonyms
- Conus (Plicaustraconus) bonfigliolii (Bozzetti, 2010) accepted, alternate representation; Endemoconus bonfigliolii Bozzetti, 2010 (original combination); Malagasyconus bonfigliolii (Bozzetti, 2010); Plicaustraconus bonfigliolii (Bozzetti, 2010)

Species of sea snail

Conus bonfigliolii is a species of sea snail, a marine gastropod mollusc in the family Conidae, the cone snails and their allies.

Like all species within the genus Conus, these cone snails are predatory and venomous. They are capable of stinging humans, therefore live ones should be handled carefully or not at all.

== Description ==
The size of the shell varies between 17 mm and 27 mm.

== Distribution ==
This species occurs in the Indian Ocean off Southern Madagascar.
