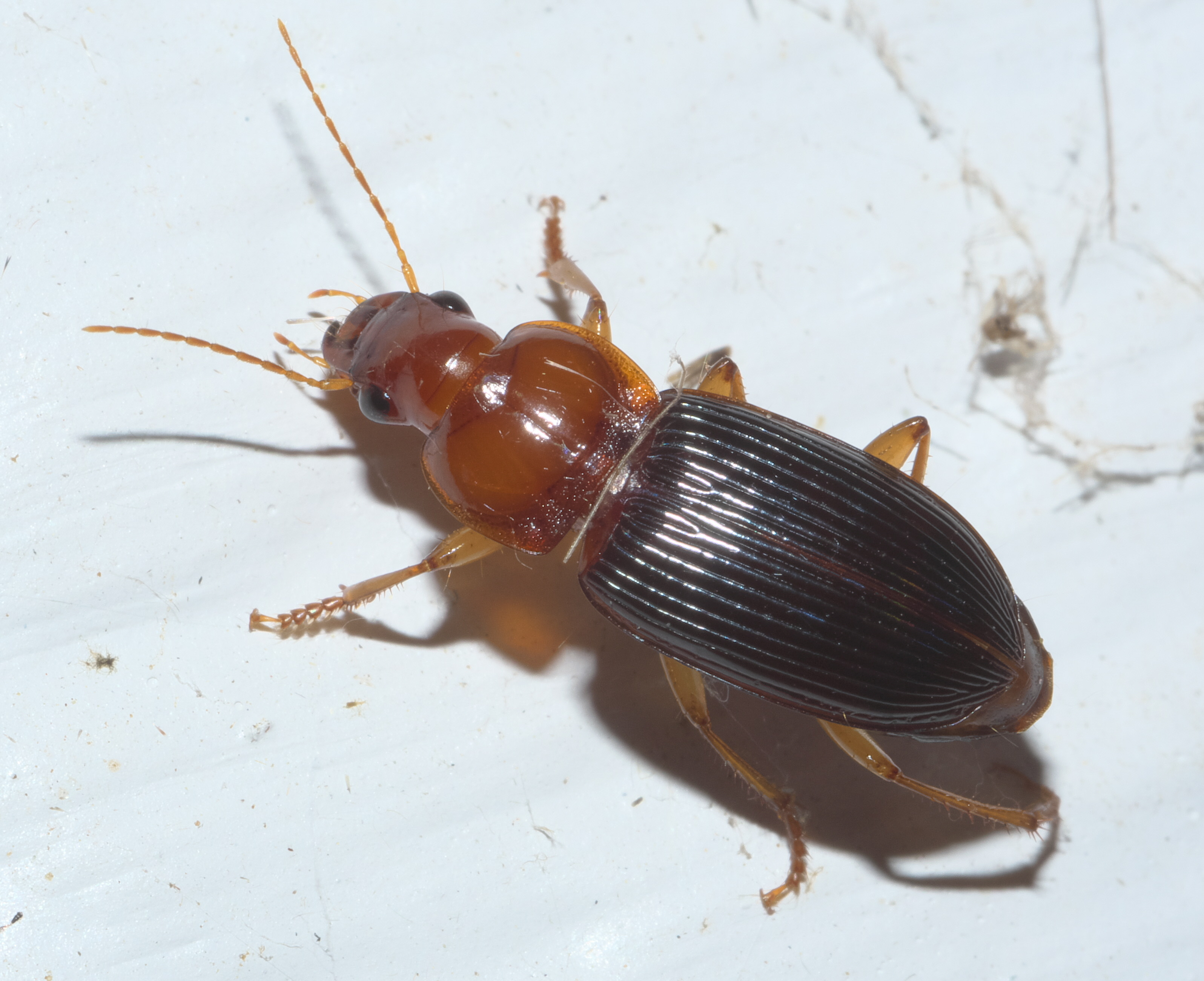
- Notiobia terminata

Scientific classification
- Domain: Eukaryota
- Kingdom: Animalia
- Phylum: Arthropoda
- Class: Insecta
- Order: Coleoptera
- Suborder: Adephaga
- Family: Carabidae
- Subfamily: Harpalinae
- Tribe: Harpalini; Bonelli, 1810

Subtribes
- Amblystomina Fauvel, 1889; Ditomina Bonelli, 1810; Harpalina Bonelli, 1810

= Harpalini =

Tribe of beetles

Harpalini is a tribe of a diverse group of ground beetles belonging to the subfamily Harpalinae within the broader family Carabidae. The tribe contains more than 1,900 species.

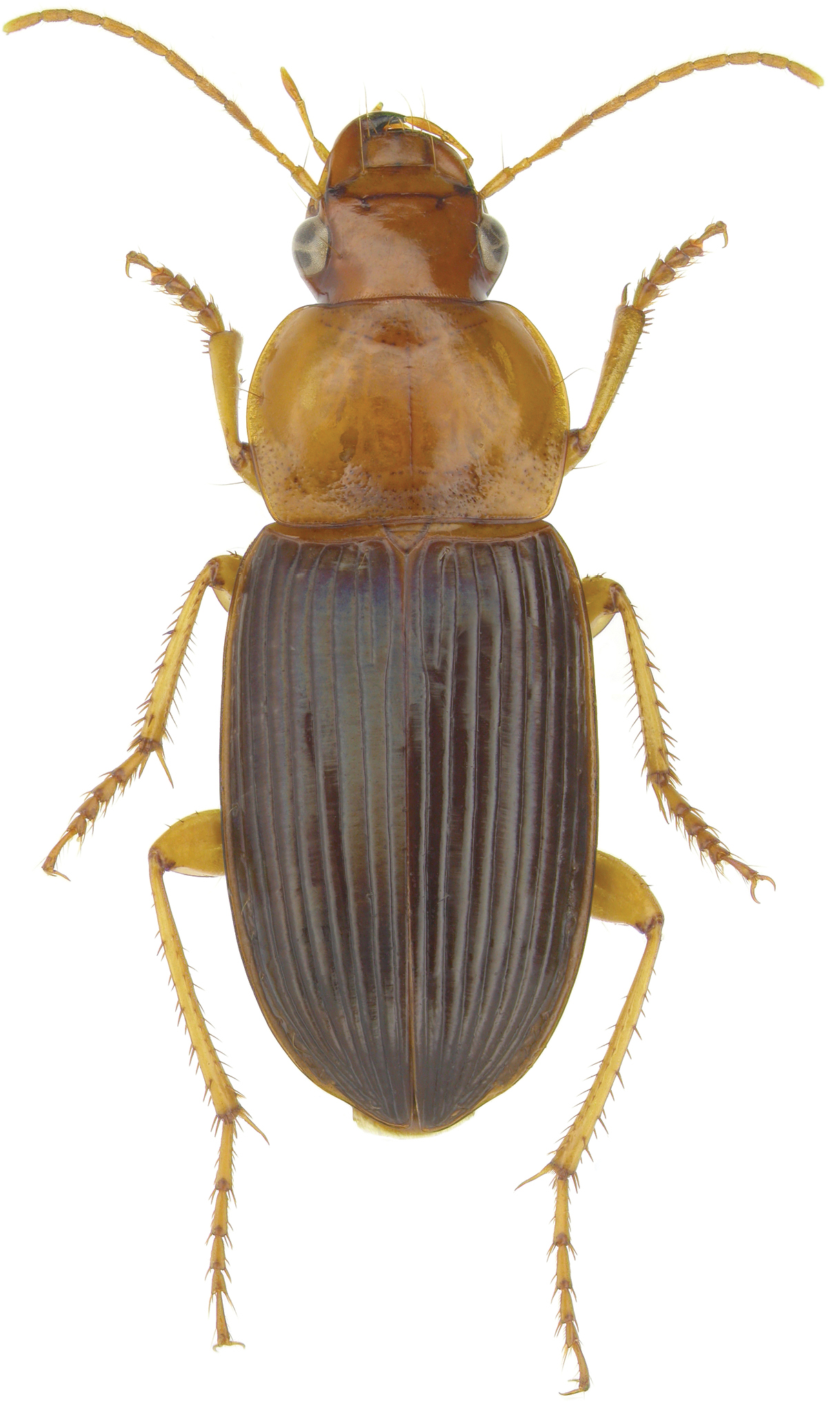
Trichotichnus dichrous

== Genera ==
These 103 genera belong to Harpalini:

Subtribe Amblystomina Fauvel, 1889
Amblystomus Erichson, 1837
Anomostomus LaFerté-Sénectère, 1853
Barysomus Dejean, 1829
Oosoma Nietner, 1857
Subtribe Ditomina Bonelli, 1810
Bronislavia Semenov, 1891
Carenochyrus Solsky, 1874
Carterus Dejean, 1830
Chilotomus Chaudoir, 1842
Ditomus Bonelli, 1810
Dixus Billberg, 1820
Eocarterus Stichel, 1923
Eucarterus Reitter, 1900
Graniger Motschulsky, 1864
Indocarterus Kataev & Wrase, 2018
Liochirus Tschitscherine, 1897
Machozetus Chaudoir, 1850
Odotoncarus Solier, 1835
Oedesis Motschulsky, 1850
Pachycarus Solier, 1835
Parapenthus Kataev & Wrase, 2018
Penthus Chaudoir, 1843
Phorticosomus Schaum, 1863
Proditomus Schauberger, 1934
Pseudaristus Reitter, 1900
Tschitscherinellus Csiki, 1906
Subtribe Harpalina Bonelli, 1810
Acinopus Dejean, 1821
Afromizonus Basilewsky, 1947
Allosiopelus N.Ito, 1995
Amblygnathus Dejean, 1829
Anisocnemus Chaudoir, 1843
Athrostictus Bates, 1878
Axinotoma Dejean, 1829
Aztecarpalus Ball, 1970
Bleusea Bedel, 1897
Boeomimetes Péringuey, 1896
Bradybaenus Dejean, 1829
Coleolissus Bates, 1892
Cratacanthus Dejean, 1829
Cratognathus Dejean, 1829
Daptus Fischer von Waldheim, 1823
Dioryche W.S.MacLeay, 1825
Discoderus LeConte, 1853
Dregus Motschulsky, 1864
Ectinothorax Alluaud, 1941
Eriophonus Tschitscherine, 1901
Euryderus LeConte, 1846
Geodromus Dejean, 1829
Harpalinus Jeannel, 1946
Harpaliscus Bates, 1892
Harpalobrachys Tschitscherine, 1899
Harpalodiodes Bousquet, 2002
Harpalomimus Facchini & Giachino, 2020
Harpalomorphus Péringuey, 1896
Harpalus Latreille, 1802
Harpathaumas Basilewsky, 1947
Harponixus Basilewsky, 1950
Hartonymus Casey, 1914
Heteracantha Brullé, 1835
Hyphaereon W.S.MacLeay, 1825
Indiophonus N.Ito, 1996
Kareya Andrewes, 1919
Lampetes Andrewes, 1940
Laparhetes Jeannel, 1946
Liodaptus Bates, 1889
Meroctenus Gemminger & Harold, 1868
Microderes Faldermann, 1836
Neoaulacoryssus Noonan, 1985
Neodiachipteryx Noonan, 1985
Neohyparpalus Clarke, 1981
Neophygas Noonan, 1976
Nesacinopus Tschitscherine, 1900
Nesarpalus Bedel, 1897
Nipponoharpalus Habu, 1973
Nothodaptus Maindron, 1906
Oesyperus Andrewes, 1923
Omostropus Péringuey, 1896
Ooidius Chaudoir, 1847
Ophoniscus Bates, 1892
Ophonus Dejean, 1821
Oxycentrus Chaudoir, 1854
Panagrius Andrewes, 1933
Pangus Dejean, 1821
Parasiopelus Basilewsky, 1946
Paraulacoryssus Shpeley; Hunting & Ball, 2017
Parophonus Ganglbauer, 1891
Paulianoscirtus Basilewsky, 1976
Penthophonus Reitter, 1900
Piosoma LeConte, 1847
Platymetopsis Ball & Maddison, 1987
Platymetopus Dejean, 1829
Prakasha Andrewes, 1919
Pseudodiachipteryx Burgeon, 1936
Pseudohyparpalus Basilewsky, 1946
Pseudoselenophorus Péringuey, 1896
Selenophorus Dejean, 1829
Selenotichnus Kataev, 1999
Siopelophonus Kataev, 2015
Siopelus Murray, 1859
Stenomorphus Dejean, 1831
Trichopselaphus Chaudoir, 1843
Trichotichnus A.Morawitz, 1863
Trichoxycentrus N.Ito, 2000
Typsiharpalus Tschitscherine, 1901
