= Harpalus agnatus =

Scientific classification
- Kingdom: Animalia
- Phylum: Arthropoda
- Class: Insecta
- Order: Coleoptera
- Suborder: Adephaga
- Superfamily: Caraboidea
- Family: Carabidae
- Subfamily: Harpalinae
- Tribe: Harpalini
- Genus: Harpalus
- Species: H. agnatus

Binomial name
- Harpalus agnatus Reiche, 1850

Synonyms
- Harpalus asphaltinus

Species of beetle

Harpalus agnatus is a species in the beetle family Carabidae, found in eastern Africa.
