= Harpalus karakorum =

Scientific classification
- Kingdom: Animalia
- Phylum: Arthropoda
- Class: Insecta
- Order: Coleoptera
- Suborder: Adephaga
- Superfamily: Caraboidea
- Family: Carabidae
- Subfamily: Harpalinae
- Tribe: Harpalini
- Genus: Harpalus
- Species: H. karakorum

Binomial name
- Harpalus karakorum Jedlicka, 1958

Synonyms
- Harpalus karokorum

Species of beetle

Harpalus karakorum is a species in the beetle family Carabidae. It is found in Pakistan.
