= Harpalus amputatus =

Scientific classification
- Kingdom: Animalia
- Phylum: Arthropoda
- Class: Insecta
- Order: Coleoptera
- Suborder: Adephaga
- Superfamily: Caraboidea
- Family: Carabidae
- Subfamily: Harpalinae
- Tribe: Harpalini
- Genus: Harpalus
- Species: H. amputatus

Binomial name
- Harpalus amputatus Say, 1830

Species of beetle

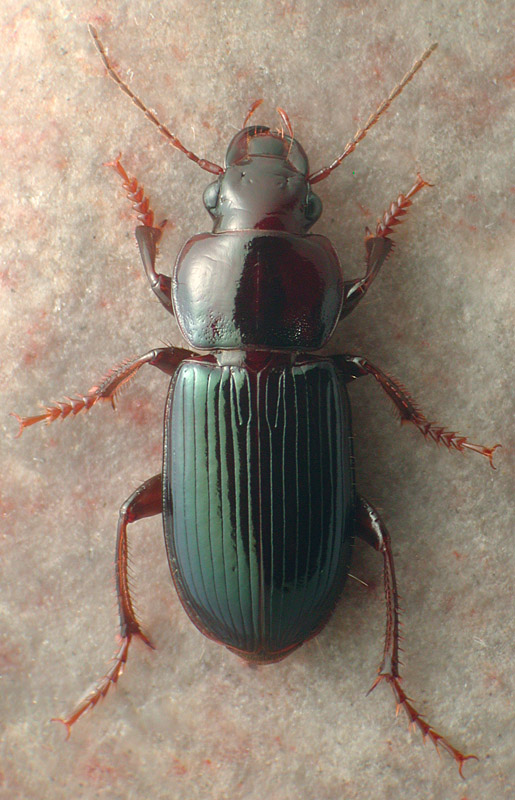
Harpalus amputatus male, in Arizona USA

Harpalus amputatus is a species in the beetle family Carabidae. It is found in China, Russia, and North America.

== Subspecies ==
These four subspecies belong to the species Harpalus amputatus:

- Harpalus amputatus amputatoides Mlynar, 1979 (Russia)
- Harpalus amputatus amputatus Say, 1830 (the United States, Canada, Alaska, and Mexico)
- Harpalus amputatus inschanicus Breit, 1914 (China)
- Harpalus amputatus obtusus (Gebler, 1833) (China, Russia, and Mongolia)
