= Harpalomimus bitinctus =

Scientific classification
- Domain: Eukaryota
- Kingdom: Animalia
- Phylum: Arthropoda
- Class: Insecta
- Order: Coleoptera
- Suborder: Adephaga
- Family: Carabidae
- Subfamily: Harpalinae
- Tribe: Harpalini
- Genus: Harpalomimus
- Species: H. bitinctus

Binomial name
- Harpalomimus bitinctus (Jeannel, 1948)

Species of beetle

Harpalomimus bitinctus is a species of ground beetle in the subfamily Harpalinae. It was described by Jeannel in 1948.
