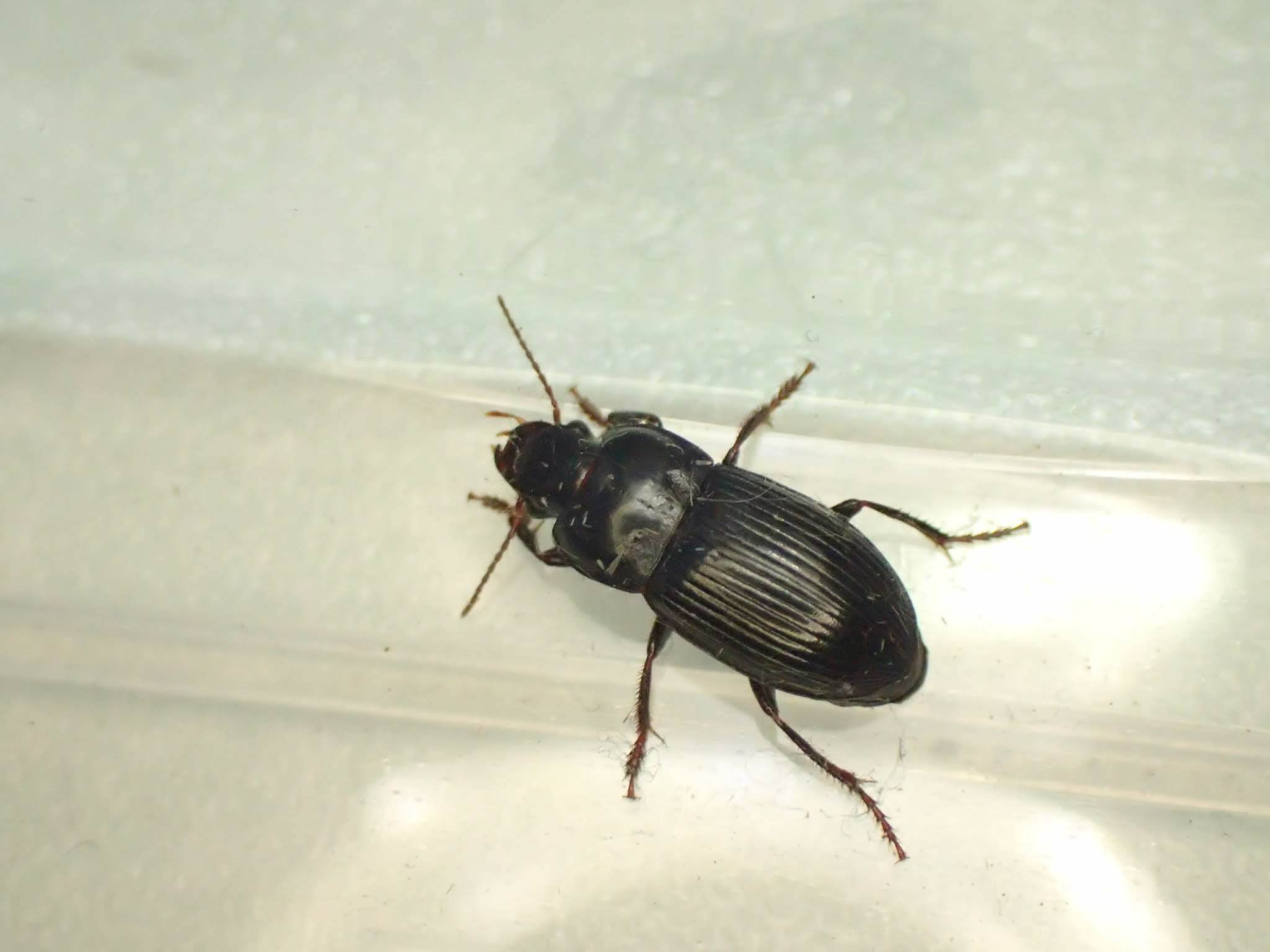
- Nipponoharpalus, Japan

Scientific classification
- Kingdom: Animalia
- Phylum: Arthropoda
- Class: Insecta
- Order: Coleoptera
- Suborder: Adephaga
- Family: Carabidae
- Tribe: Harpalini
- Subtribe: Harpalina
- Genus: Nipponoharpalus; Habu, 1973
- Species: N. discrepans

Binomial name
- Nipponoharpalus discrepans (A.Morawitz, 1862)

= Nipponoharpalus =

Species of beetle

Nipponoharpalus is a genus in the ground beetle family Carabidae. This genus has a single species, Nipponoharpalus discrepans. It is found in Japan, China, Korea, and Russia.

Nippon refers to Japan, where it was discovered.
