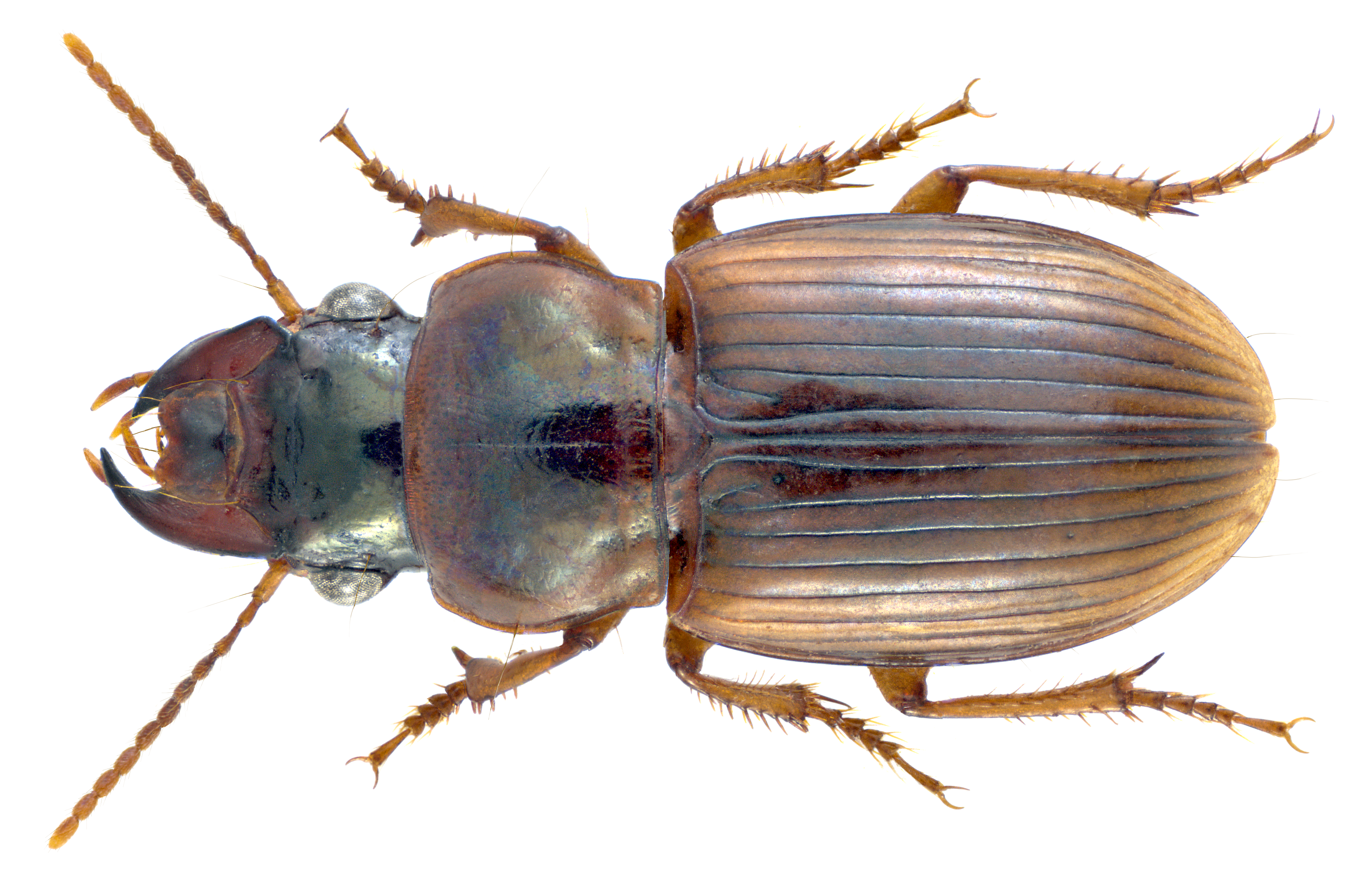
- Cratognathus grandiceps

Scientific classification
- Kingdom: Animalia
- Phylum: Arthropoda
- Class: Insecta
- Order: Coleoptera
- Suborder: Adephaga
- Family: Carabidae
- Subfamily: Harpalinae
- Tribe: Harpalini
- Subtribe: Harpalina
- Genus: Cratognathus; Dejean, 1829

Synonyms
- Cyphogenius Chaudoir, 1843; Daptomorphus Chaudoir, 1837; Encephalus Péringuey, 1896; Eucephalus Laporte, 1835; Micracinopus Casey, 1914

= Cratognathus =

Genus of beetles

Cratognathus is a genus in the ground beetle family Carabidae. There are about five described species in Cratognathus, found in Africa.

== Species ==
These five species belong to the genus Cratognathus:

- Cratognathus alluaudi Basilewsky, 1946 (Kenya, Tanzania)
- Cratognathus capensis (Laporte, 1835) (Namibia, South Africa)
- Cratognathus grandiceps (Boheman, 1860) (Mozambique, Zimbabwe, Botswana, Namibia, South Africa)
- Cratognathus mandibularis Dejean, 1829 (Botswana, South Africa)
- Cratognathus straneoi Basilewsky, 1948 (Namibia)
