= Dregus =

Scientific classification
- Kingdom: Animalia
- Phylum: Arthropoda
- Class: Insecta
- Order: Coleoptera
- Suborder: Adephaga
- Family: Carabidae
- Subfamily: Harpalinae
- Tribe: Harpalini
- Subtribe: Harpalina
- Genus: Dregus; Motschulsky, 1864
- Species: D. glebalis

Binomial name
- Dregus glebalis (Coquerel, 1859)

Species of beetle

Dregus is a genus in the ground beetle family Carabidae. This genus has a single species, Dregus glebalis. It is found in Morocco, Algeria, and Tunisia.
