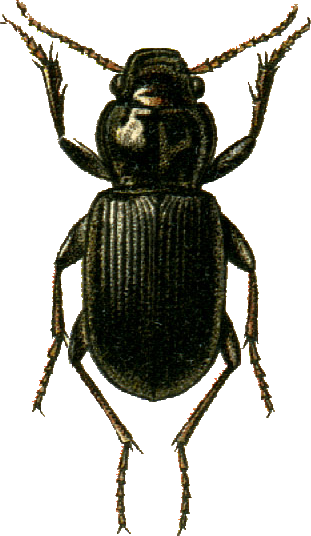

Scientific classification
- Kingdom: Animalia
- Phylum: Arthropoda
- Class: Insecta
- Order: Coleoptera
- Suborder: Adephaga
- Family: Carabidae
- Tribe: Harpalini
- Subtribe: Harpalina
- Genus: Pangus; Dejean, 1821
- Species: P. scaritides

Binomial name
- Pangus scaritides (Sturm, 1818)

= Pangus =

Species of beetle

Pangus is a genus of ground beetles in the family Carabidae. This genus has a single species, Pangus scaritides.
