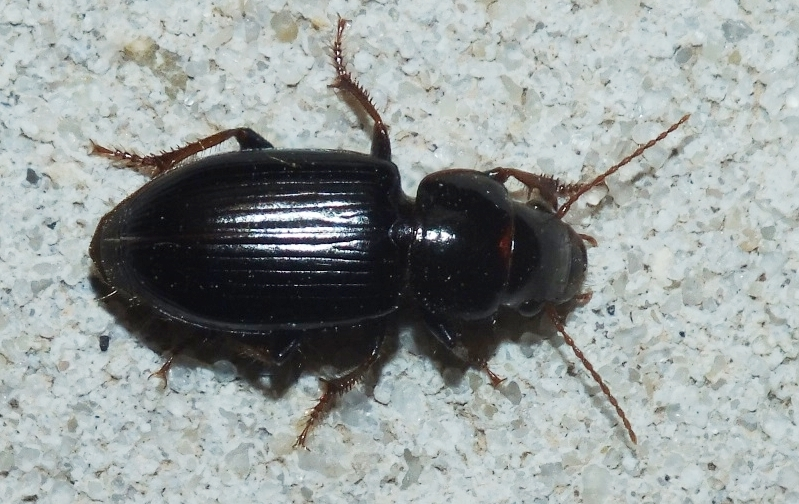
- Microderes brachypus, Russia

Scientific classification
- Domain: Eukaryota
- Kingdom: Animalia
- Phylum: Arthropoda
- Class: Insecta
- Order: Coleoptera
- Suborder: Adephaga
- Family: Carabidae
- Subfamily: Harpalinae
- Tribe: Harpalini
- Subtribe: Harpalina
- Genus: Microderes; Faldermann, 1836

Subgenera
- Microderes Faldermann, 1836; Microharpalus Tschitscherine, 1901; Neopangus Tschitscherine, 1898

= Microderes =

Genus of beetles

Microderes is a genus in the ground beetle family Carabidae. There are about nine described species in Microderes, found in the Palearctic.

== Species ==
These nine species belong to the genus Microderes:

- Microderes brachypus (Steven, 1809)
- Microderes breviformis (Tschitscherine, 1898)
- Microderes diversopunctatus (Solsky, 1874)
- Microderes intermittens (Solsky, 1874)
- Microderes namanganensis (Heyden, 1885)
- Microderes nanulus (Tschitscherine, 1898)
- Microderes subtilis (Tschitscherine, 1898)
- Microderes taschketensis (Jedlicka, 1958)
- Microderes undulatus (Gebler, 1841)
