= Neophygas =

Scientific classification
- Domain: Eukaryota
- Kingdom: Animalia
- Phylum: Arthropoda
- Class: Insecta
- Order: Coleoptera
- Suborder: Adephaga
- Family: Carabidae
- Subfamily: Harpalinae
- Tribe: Harpalini
- Subtribe: Harpalina
- Genus: Neophygas; Noonan, 1976
- Species: N. microcephalus

Binomial name
- Neophygas microcephalus (Faldermann, 1835)

Synonyms
- Phygas Motschulsky, 1848

Species of beetle

Neophygas is a genus in the ground beetle family Carabidae. This genus has a single species, Neophygas microcephalus. It is found in Kazakhstan, China, Russia, and Mongolia.
