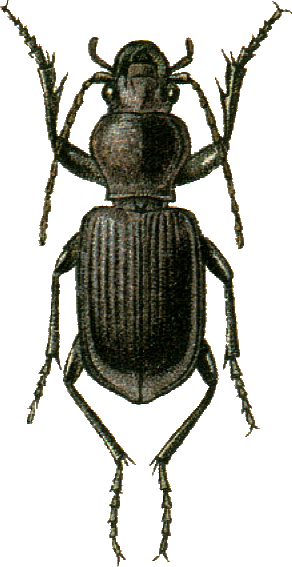
- Chilotomus chalybaeus

Scientific classification
- Domain: Eukaryota
- Kingdom: Animalia
- Phylum: Arthropoda
- Class: Insecta
- Order: Coleoptera
- Suborder: Adephaga
- Family: Carabidae
- Subfamily: Harpalinae
- Tribe: Harpalini
- Subtribe: Ditomina
- Genus: Chilotomus; Chaudoir, 1842

Synonyms
- Cholochilus Motschulsky, 1850; Colochilus Motschulsky, 1850

= Chilotomus =

Genus of beetles

Chilotomus is a genus in the ground beetle family Carabidae. There are about eight described species in Chilotomus, found in Asia.

== Species ==
These eight species belong to the genus Chilotomus:

- Chilotomus alexandri Kalashyan, 1999 (Armenia)
- Chilotomus arnoldii Kryzhanovskij, 1962 (Azerbaijan)
- Chilotomus chalybeus (Faldermann, 1836) (Iran, Turkmenistan)
- Chilotomus kuhitangi Kryzhanovskij, 1962 (Uzbekistan, Turkmenistan)
- Chilotomus margianus Kryzhanovskij, 1962 (Turkmenistan)
- Chilotomus tschitscherini Semenov, 1903 (Uzbekistan, Kyrgyzstan, Tadzhikistan)
- Chilotomus usgentensis Schauberger, 1932 (Uzbekistan, Kyrgyzstan)
- Chilotomus violaceus Kryzhanovskij & Mikhailov, 1971 (Kazakhstan)
