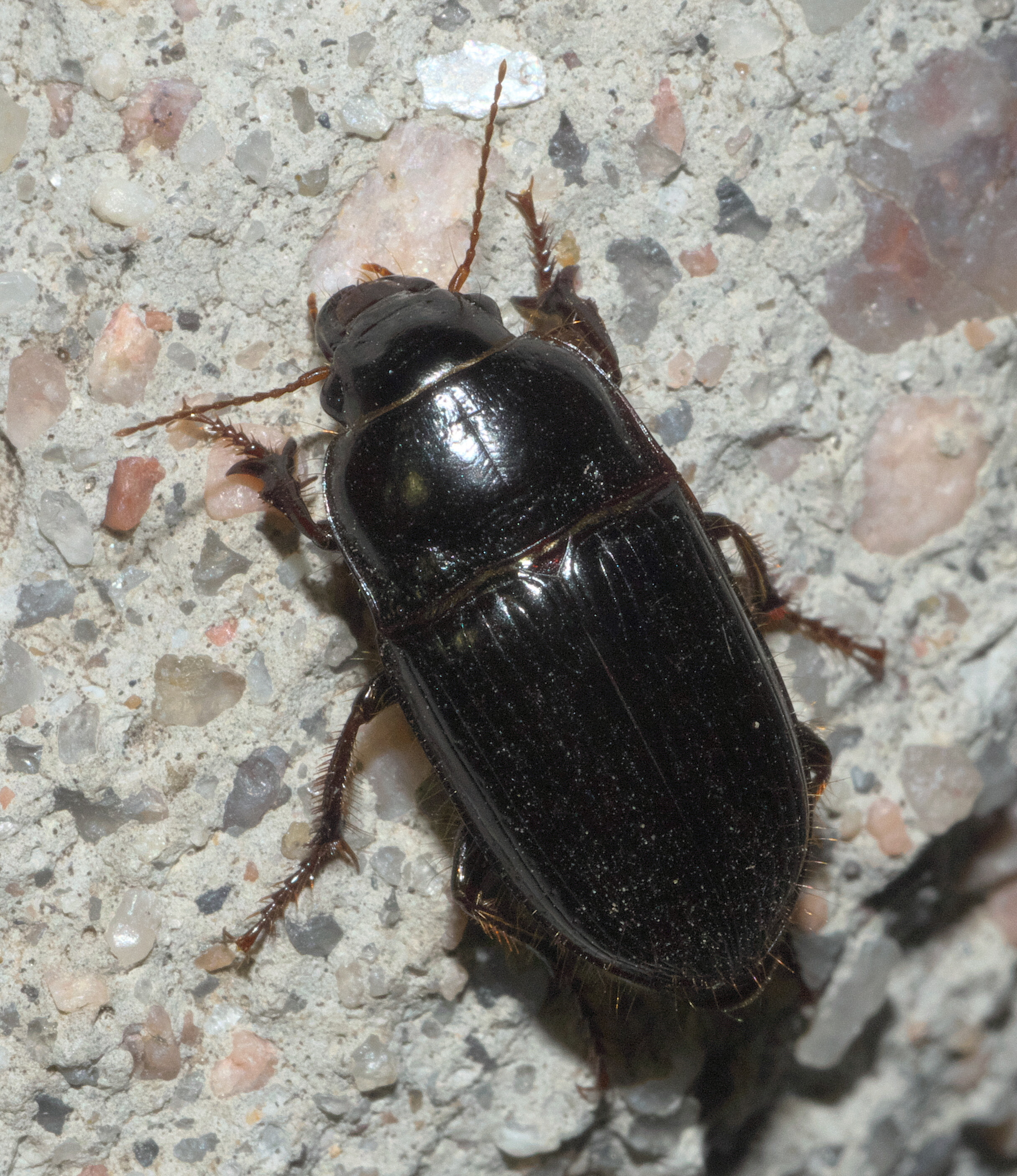
- Euryderus grossus, Colorado

Scientific classification
- Kingdom: Animalia
- Phylum: Arthropoda
- Class: Insecta
- Order: Coleoptera
- Suborder: Adephaga
- Family: Carabidae
- Subfamily: Harpalinae
- Tribe: Harpalini
- Subtribe: Harpalina
- Genus: Euryderus; LeConte, 1846

= Euryderus =

Species of beetle

Euryderus is a genus in the beetle family Carabidae. There are at least two described species in Euryderus.

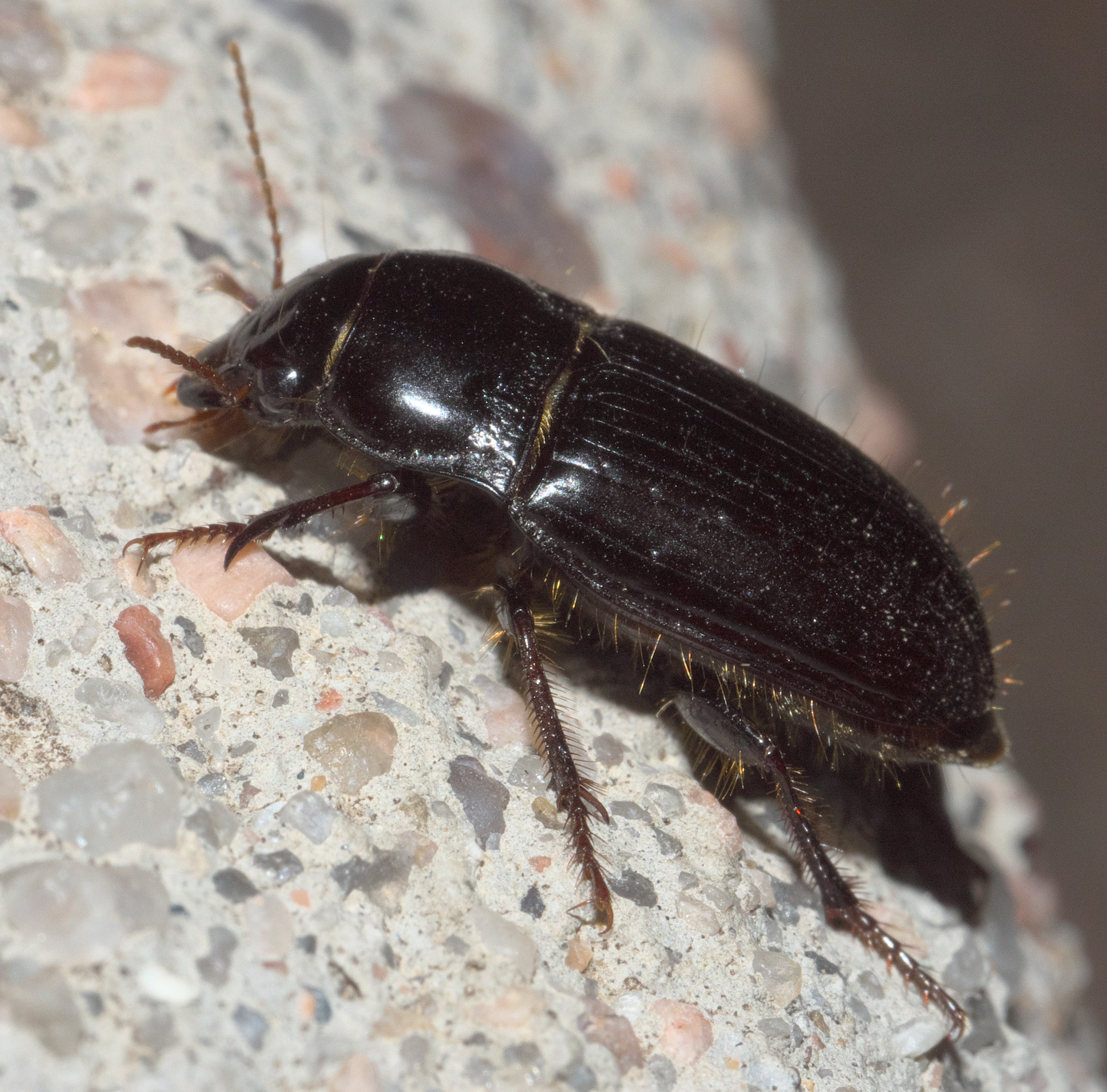
Euryderus grossus, Colorado

== Species ==
These two species belong to the genus Euryderus:

- Euryderus grossus (Say, 1830) (United States and Canada)
- † Euryderus kingii (Scudder, 1900)
