= Ophoniscus =

Scientific classification
- Domain: Eukaryota
- Kingdom: Animalia
- Phylum: Arthropoda
- Class: Insecta
- Order: Coleoptera
- Suborder: Adephaga
- Family: Carabidae
- Subfamily: Harpalinae
- Tribe: Harpalini
- Subtribe: Harpalina
- Genus: Ophoniscus; Bates, 1892

Genus of beetles

Ophoniscus is a genus in the beetle family Carabidae. There are about nine described species in Ophoniscus.

== Species ==
These nine species belong to the genus Ophoniscus:

- Ophoniscus batesi Kataev, 2005 (Myanmar)
- Ophoniscus compositus (Walker, 1858) (Sri Lanka and India)
- Ophoniscus cribrifrons Bates, 1892 (China, Nepal, Southeast Asia)
- Ophoniscus hypolithoides Bates, 1892 (Myanmar and Thailand)
- Ophoniscus iridulus Bates, 1892 (China, Nepal, Southeast Asia)
- Ophoniscus lopatini Kataev, 2005 (Myanmar)
- Ophoniscus nepalensis Kataev & Wrase, 2012 (Nepal)
- Ophoniscus parvus Kataev, 2018 (Nepal)
- Ophoniscus puneensis Kataev, 2018 (India)
