= Oxycentrus =

Scientific classification
- Domain: Eukaryota
- Kingdom: Animalia
- Phylum: Arthropoda
- Class: Insecta
- Order: Coleoptera
- Suborder: Adephaga
- Family: Carabidae
- Subfamily: Harpalinae
- Tribe: Harpalini
- Subtribe: Harpalina
- Genus: Oxycentrus; Chaudoir, 1854

Subgenera
- Oxycentrus Chaudoir, 1854; Paroxycentrus N.Ito, 1996

Genus of beetles

Oxycentrus is a genus in the beetle family Carabidae. There are more than 60 described species in Oxycentrus.

== Species ==
These 69 species belong to the genus Oxycentrus:

- Oxycentrus acutipennis N.Ito, 1996 (Vietnam)
- Oxycentrus acutulus Bates, 1892 (Myanmar and Malaysia)
- Oxycentrus angusticeps N.Ito, 2000 (Laos)
- Oxycentrus angustipennis N.Ito, 2013
- Oxycentrus argutoroides (Bates, 1873) (South Korea and Japan)
- Oxycentrus assamensis Kirschenhofer, 1992 (India)
- Oxycentrus atratus Kirschenhofer, 1992 (Myanmar)
- Oxycentrus baehri N.Ito, 1996 (Thailand)
- Oxycentrus borneensis Bates, 1876 (Indonesia and Borneo)
- Oxycentrus cambodianicus N.Ito, 2008 (Cambodia)
- Oxycentrus castaneus Kirschenhofer, 1992 (Thailand)
- Oxycentrus changi Habu, 1978 (Japan and Taiwan)
- Oxycentrus doiinthanonensis N.Ito, 2008 (Thailand)
- Oxycentrus foveicollis Bates, 1889 (Cambodia and Laos)
- Oxycentrus fulgens N.Ito, 1997 (Vietnam)
- Oxycentrus giganteus N.Ito, 1996 (Thailand)
- Oxycentrus gracilitarsis N.Ito, 1996 (Thailand)
- Oxycentrus grandis (Emden, 1937) (Indonesia and Philippines)
- Oxycentrus gusenleitneri N.Ito, 1996 (Philippines)
- Oxycentrus hayakawai N.Ito, 2006 (Malaysia, Indonesia, and Borneo)
- Oxycentrus horni Schauberger, 1938 (Indonesia)
- Oxycentrus ignotus N.Ito, 2017 (Malaysia, Indonesia, and Borneo)
- Oxycentrus iridicolor N.Ito, 1996 (Malaysia)
- Oxycentrus ivani N.Ito, 1996 (Thailand)
- Oxycentrus javanus (Louwerens, 1951) (Indonesia)
- Oxycentrus jelineki N.Ito, 2006 (China)
- Oxycentrus kraatzi (Schauberger, 1938) (Indonesia)
- Oxycentrus laetus N.Ito, 2013
- Oxycentrus latemarginatus N.Ito, 2000 (Laos)
- Oxycentrus latus N.Ito, 2008 (Vietnam)
- Oxycentrus matanganus (Schauberger, 1934) (Indonesia and Borneo)
- Oxycentrus melas (Schmidt-Goebel, 1846) (Indomalaya)
- Oxycentrus micros Schauberger, 1938 (Indonesia)
- Oxycentrus minor (Louwerens, 1951) (Indonesia)
- Oxycentrus minutopunctatus N.Ito, 1998 (Philippines)
- Oxycentrus miyakei Habu, 1978 (Taiwan)
- Oxycentrus nakayamai N.Ito, 2012 (Thailand)
- Oxycentrus negrosensis N.Ito, 1998 (Philippines)
- Oxycentrus nitidus Andrewes, 1930 (Indonesia)
- Oxycentrus oblongicollis N.Ito, 1996 (Malaysia, Indonesia, and Borneo)
- Oxycentrus obtusibasis N.Ito, 2014 (Malaysia, Indonesia, and Borneo)
- Oxycentrus obtusicollis N.Ito, 1994 (Vietnam)
- Oxycentrus omaseoides Bates, 1892 (Nepal and Myanmar)
- Oxycentrus orinus (Andrewes, 1931) (Indonesia and Borneo)
- Oxycentrus parallelus Chaudoir, 1854 (Nepal, Bangladesh, and India)
- Oxycentrus parvus N.Ito, 1996 (Malaysia, Indonesia, and Borneo)
- Oxycentrus persimilis N.Ito, 2000 (Laos)
- Oxycentrus piceus (Louwerens, 1951) (Indonesia)
- Oxycentrus planibasis N.Ito, 1998 (Philippines)
- Oxycentrus punctatus N.Ito, 1996 (Malaysia)
- Oxycentrus quadricollis N.Ito, 1994 (Malaysia)
- Oxycentrus rectangulus N.Ito, 2000 (Laos)
- Oxycentrus rugifrons (Louwerens, 1954) (Indonesia)
- Oxycentrus sakaii N.Ito, 1998 (Philippines)
- Oxycentrus scabericollis N.Ito, 2013 (Bhutan)
- Oxycentrus schaubergeri N.Ito, 1996 (Malaysia, Indonesia, and Borneo)
- Oxycentrus shibatai N.Ito, 1993 (Indonesia and Borneo)
- Oxycentrus siamensis N.Ito, 1994 (Thailand)
- Oxycentrus sikkimensis Kirschenhofer, 1992 (India)
- Oxycentrus smetanai N.Ito, 1996 (Malaysia, Indonesia, and Borneo)
- Oxycentrus striatus N.Ito, 2008 (Pakistan)
- Oxycentrus striolatus Andrewes, 1930 (Indonesia)
- Oxycentrus subarcuaticollis N.Ito, 1997 (Vietnam)
- Oxycentrus subcylindratus N.Ito, 2008 (Vietnam)
- Oxycentrus subdepressus N.Ito, 1994 (Taiwan)
- Oxycentrus subovatus N.Ito, 1993 (Indonesia and Borneo)
- Oxycentrus sulciclypeus N.Ito, 2013
- Oxycentrus taichishibatai N.Ito, 2008 (Indonesia and Borneo)
- Oxycentrus yoshidai N.Ito, 2001 (Myanmar)
