= Nothodaptus =

Scientific classification
- Kingdom: Animalia
- Phylum: Arthropoda
- Class: Insecta
- Order: Coleoptera
- Suborder: Adephaga
- Family: Carabidae
- Tribe: Harpalini
- Subtribe: Harpalina
- Genus: Nothodaptus; Maindron, 1906
- Species: N. simplex

Binomial name
- Nothodaptus simplex (Péringuey, 1896)

Synonyms
- Agriodus Péringuey, 1896

Species of beetle

Nothodaptus is a genus in the ground beetle family Carabidae. This genus has a single species, Nothodaptus simplex. It is found in Zimbabwe and Namibia.
