= Pseudodiachipteryx =

Scientific classification
- Kingdom: Animalia
- Phylum: Arthropoda
- Class: Insecta
- Order: Coleoptera
- Suborder: Adephaga
- Family: Carabidae
- Tribe: Harpalini
- Subtribe: Harpalina
- Genus: Pseudodiachipteryx; Burgeon, 1936
- Species: P. expansipennis

Binomial name
- Pseudodiachipteryx expansipennis Burgeon, 1936

Species of beetle

Pseudodiachipteryx is a genus in the ground beetle family Carabidae. This genus has a single species, Pseudodiachipteryx expansipennis. It is found in Africa.
