= Harpathaumas =

Scientific classification
- Domain: Eukaryota
- Kingdom: Animalia
- Phylum: Arthropoda
- Class: Insecta
- Order: Coleoptera
- Suborder: Adephaga
- Family: Carabidae
- Subfamily: Harpalinae
- Tribe: Harpalini
- Subtribe: Harpalina
- Genus: Harpathaumas; Basilewsky, 1947
- Species: H. priscus

Binomial name
- Harpathaumas priscus Basilewsky, 1947

Species of beetle

Harpathaumas is a genus of ground beetles in the subfamily Harpalinae. It has single species, Harpathaumas priscus.
