= Harpalinus =

Scientific classification
- Domain: Eukaryota
- Kingdom: Animalia
- Phylum: Arthropoda
- Class: Insecta
- Order: Coleoptera
- Suborder: Adephaga
- Family: Carabidae
- Subfamily: Harpalinae
- Tribe: Harpalini
- Subtribe: Harpalina
- Genus: Harpalinus; Jeannel, 1946

Genus of beetles

Harpalinus is a genus of carabids in the beetle family Carabidae. There are at least three described species in Harpalinus, found in Madagascar.

== Species ==
These three species belong to the genus Harpalinus:

- Harpalinus bekilyanus Jeannel, 1948
- Harpalinus flavilabris (Fairmaire, 1869)
- Harpalinus micros Jeannel, 1948
