= Harpalodiodes =

Scientific classification
- Domain: Eukaryota
- Kingdom: Animalia
- Phylum: Arthropoda
- Class: Insecta
- Order: Coleoptera
- Suborder: Adephaga
- Family: Carabidae
- Subfamily: Harpalinae
- Tribe: Harpalini
- Subtribe: Harpalina
- Genus: Harpalodiodes; Bousquet, 2002
- Species: H. xanthorhaphus

Binomial name
- Harpalodiodes xanthorhaphus (Wiedemann, 1825)

Synonyms
- Harpalodes Basilewsky, 1951

Species of beetle

Harpalodiodes is a genus of carabids in the beetle family Carabidae. This genus has a single species, Harpalodiodes xanthorhaphus. It is found in Namibia and South Africa.
