= Neodiachipteryx =

Scientific classification
- Domain: Eukaryota
- Kingdom: Animalia
- Phylum: Arthropoda
- Class: Insecta
- Order: Coleoptera
- Suborder: Adephaga
- Family: Carabidae
- Subfamily: Harpalinae
- Tribe: Harpalini
- Subtribe: Harpalina
- Genus: Neodiachipteryx; Noonan, 1985

Species of beetle

Neodiachipteryx is a genus in the beetle family Carabidae. There are at least two described species in Neodiachipteryx.

== Species ==
These two species belong to the genus Neodiachipteryx:

- Neodiachipteryx carinigera (Putzeys, 1878) (Hispaniola)
- Neodiachipteryx davidsoni Shpeley; Hunting & Ball, 2017 (Hispaniola)
