= Hyphaereon =

Scientific classification
- Domain: Eukaryota
- Kingdom: Animalia
- Phylum: Arthropoda
- Class: Insecta
- Order: Coleoptera
- Suborder: Adephaga
- Family: Carabidae
- Subfamily: Harpalinae
- Tribe: Harpalini
- Subtribe: Harpalina
- Genus: Hyphaereon; W.S.MacLeay, 1825

Subgenera
- Calathomimus Bates, 1886; Hyphaereon W.S.MacLeay, 1825

Genus of beetles

Hyphaereon is a genus in the beetle family Carabidae. There are at least 30 described species in Hyphaereon.

== Species ==
These 30 species belong to the genus Hyphaereon:

- Hyphaereon baehri N.Ito, 2004 (Malaysia, Indonesia, and Borneo)
- Hyphaereon borneensis N.Ito, 1990 (Malaysia, Indonesia, and Borneo)
- Hyphaereon celebensis Louwerens, 1951 (Indonesia)
- Hyphaereon chinensis N.Ito, 2008 (China)
- Hyphaereon consors (Bates, 1886) (Sri Lanka)
- Hyphaereon cordens Darlington, 1968 (New Guinea)
- Hyphaereon drescheri (Andrewes, 1937) (Indonesia)
- Hyphaereon hornianus (Schauberger, 1938) (Sri Lanka)
- Hyphaereon laeviventris N.Ito, 2017 (Malaysia, Indonesia, and Borneo)
- Hyphaereon laosensis N.Ito, 2004 (Laos)
- Hyphaereon lautulus Andrewes, 1929 (Indonesia and Borneo)
- Hyphaereon lawrencei N.Ito, 1997 (Thailand and Malaysia)
- Hyphaereon levis Darlington, 1968 (Indonesia and New Guinea)
- Hyphaereon limatus (Andrewes, 1937) (Indonesia)
- Hyphaereon maculatus (Bates, 1886) (Sri Lanka)
- Hyphaereon masumotoi (N.Ito, 1991) (Thailand and Laos)
- Hyphaereon ocularis N.Ito, 2008 (Thailand)
- Hyphaereon pallidipes N.Ito, 2004 (Laos)
- Hyphaereon planicollis N.Ito, 2008 (Malaysia)
- Hyphaereon planipennis N.Ito, 2007 (Vietnam)
- Hyphaereon platynoides N.Ito, 2008 (Thailand)
- Hyphaereon reflexus (W.S.MacLeay, 1825) (Indonesia)
- Hyphaereon shibatai (N.Ito, 1990) (Taiwan)
- Hyphaereon splendidipennis N.Ito, 2016 (India)
- Hyphaereon subdenticollis N.Ito, 2017 (Indonesia)
- Hyphaereon subviridipennis N.Ito, 2004 (Laos)
- Hyphaereon timidus Darlington, 1968 (Indonesia and New Guinea)
- Hyphaereon trusmadiensis N.Ito, 2008 (Indonesia and Borneo)
- Hyphaereon uenoi (N.Ito, 1995) (Indonesia)
- Hyphaereon vittatus (Andrewes, 1926) (Sri Lanka)
