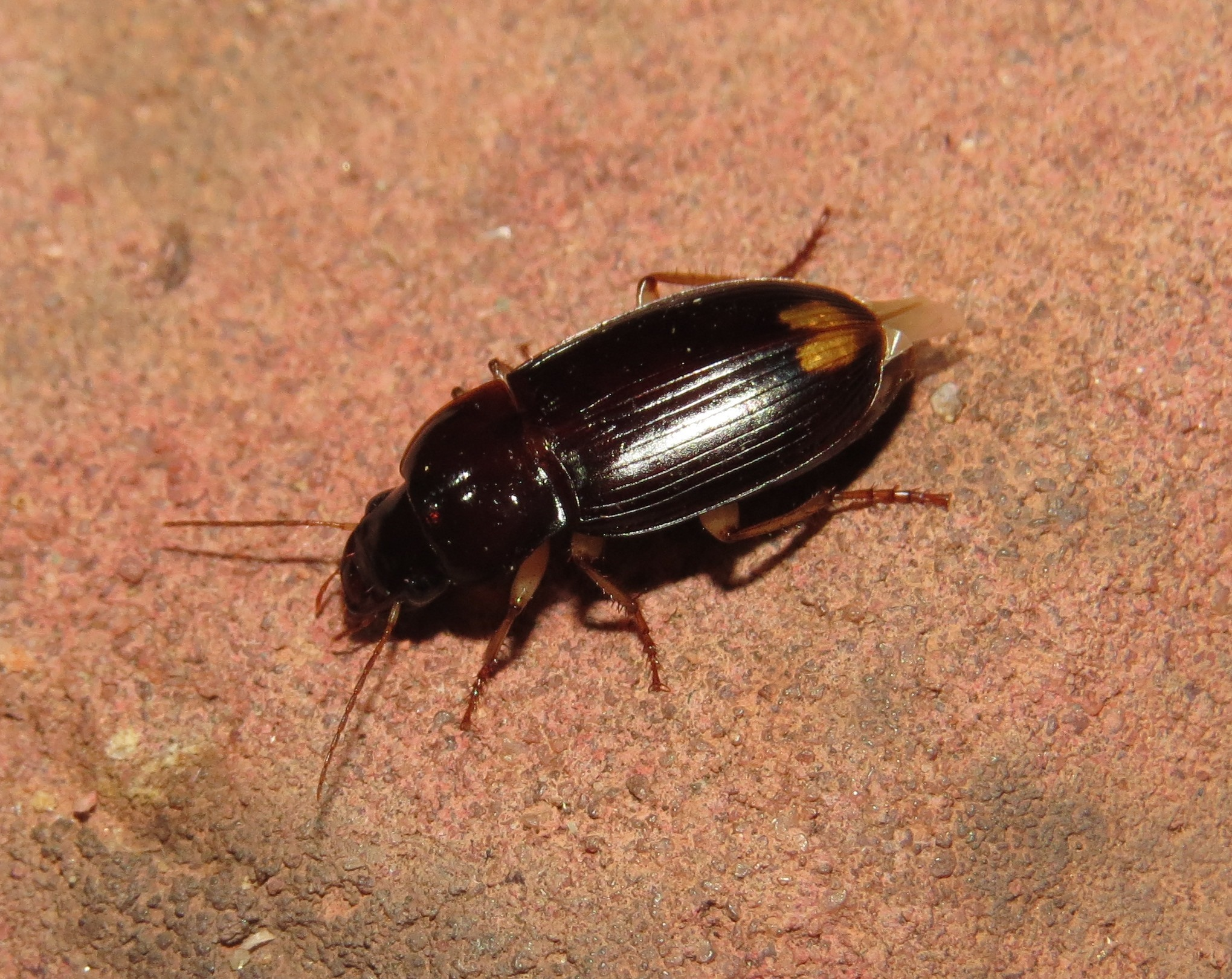
- Parasiopelus ornatus, South Africa

Scientific classification
- Domain: Eukaryota
- Kingdom: Animalia
- Phylum: Arthropoda
- Class: Insecta
- Order: Coleoptera
- Suborder: Adephaga
- Family: Carabidae
- Subfamily: Harpalinae
- Tribe: Harpalini
- Subtribe: Harpalina
- Genus: Parasiopelus; Basilewsky, 1946

Synonyms
- Tukyellus Basilewsky, 1947

= Parasiopelus =

Genus of beetles

Parasiopelus is a genus in the ground beetle family Carabidae. There are at least two described species in Parasiopelus, found in Africa.

== Species ==
These two species belong to the genus Parasiopelus:

- Parasiopelus ornatus (Péringuey, 1892) (Africa)
- Parasiopelus somalicus (Basilewsky, 1957) (Somalia, Kenya)
