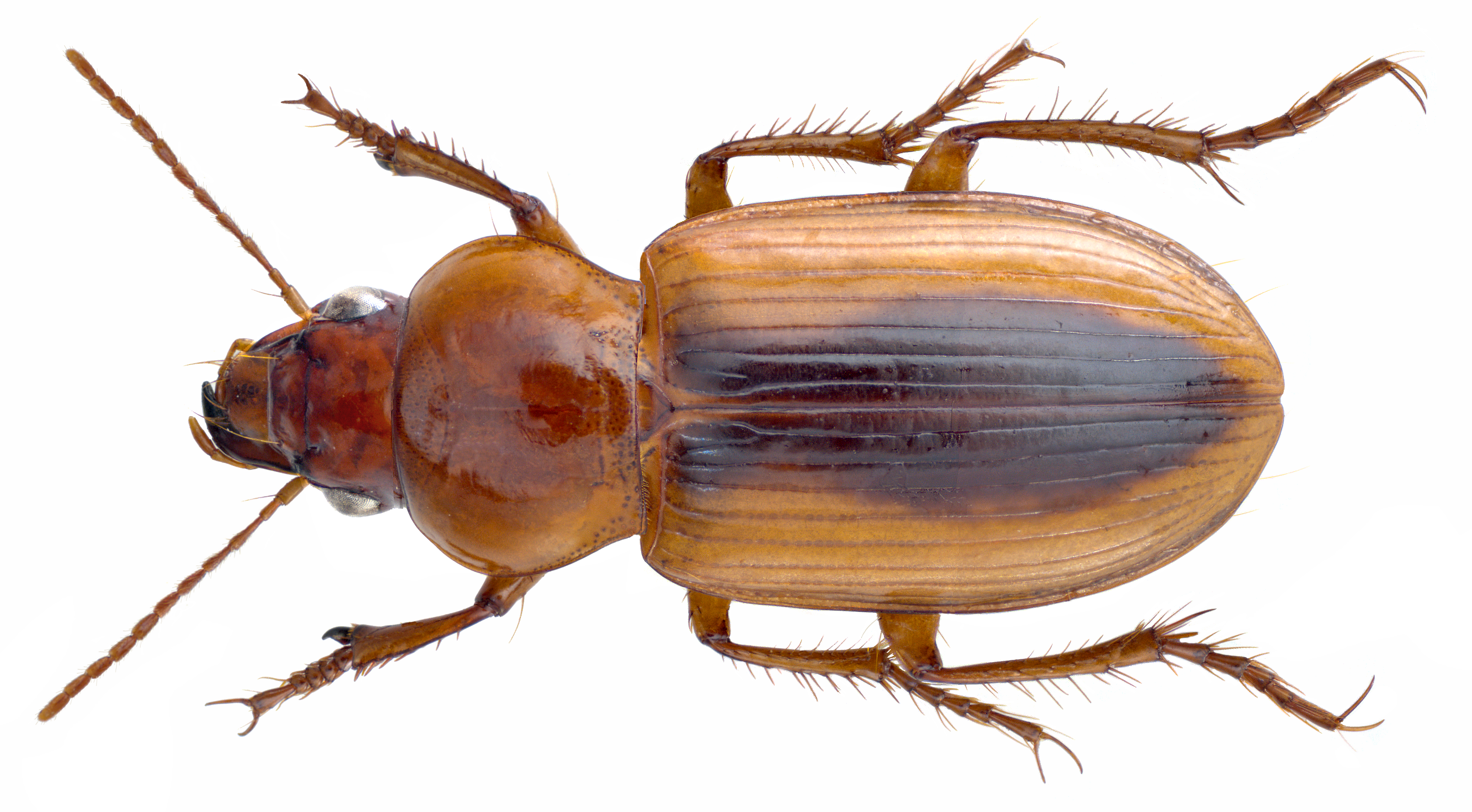
- Boeomimetes confusus

Scientific classification
- Kingdom: Animalia
- Phylum: Arthropoda
- Class: Insecta
- Order: Coleoptera
- Suborder: Adephaga
- Family: Carabidae
- Subfamily: Harpalinae
- Tribe: Harpalini
- Subtribe: Harpalina
- Genus: Boeomimetes; Péringuey, 1896

= Boeomimetes =

Genus of beetles

Boeomimetes is a genus in the beetle family Carabidae. There are about five described species in Boeomimetes, found in Africa.

== Species ==
These five species belong to the genus Boeomimetes:

- Boeomimetes atratus Péringuey, 1896 (Zimbabwe, Namibia, and South Africa)
- Boeomimetes confusus Basilewsky, 1948 (Botswana, Namibia, and South Africa)
- Boeomimetes ephippium (Boheman, 1860) (Mozambique, Zimbabwe, Botswana, Namibia, and South Africa)
- Boeomimetes jeanneli Basilewsky, 1946 (Somalia, Kenya, and Tanzania)
- Boeomimetes somalicus Basilewsky, 1964 (Somalia, Tanzania, Angola, Zimbabwe, Botswana, and Namibia)
