= Proditomus =

Scientific classification
- Domain: Eukaryota
- Kingdom: Animalia
- Phylum: Arthropoda
- Class: Insecta
- Order: Coleoptera
- Suborder: Adephaga
- Family: Carabidae
- Subfamily: Harpalinae
- Tribe: Harpalini
- Subtribe: Ditomina
- Genus: Proditomus; Schauberger, 1934
- Species: P. mirus

Binomial name
- Proditomus mirus Schauberger, 1934

Species of beetle

Proditomus is a genus of ground beetles in the family Carabidae. This genus has a single species, Proditomus mirus.
