= Liochirus =

Scientific classification
- Domain: Eukaryota
- Kingdom: Animalia
- Phylum: Arthropoda
- Class: Insecta
- Order: Coleoptera
- Suborder: Adephaga
- Family: Carabidae
- Subfamily: Harpalinae
- Tribe: Harpalini
- Subtribe: Ditomina
- Genus: Liochirus; Tschitscherine, 1897
- Species: L. cycloderus

Binomial name
- Liochirus cycloderus (Solsky, 1874)

Species of insect

Liochirus is a genus in the beetle family Carabidae. This genus has a single species, Liochirus cycloderus. It is found in Asia.
