= Penthus tenebrioides =

Scientific classification
- Kingdom: Animalia
- Phylum: Arthropoda
- Class: Insecta
- Order: Coleoptera
- Suborder: Adephaga
- Family: Carabidae
- Subfamily: Harpalinae
- Tribe: Harpalini
- Subtribe: Ditomina
- Genus: Penthus; Chaudoir, 1843
- Species: P. tenebrioides

Binomial name
- Penthus tenebrioides (Waltl, 1838)

Species of beetle

Penthus tenebrioides is a species of beetle in the family Carabidae, the only species in the genus Penthus.
