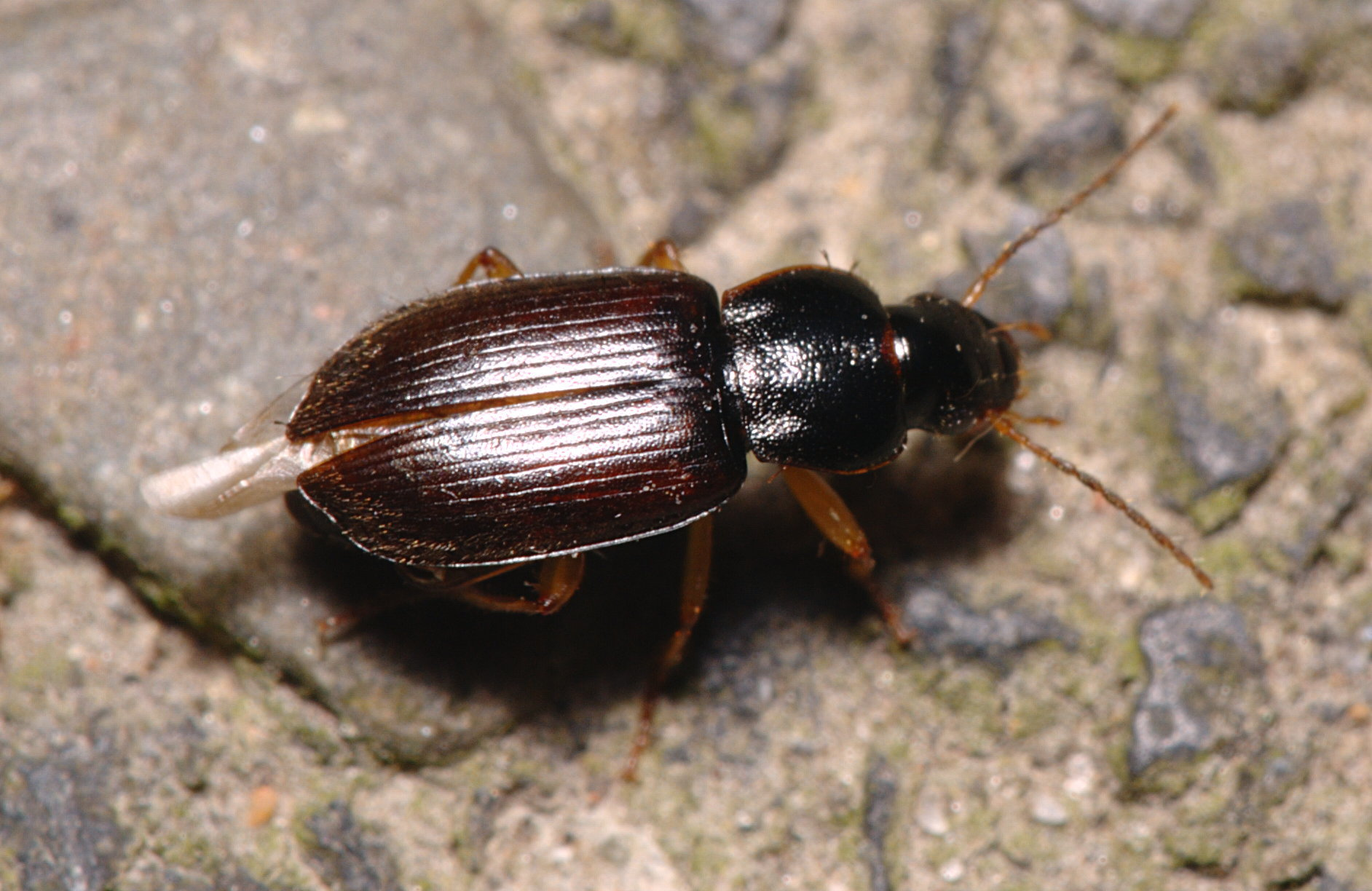
- Parophonus maculicornis, Germany

Scientific classification
- Domain: Eukaryota
- Kingdom: Animalia
- Phylum: Arthropoda
- Class: Insecta
- Order: Coleoptera
- Suborder: Adephaga
- Family: Carabidae
- Subfamily: Harpalinae
- Tribe: Harpalini
- Subtribe: Harpalina
- Genus: Parophonus; Ganglbauer, 1891

Subgenera
- Heterohyparpalus Basilewsky, 1946; Hyparpalinus Lecordier, 1984; Hyparpalus Alluaud, 1930; Ophonomimus Schauberger, 1923; Parophonus Ganglbauer, 1891

= Parophonus =

Genus of beetles

Parophonus is a genus in the beetle family Carabidae. There are more than 70 described species in Parophonus.

== Species ==
These 77 species belong to the genus Parophonus:

- Parophonus acutangulus (Bates, 1891)
- Parophonus ambiguus (Lecordier, 1982)
- Parophonus angulatus (Lecordier, 1988)
- Parophonus angusticollis (Lecordier, 1982)
- Parophonus antoinei (Schauberger, 1932)
- Parophonus apodemus (Alluaud, 1934)
- Parophonus arbonnieri (Lecordier, 1984)
- Parophonus axinotomoides (Basilewsky, 1968)
- Parophonus bruneaui (Lecordier, 1984)
- Parophonus caffer (Boheman, 1848)
- Parophonus colmanti (Burgeon, 1936)
- Parophonus congener (Dejean, 1829)
- Parophonus conspectus (Lecordier, 1988)
- Parophonus conviva (Kolbe, 1898)
- Parophonus cyanellus (Bates, 1889)
- Parophonus cyaneotinctus (Bates, 1889)
- Parophonus decellei (Lecordier, 1983)
- Parophonus dejeani (Csiki, 1932)
- Parophonus deplanatus (Basilewsky, 1946)
- Parophonus dia (Reitter, 1900)
- Parophonus escheri (Dejean, 1831)
- Parophonus formosanus (Jedlicka, 1940)
- Parophonus fossulatus (Lecordier, 1984)
- Parophonus girardi (Lecordier, 1982)
- Parophonus gojebensis (Clarke, 1971)
- Parophonus hespericus Jeanne, 1985
- Parophonus hirsutulus (Dejean, 1829)
- Parophonus hirsutus (Lecordier, 1988)
- Parophonus hispanus (Rambur, 1838)
- Parophonus holosericeus (Dejean, 1829)
- Parophonus iberiparcus Zaballos & Garcia-Muñoz, 1991
- Parophonus imitativus (Péringuey, 1908)
- Parophonus indicus (Andrewes, 1931)
- Parophonus inquinulus (Lecordier, 1984)
- Parophonus integer (Péringuey, 1896)
- Parophonus interstitialis (Reitter, 1889)
- Parophonus javanus (Gory, 1833)
- Parophonus juvencus (Dejean, 1829)
- Parophonus kenyanus Facchini & Schüle, 2020
- Parophonus knyi Wrase, 2001
- Parophonus laeviceps (Ménétriés, 1832)
- Parophonus lepidus (Lecordier, 1984)
- Parophonus lividus (Andrewes, 1923)
- Parophonus maculicornis (Duftschmid, 1812)
- Parophonus marginicollis (Boheman, 1848)
- Parophonus marshalli (Barker, 1922)
- Parophonus mendax (P.Rossi, 1790)
- Parophonus mirei (Lecordier, 1982)
- Parophonus moestus (Putzeys in Chaudoir, 1878)
- Parophonus nigripes (Burgeon, 1936)
- Parophonus nossibianus (Brancsik, 1893)
- Parophonus optivus (Péringuey, 1908)
- Parophonus orientalis (Lecordier, 1984)
- Parophonus ovalipennis (Schauberger, 1932)
- Parophonus picilabris (LaFerté-Sénectère, 1853)
- Parophonus pierroni Jeannel, 1948
- Parophonus planicollis (Dejean, 1829)
- Parophonus porrectus (Péringuey, 1896)
- Parophonus pseudosericeus (Lecordier, 1982)
- Parophonus pusillus (Lecordier, 1984)
- Parophonus quisquilius (Lecordier, 1983)
- Parophonus rectangulus N.Ito, 1994
- Parophonus rotundangulus Facchini, 2016
- Parophonus saponarius (Olivier, 1795)
- Parophonus sericeus (Coquerel, 1866)
- Parophonus spatulus (Lecordier, 1986)
- Parophonus spretus (Lecordier, 1982)
- Parophonus strenuus (Péringuey, 1898)
- Parophonus stricticollis (Lecordier, 1983)
- Parophonus substrictus (Lecordier, 1988)
- Parophonus subtilis (Bates, 1892)
- Parophonus tetricus (Péringuey, 1908)
- Parophonus tomentosus (Dejean, 1829)
- Parophonus ugandanus (Basilewsky, 1946)
- Parophonus unicolor Facchini & Schüle, 2020
- Parophonus vigil Tschitscherine, 1901
- Parophonus vitalisi (Andrewes, 1922)
