= Oosoma =

Scientific classification
- Domain: Eukaryota
- Kingdom: Animalia
- Phylum: Arthropoda
- Class: Insecta
- Order: Coleoptera
- Suborder: Adephaga
- Family: Carabidae
- Subfamily: Harpalinae
- Tribe: Harpalini
- Subtribe: Amblystomina
- Genus: Oosoma; Nietner, 1857

Genus of beetles

Oosoma is a genus in the ground beetle family Carabidae. There are at least two described species in Oosoma.

== Species ==
These two species belong to the genus Oosoma:

- Oosoma gyllenhalii (Dejean, 1829) (Sri Lanka, India)
- Oosoma semivittatum (Fabricius, 1798) (China, Sri Lanka, India, Vietnam)
