= Liodaptus =

Scientific classification
- Domain: Eukaryota
- Kingdom: Animalia
- Phylum: Arthropoda
- Class: Insecta
- Order: Coleoptera
- Suborder: Adephaga
- Family: Carabidae
- Subfamily: Harpalinae
- Tribe: Harpalini
- Subtribe: Harpalina
- Genus: Liodaptus; Bates, 1889

Genus of beetles

Liodaptus is a genus in the ground beetle family Carabidae. There are at least two described species in Liodaptus, found in south and southeast Asia.

== Species ==
These two species belong to the genus Liodaptus:

- Liodaptus birmanus Bates, 1889 (China, Pakistan, Bangladesh, India, Myanmar, Thailand)
- Liodaptus longicornis Lesne, 1896 (Laos)
