= Graniger =

Scientific classification
- Kingdom: Animalia
- Phylum: Arthropoda
- Class: Insecta
- Order: Coleoptera
- Suborder: Adephaga
- Family: Carabidae
- Subfamily: Harpalinae
- Tribe: Harpalini
- Subtribe: Ditomina
- Genus: Graniger; Motschulsky, 1864

Synonyms
- Carterophonus Ganglbauer, 1891

Genus of beetles

Graniger is a genus of carabids in the beetle family Carabidae. There are at least two described species in Graniger, found in Europe, North Africa, and western Asia.

== Species ==
These two species belong to the genus Graniger:

- Graniger cordicollis (Audinet-Serville, 1821)
- Graniger femoralis (Coquerel, 1859)
