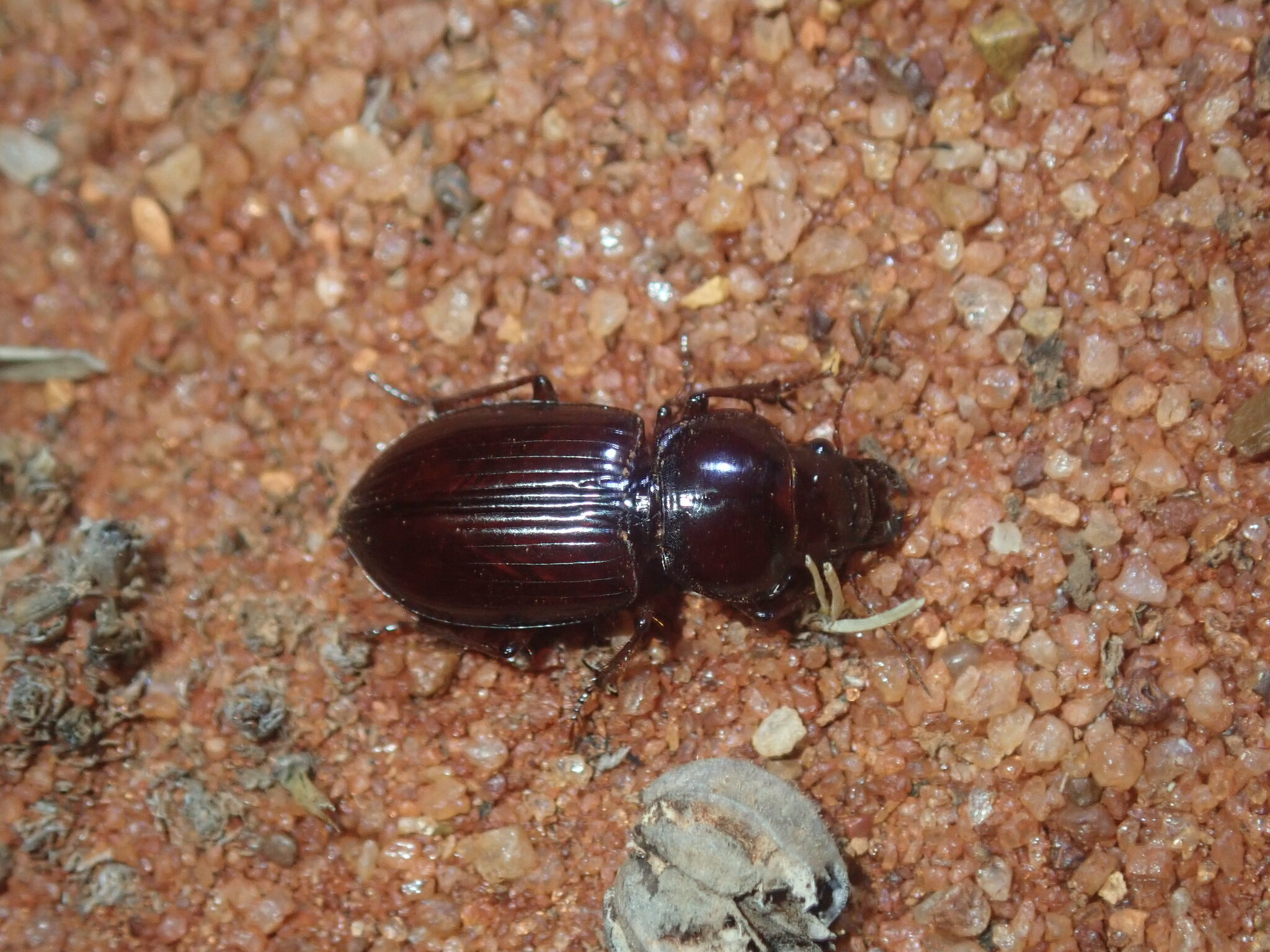
- Phorticosomus, Australia

Scientific classification
- Domain: Eukaryota
- Kingdom: Animalia
- Phylum: Arthropoda
- Class: Insecta
- Order: Coleoptera
- Suborder: Adephaga
- Family: Carabidae
- Subfamily: Harpalinae
- Tribe: Harpalini
- Subtribe: Ditomina
- Genus: Phorticosomus; Schaum, 1863

Synonyms
- Forticosomus Laporte, 1868

= Phorticosomus =

Genus of beetles

Phorticosomus is a genus in the ground beetle family Carabidae. There are about 18 described species in Phorticosomus, found in Australia.

== Species ==
These 18 species belong to the genus Phorticosomus:

- Phorticosomus castelnaui Sloane, 1915
- Phorticosomus crassus Sloane, 1915
- Phorticosomus edelii Laporte, 1867
- Phorticosomus felix Schaum, 1863
- Phorticosomus franzi Baehr, 1998
- Phorticosomus grandis Laporte, 1867
- Phorticosomus gularis Sloane, 1915
- Phorticosomus horni Sloane, 1896
- Phorticosomus macleayi Sloane, 1915
- Phorticosomus mucronatus Blackburn, 1888
- Phorticosomus nuytsii Laporte, 1867
- Phorticosomus piceus Sloane, 1915
- Phorticosomus randalli Blackburn, 1890
- Phorticosomus robustus Blackburn, 1889
- Phorticosomus rotundatus B.Moore, 1967
- Phorticosomus rugiceps W.J.MacLeay, 1871
- Phorticosomus similis Blackburn, 1888
- Phorticosomus zabroides Sloane, 1910
