= Indiophonus =

Scientific classification
- Domain: Eukaryota
- Kingdom: Animalia
- Phylum: Arthropoda
- Class: Insecta
- Order: Coleoptera
- Suborder: Adephaga
- Family: Carabidae
- Subfamily: Harpalinae
- Tribe: Harpalini
- Subtribe: Harpalina
- Genus: Indiophonus; N.Ito, 1996
- Species: I. pilosus

Binomial name
- Indiophonus pilosus N.Ito, 1996

Species of beetle

Indiophonus is a genus in the ground beetle family Carabidae. This genus has a single species, Indiophonus pilosus. It is found in India.
