= Harpalomorphus =

Scientific classification
- Domain: Eukaryota
- Kingdom: Animalia
- Phylum: Arthropoda
- Class: Insecta
- Order: Coleoptera
- Suborder: Adephaga
- Family: Carabidae
- Subfamily: Harpalinae
- Tribe: Harpalini
- Genus: Harpalomorphus; Peringuey, 1896

Genus of beetles

Harpalomorphus is a genus of beetles in the family Carabidae first described by Louis Péringuey in 1896.

== Species ==
Harpalomorphus contains the following seven species:

- Harpalomorphus aeneipennis Péringuey, 1896 (Namibia, South Africa)
- Harpalomorphus capicola Péringuey, 1896 (Botswana, Namibia, South Africa)
- Harpalomorphus minor Facchini, 2011 (South Africa)
- Harpalomorphus modestus Péringuey, 1896 (South Africa)
- Harpalomorphus pseudocapicola Facchini, 2011 (South Africa)
- Harpalomorphus rufipennis Péringuey, 1896 (South Africa)
- Harpalomorphus sinuaticollis Facchini, 2011 (South Africa)
