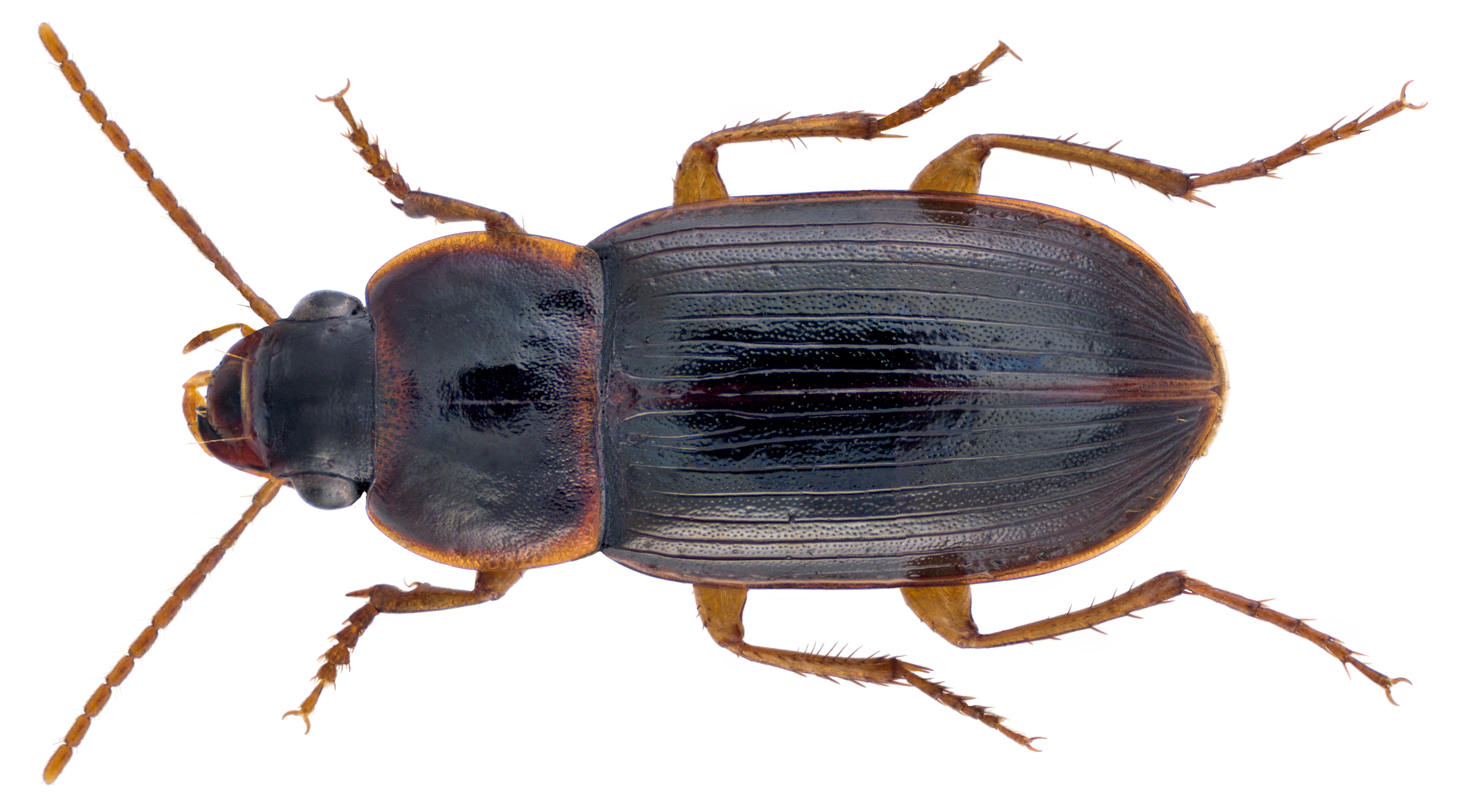
- Siopelus punctatellus

Scientific classification
- Domain: Eukaryota
- Kingdom: Animalia
- Phylum: Arthropoda
- Class: Insecta
- Order: Coleoptera
- Suborder: Adephaga
- Family: Carabidae
- Subfamily: Harpalinae
- Tribe: Harpalini
- Subtribe: Harpalina
- Genus: Siopelus; Murray, 1859

= Siopelus =

Genus of beetles

Siopelus is a genus of beetles in the family Carabidae, found mainly in Africa.

== Species ==
These 108 species belong to the genus Siopelus:

Subgenus Africobatus Basilewsky, 1946
Siopelus harpaloides (Guérin-Méneville, 1847)
Siopelus iricolor Lorenz, 1998
Subgenus Aulacoryssus Alluaud, 1916
Siopelus aciculatus (Dejean, 1829)
Siopelus bulirschi Facchini, 2002
Siopelus demeyeri Facchini, 2004
Siopelus pavoninus (Gerstaecker, 1867)
Siopelus persculptus (Basilewsky, 1968)
Siopelus zuzartei A.Serrano, 1999
Subgenus Haplocoleus Jeannel, 1948
Siopelus angolanus Facchini & Schüle, 2019
Siopelus ceradotus (Basilewsky, 1968)
Siopelus creberrimus (LaFerté-Sénectère, 1853)
Siopelus iris (Murray, 1859)
Siopelus lucens (Putzeys in Chaudoir, 1878)
Siopelus micans (Klug, 1833)
Siopelus radama (Alluaud, 1932)
Siopelus zambiensis Facchini, 2011
Subgenus Hirpastolus Basilewsky, 1947
Siopelus neomaynei Noonan, 1985
Subgenus Neosiopelus Basilewsky, 1946

Siopelus aethiopicus (Clarke, 1973)
Siopelus amaroides (Basilewsky, 1967)
Siopelus angolensis Facchini, 2021
Siopelus australis Facchini, 2012
Siopelus babaulti (Basilewsky, 1946)
Siopelus basilewskyanus Facchini, 2012
Siopelus basilewskyi (Noonan, 1976)
Siopelus brittoni (Basilewsky, 1946)
Siopelus caffrarius Facchini, 2012
Siopelus calathoides (Dejean, 1829)
Siopelus camerunensis (Basilewsky, 1948)
Siopelus castaneus (Barker, 1922)
Siopelus chisasa Facchini, 2012
Siopelus connexus (Péringuey, 1896)
Siopelus consobrinus (Dejean, 1829)
Siopelus cratericola (Basilewsky, 1962)
Siopelus czeppeli Facchini, 2012
Siopelus decorsei (Jeannel, 1948)
Siopelus fletifer (Dejean, 1829)
Siopelus fuscus (Dejean, 1829)
Siopelus gretae Facchini, 2021
Siopelus guineensis Facchini, 2012
Siopelus irregularis Facchini, 2021
Siopelus irritans (Basilewsky, 1953)
Siopelus jeanneli (Basilewsky, 1948)
Siopelus kenyanus Facchini, 2012
Siopelus kikuyu (Basilewsky, 1948)
Siopelus melancholicus (Boheman, 1848)
Siopelus micros (Jeannel, 1948)
Siopelus nimbanus (Basilewsky, 1950)
Siopelus nyassicus (Basilewsky, 1948)
Siopelus occidentalis Facchini, 2012
Siopelus opaculus Facchini, 2021
Siopelus orientalis Facchini, 2012
Siopelus patruelis (Péringuey, 1898)
Siopelus pediobius (Alluaud, 1927)
Siopelus pseudoopaculus Facchini, 2021
Siopelus pseudopunctatellus Facchini, 2012
Siopelus pseudowrasei Facchini, 2021
Siopelus punctatellus (Reiche, 1850)
Siopelus quadraticollis (Putzeys in Chaudoir, 1878)
Siopelus ruandanus (Basilewsky, 1946)
Siopelus snizeki Facchini, 2012
Siopelus striatopunctatus Facchini, 2012
Siopelus tabularis (Basilewsky, 1948)
Siopelus tanzaniensis Facchini, 2012
Siopelus tenuestriatus (Basilewsky, 1948)
Siopelus transvaalensis Facchini, 2021
Siopelus tshibindensis (Burgeon, 1936)
Siopelus usambaranus (Basilewsky, 1948)
Siopelus wrasei Facchini, 2012
Siopelus wundanyiensis Facchini, 2021
Siopelus zambianus Facchini, 2012

Subgenus Orinophonus Alluaud, 1917
Siopelus hypsinomus (Alluaud, 1917)
Siopelus kilimanus (Alluaud, 1917)
Siopelus malawicus Facchini, 2021
Siopelus oldeanicus (Basilewsky, 1962)
Subgenus Pseudosiopelus Alluaud, 1916

Siopelus barbarae Facchini, 2017
Siopelus biseriatus Facchini & Schüle, 2020
Siopelus exaratus (Klug, 1833)
Siopelus freyi (Basilewsky, 1956)
Siopelus imerinae (Alluaud, 1916)
Siopelus kataevi Facchini, 2017
Siopelus luteoapicalis (Burgeon, 1936)
Siopelus natalicus Péringuey, 1896
Siopelus pallidior (Burgeon, 1936)
Siopelus piceus Facchini, 2017
Siopelus pulchellus (Dejean, 1829)
Siopelus simplex Putzeys in Chaudoir, 1878
Siopelus venustulus (Boheman, 1848)

Subgenus Siopelus Murray, 1859

Siopelus alticola Basilewsky, 1950
Siopelus angustatus (Dejean, 1829)
Siopelus brevitarsis Facchini, 2021
Siopelus bunduki Basilewsky, 1962
Siopelus calabaricus Murray, 1859
Siopelus collarti Basilewsky, 1948
Siopelus crassicornis Burgeon, 1936
Siopelus diatypoides Basilewsky, 1946
Siopelus glabripennis (LaFerté-Sénectère, 1853)
Siopelus hargreavesi Basilewsky, 1948
Siopelus kivuensis Basilewsky, 1948
Siopelus laevicollis N.Ito, 1995
Siopelus leleupi Basilewsky, 1976
Siopelus lineatus Facchini, 2012
Siopelus maynei Burgeon, 1936
Siopelus microcephalus Facchini, 2021
Siopelus pseudopunctiger Facchini, 2012
Siopelus punctiger (Kolbe, 1883)
Siopelus rubrosuturatus (Kuntzen, 1919)
Siopelus tamilnadensis Kataev, 2002
Siopelus usambaraensis Facchini, 2021
