= Pseudoselenophorus =

Scientific classification
- Kingdom: Animalia
- Phylum: Arthropoda
- Class: Insecta
- Order: Coleoptera
- Suborder: Adephaga
- Family: Carabidae
- Tribe: Harpalini
- Subtribe: Harpalina
- Genus: Pseudoselenophorus; Péringuey, 1896
- Species: P. imitator

Binomial name
- Pseudoselenophorus imitator Péringuey, 1896

Species of beetle

Pseudoselenophorus is a genus in the ground beetle family Carabidae. This genus has a single species, Pseudoselenophorus imitator. It is found in the African countries Democratic Republic of the Congo, Mozambique, Zimbabwe, Botswana, Namibia, and South Africa.
