= Dioryche =

Scientific classification
- Domain: Eukaryota
- Kingdom: Animalia
- Phylum: Arthropoda
- Class: Insecta
- Order: Coleoptera
- Suborder: Adephaga
- Family: Carabidae
- Subfamily: Harpalinae
- Tribe: Harpalini
- Subtribe: Harpalina
- Genus: Dioryche; W.S.MacLeay, 1825

Genus of beetles

Dioryche is a genus in the beetle family Carabidae. There are about 19 described species in Dioryche.

== Species ==
These 19 species belong to the genus Dioryche:

- Dioryche cavernosa (Putzeys, 1875) (Indonesia)
- Dioryche chinnada Andrewes, 1921 (Pakistan, Nepal, Sri Lanka, India)
- Dioryche clara Andrewes, 1922 (China, Taiwan, and Vietnam)
- Dioryche convexa Andrewes, 1924 (Nepal and India)
- Dioryche cuprina (Dejean, 1829) (Pakistan, Nepal, Sri Lanka, India)
- Dioryche dravidana Kataev, 2012 (India)
- Dioryche indochinensis (Bates, 1889) (Taiwan, Bhutan, India, Myanmar, Thailand, Laos, Vietnam)
- Dioryche liparops Andrewes, 1933 (Myanmar)
- Dioryche longula (Bates, 1892) (India and Myanmar)
- Dioryche lucidula (Dejean, 1829) (Nepal, Bhutan, and India)
- Dioryche melanauges Andrewes, 1922 (China, Taiwan, Bhutan, Thailand, Vietnam)
- Dioryche nagpurensis (Bates, 1891) (Pakistan, Nepal, Bangladesh, and India)
- Dioryche nitidula Kataev, 2012 (India)
- Dioryche sericea Andrewes, 1922 (China, Taiwan, Sri Lanka, India, Myanmar, Vietnam)
- Dioryche solida Andrewes, 1933 (India)
- Dioryche subrecta Kataev, 2012 (Pakistan, Nepal, and India)
- Dioryche torta (W.S.MacLeay, 1825) (China, Taiwan, Indomalaya)
- Dioryche urszuliki Kataev & Wrase, 2021 (Oman)
- Dioryche yunnana Kataev, 2002 (China)
