= Platymetopsis =

Scientific classification
- Domain: Eukaryota
- Kingdom: Animalia
- Phylum: Arthropoda
- Class: Insecta
- Order: Coleoptera
- Suborder: Adephaga
- Family: Carabidae
- Subfamily: Harpalinae
- Tribe: Harpalini
- Subtribe: Harpalina
- Genus: Platymetopsis; Ball & Maddison, 1987
- Species: P. overali

Binomial name
- Platymetopsis overali Ball & Maddison, 1987

Species of beetle

Platymetopsis is a genus of ground beetles in the family Carabidae. This genus has a single species, Platymetopsis overali. It has been recorded in Brazil.
