= Axinotoma =

Scientific classification
- Kingdom: Animalia
- Phylum: Arthropoda
- Class: Insecta
- Order: Coleoptera
- Suborder: Adephaga
- Family: Carabidae
- Tribe: Harpalini
- Genus: Axinotoma; Dejean, 1829

Genus of beetles

Axinotoma is a genus of beetles in the family Carabidae first described by Pierre François Marie Auguste Dejean in 1829.

== Species ==
Axinotoma contains the following twenty-four species:

- Axinotoma ambigena (Jeannel, 1946)
- Axinotoma bifida Facchini, 2011
- Axinotoma decellei Basilewsky, 1968
- Axinotoma demeyeri Facchini, 2011
- Axinotoma dilatipalpis Facchini, 2011
- Axinotoma fallax Dejean, 1829
- Axinotoma gabonica Facchini, 2017
- Axinotoma hulstaerti Basilewsky, 1950
- Axinotoma kivuensis Facchini, 2011
- Axinotoma latipalpis Basilewsky, 1968
- Axinotoma lepersonneae Burgeon, 1942
- Axinotoma maynei Burgeon, 1936
- Axinotoma morettoi Facchini, 2011
- Axinotoma obtuseangula Peringuey, 1896
- Axinotoma perreiri (Jeannel, 1946)
- Axinotoma posticallis Peringuey, 1896
- Axinotoma pseudofallax Facchini, 2003
- Axinotoma pseudomaynei Facchini, 2017
- Axinotoma schuelei Facchini, 2011
- Axinotoma sinuaticollis Facchini, 2011
- Axinotoma sinuatipennis Facchini, 2011
- Axinotoma tanzaniana Facchini, 2003
- Axinotoma toledanoi Facchini, 2011
- Axinotoma viossati Sciaky & Toledano, 1995
