= Panagrius =

Scientific classification
- Domain: Eukaryota
- Kingdom: Animalia
- Phylum: Arthropoda
- Class: Insecta
- Order: Coleoptera
- Suborder: Adephaga
- Family: Carabidae
- Subfamily: Harpalinae
- Tribe: Harpalini
- Subtribe: Harpalina
- Genus: Panagrius; Andrewes, 1933

Species of beetle

Panagrius is a genus in the beetle family Carabidae. There are at least two described species in Panagrius.

== Species ==
These two species belong to the genus Panagrius:

- Panagrius hystrix Andrewes, 1933 (India)
- Panagrius nigricans (N.Ito, 1996) (India)
