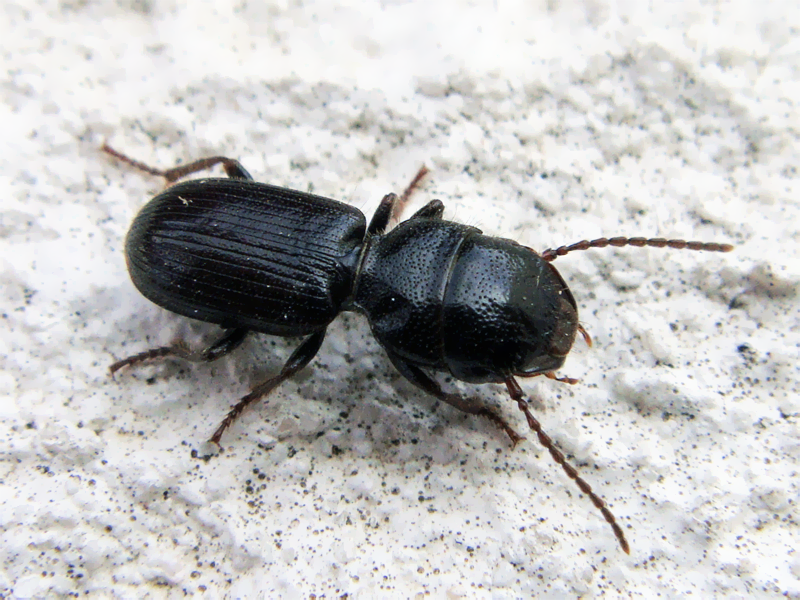
- Dixus sphaerocephalus

Scientific classification
- Domain: Eukaryota
- Kingdom: Animalia
- Phylum: Arthropoda
- Class: Insecta
- Order: Coleoptera
- Suborder: Adephaga
- Family: Carabidae
- Subfamily: Harpalinae
- Tribe: Harpalini
- Subtribe: Ditomina
- Genus: Dixus; Billberg, 1820

= Dixus =

Genus of beetles

Dixus is a genus in the beetle family Carabidae. There are about 11 described species in Dixus.

== Species ==
These 11 species belong to the genus Dixus:

- Dixus capito (Audinet-Serville, 1821)
- Dixus clypeatus (P.Rossi, 1790)
- Dixus eremita (Dejean, 1825)
- Dixus genohensis Azadbakhsh & Kirschenhofer, 2018
- Dixus infans (Abeille de Perrin, 1909)
- Dixus interruptus (Fabricius, 1775)
- Dixus klapperichi (Jedlicka, 1964)
- Dixus moloch (Piochard de la Brûlerie, 1873)
- Dixus obscurus (Dejean, 1825)
- Dixus semicylindricus (Piochard de la Brûlerie, 1872)
- Dixus sphaerocephalus (Olivier, 1795)
