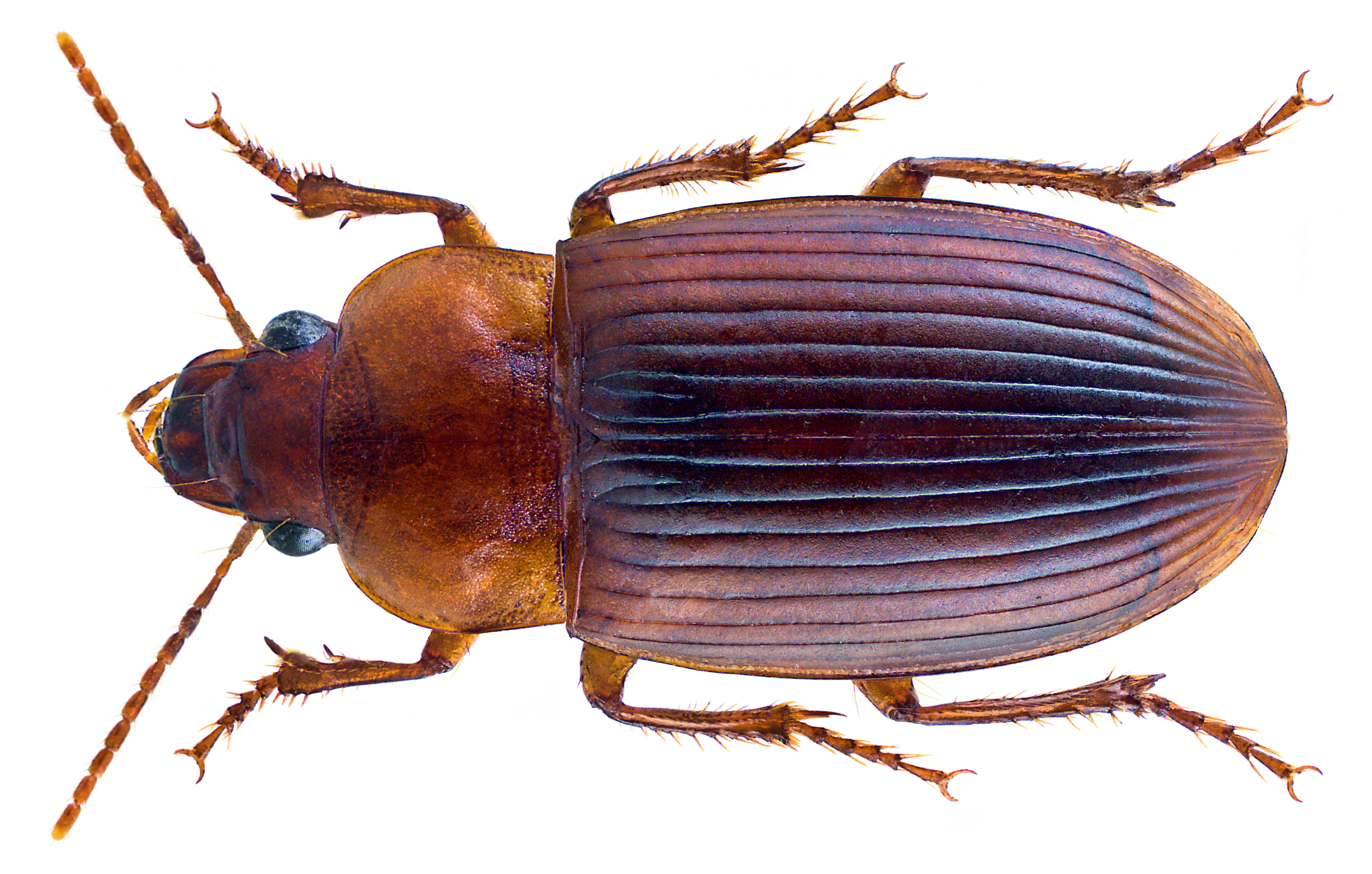
- Ooidius crassiceps

Scientific classification
- Domain: Eukaryota
- Kingdom: Animalia
- Phylum: Arthropoda
- Class: Insecta
- Order: Coleoptera
- Suborder: Adephaga
- Family: Carabidae
- Subfamily: Harpalinae
- Tribe: Harpalini
- Subtribe: Harpalina
- Genus: Ooidius; Chaudoir, 1847

= Ooidius =

Genus of beetles

Ooidius is a genus in the beetle family Carabidae. There are about five described species in Ooidius.

== Species ==
These five species belong to the genus Ooidius:

- Ooidius advolans (Nietner, 1856) (Sri Lanka and India)
- Ooidius crassiceps G.Müller, 1942 (Kenya and Tanzania)
- Ooidius dorsiger (Klug, 1853) (Africa)
- Ooidius ephippium (Dejean, 1829) (Africa)
- Ooidius madecassus (Jeannel, 1948) (Madagascar)
