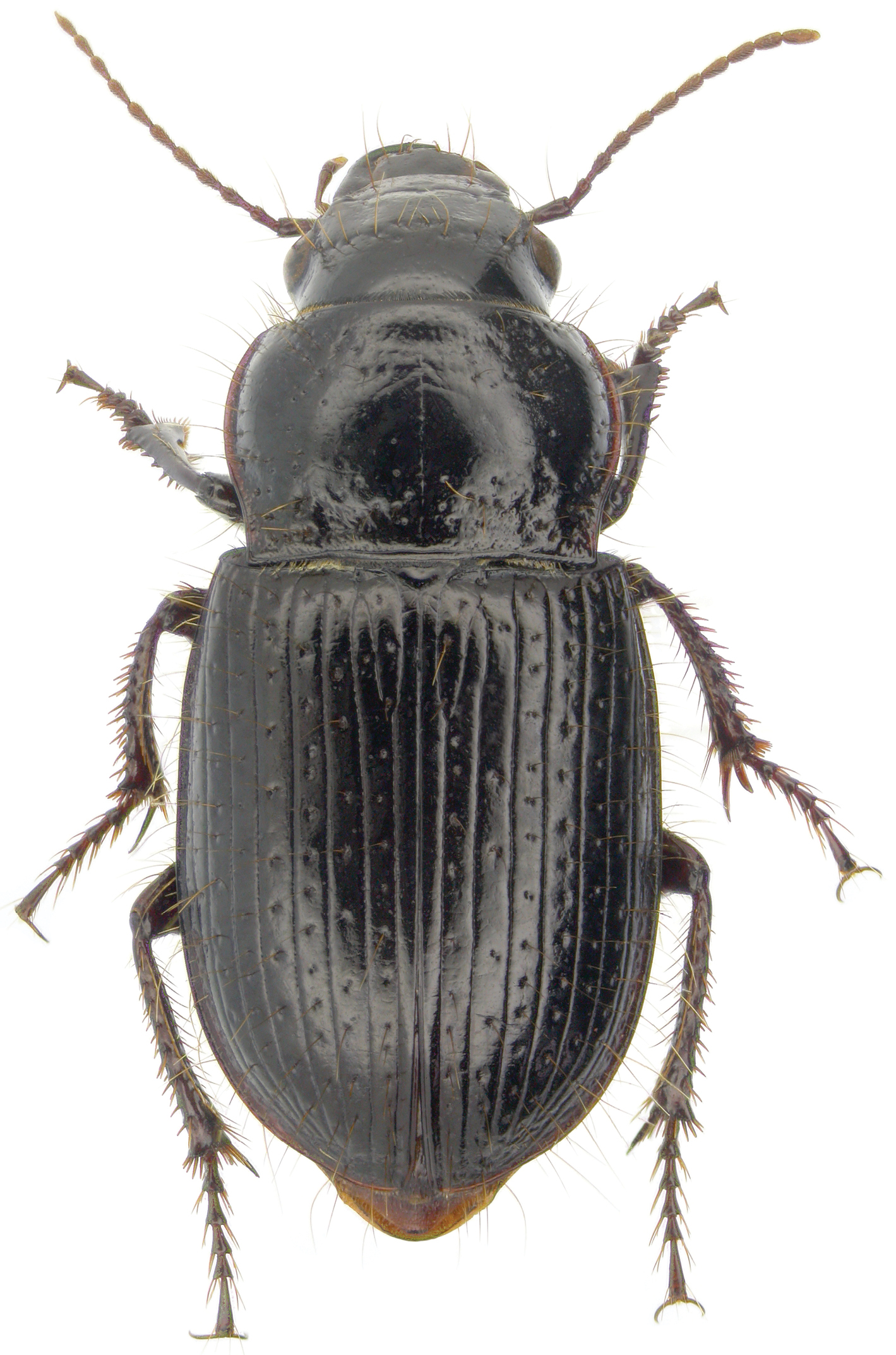

Scientific classification
- Kingdom: Animalia
- Phylum: Arthropoda
- Class: Insecta
- Order: Coleoptera
- Suborder: Adephaga
- Family: Carabidae
- Tribe: Harpalini
- Subtribe: Harpalina
- Genus: Piosoma; LeConte, 1848
- Species: P. setosum

Binomial name
- Piosoma setosum LeConte, 1848

Synonyms
- Piosoma setosa

= Piosoma =

Piosoma setosum

Species of beetle

Piosoma setosum is a species of beetle in the family Carabidae, the only species in the genus Piosoma. It is found in North America.
