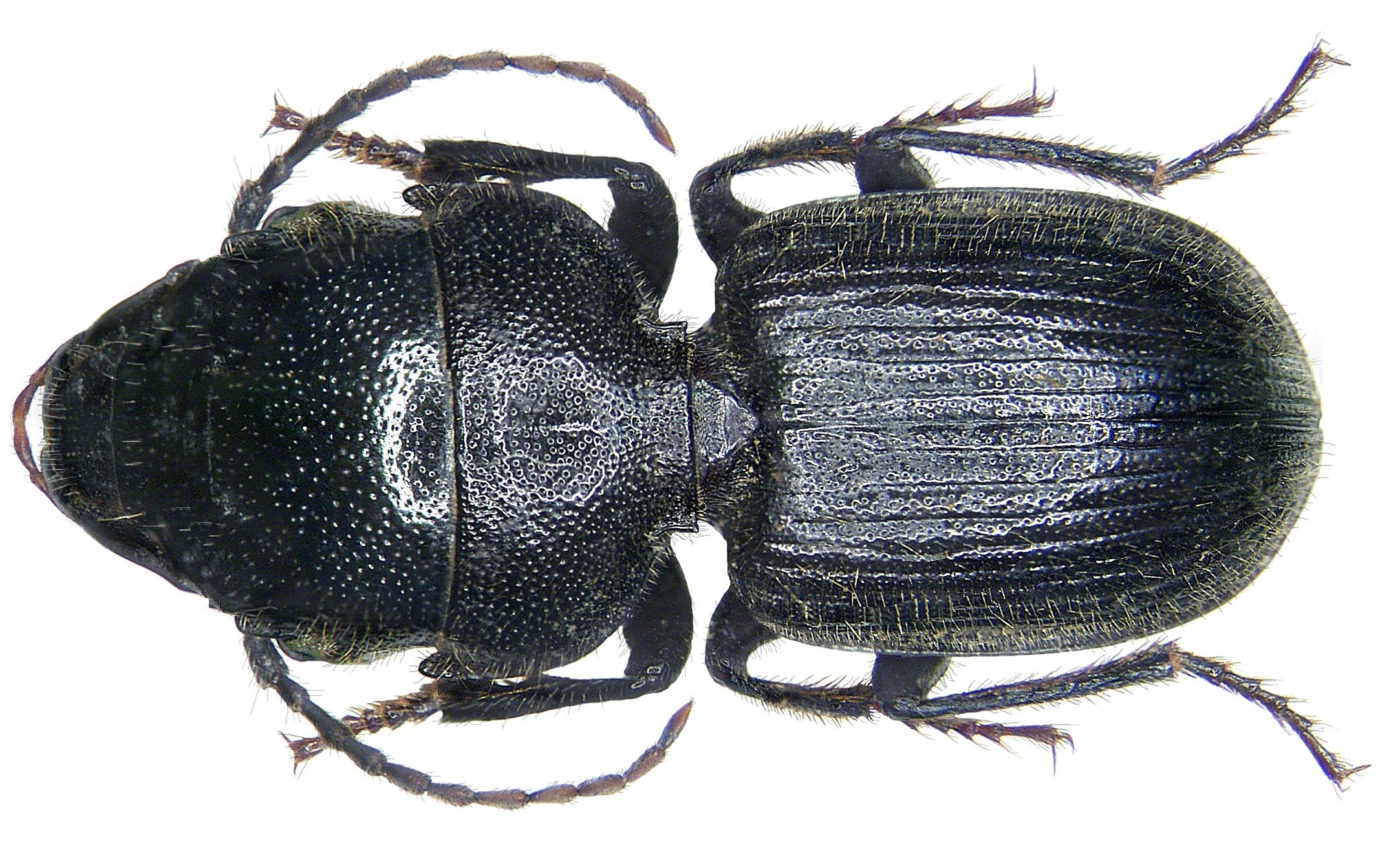
- Ditomus sp.

Scientific classification
- Domain: Eukaryota
- Kingdom: Animalia
- Phylum: Arthropoda
- Class: Insecta
- Order: Coleoptera
- Suborder: Adephaga
- Family: Carabidae
- Subfamily: Harpalinae
- Tribe: Harpalini
- Subtribe: Ditomina
- Genus: Ditomus; Bonelli, 1810

Synonyms
- Aristus Latreille, 1816; Curretis Gistel, 1848; Ditomus Dejean, 1825; Euditomus Acloque, 1895; Sabienus Gozis, 1882

= Ditomus =

Genus of beetles

Ditomus is a genus in the ground beetle family Carabidae. There are at least two described species in Ditomus, found in the Palearctic.

== Species ==
These two species belong to the genus Ditomus:

- Ditomus calydonius (P.Rossi, 1790)
- Ditomus tricuspidatus (Fabricius, 1792)
