= Ectinothorax =

Scientific classification
- Domain: Eukaryota
- Kingdom: Animalia
- Phylum: Arthropoda
- Class: Insecta
- Order: Coleoptera
- Suborder: Adephaga
- Family: Carabidae
- Subfamily: Harpalinae
- Tribe: Harpalini
- Subtribe: Harpalina
- Genus: Ectinothorax; Alluaud, 1941

Genus of beetles

Ectinothorax is a genus in the beetle family Carabidae. There are about six described species in Ectinothorax, found in Madagascar.

== Species ==
These six species belong to the genus Ectinothorax:

- Ectinothorax assimilis (Fairmaire, 1903)
- Ectinothorax feronioides Alluaud, 1941
- Ectinothorax longicollis Jeannel, 1948
- Ectinothorax mathiauxi Jeannel, 1948
- Ectinothorax sulcator (Fairmaire, 1903)
- Ectinothorax vadoni Jeannel, 1948
