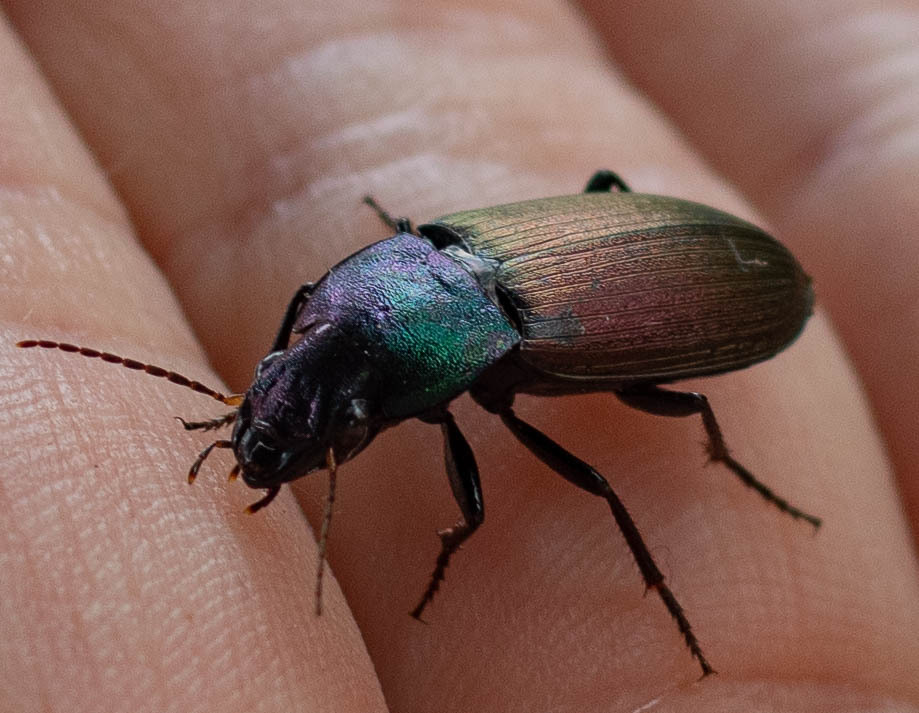
- Neoaulacoryssus speciosus, Brasil

Scientific classification
- Domain: Eukaryota
- Kingdom: Animalia
- Phylum: Arthropoda
- Class: Insecta
- Order: Coleoptera
- Suborder: Adephaga
- Family: Carabidae
- Subfamily: Harpalinae
- Tribe: Harpalini
- Subtribe: Harpalina
- Genus: Neoaulacoryssus; Noonan, 1985

= Neoaulacoryssus =

Genus of beetles

Neoaulacoryssus is a genus in the ground beetle family Carabidae. There are at least two described species in Neoaulacoryssus.

== Species ==
These two species belong to the genus Neoaulacoryssus:

- Neoaulacoryssus cupripennis (Gory, 1833) (Lesser Antilles, Colombia, French Guiana)
- Neoaulacoryssus speciosus (Dejean, 1829) (Brazil)
