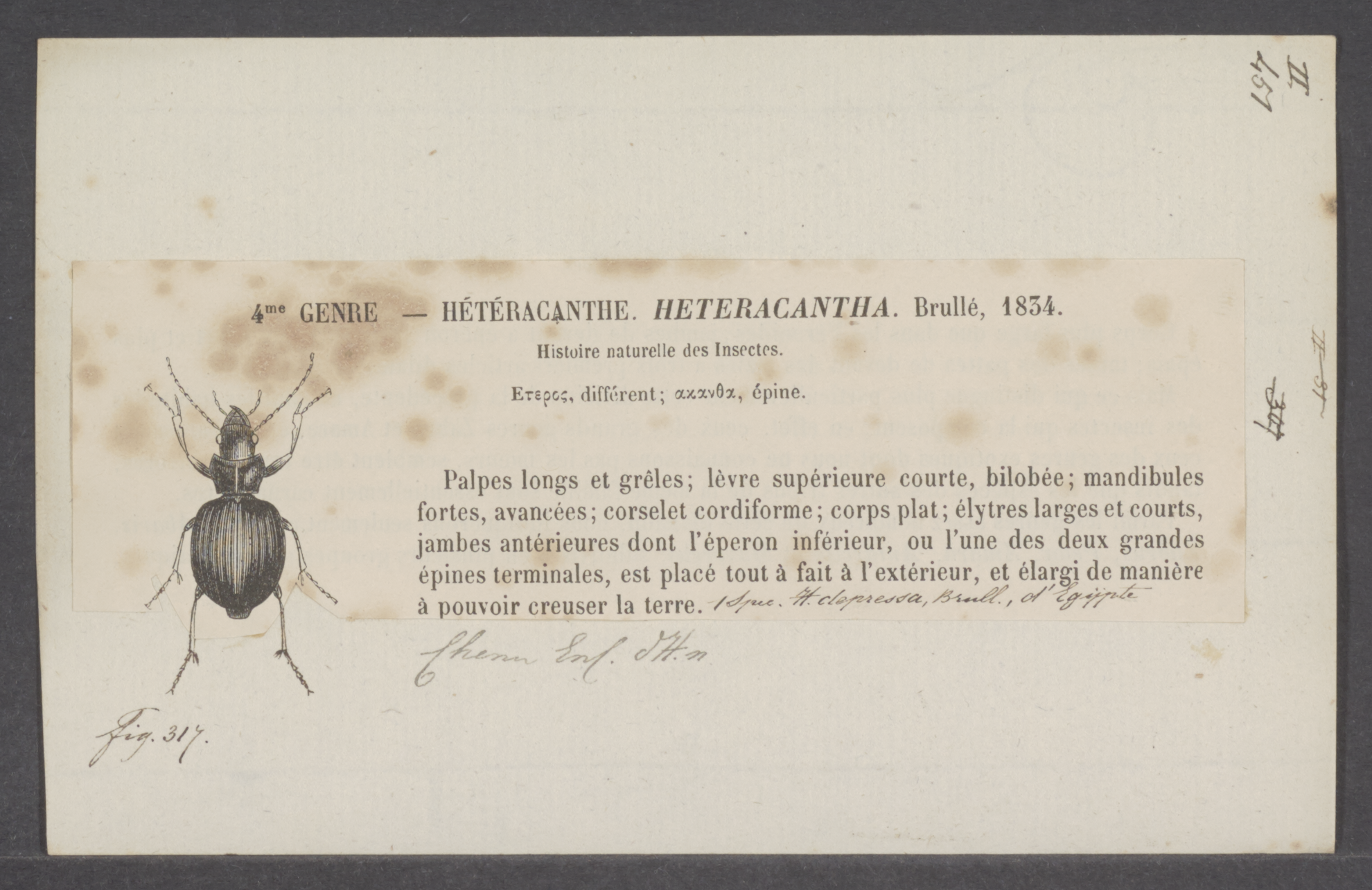

Scientific classification
- Kingdom: Animalia
- Phylum: Arthropoda
- Class: Insecta
- Order: Coleoptera
- Suborder: Adephaga
- Family: Carabidae
- Subfamily: Harpalinae
- Tribe: Harpalini
- Subtribe: Harpalina
- Genus: Heteracantha; Brullé, 1835
- Species: H. depressa

Binomial name
- Heteracantha depressa Brullé, 1835

Synonyms
- Plateoditomus Gistel, 1856

= Heteracantha =

Species of beetle

Heteracantha is a genus of carabids in the beetle family Carabidae. This genus has a single species, Heteracantha depressa. It is found in North Africa and southwest Asia.
