= Paulianoscirtus =

Scientific classification
- Domain: Eukaryota
- Kingdom: Animalia
- Phylum: Arthropoda
- Class: Insecta
- Order: Coleoptera
- Suborder: Adephaga
- Family: Carabidae
- Subfamily: Harpalinae
- Tribe: Harpalini
- Subtribe: Harpalina
- Genus: Paulianoscirtus; Basilewsky, 1976

Genus of beetles

Paulianoscirtus is a genus in the ground beetle family Carabidae. There are at least two described species in Paulianoscirtus, found in Madagascar.

== Species ==
These two species belong to the genus Paulianoscirtus:

- Paulianoscirtus cordicollis Basilewsky, 1976
- Paulianoscirtus madecassus Basilewsky, 1976
