= Allosiopelus =

Scientific classification
- Domain: Eukaryota
- Kingdom: Animalia
- Phylum: Arthropoda
- Class: Insecta
- Order: Coleoptera
- Suborder: Adephaga
- Family: Carabidae
- Subfamily: Harpalinae
- Tribe: Harpalini
- Subtribe: Harpalina
- Genus: Allosiopelus; N.Ito, 1995

Genus of beetles

Allosiopelus is a genus in the beetle family Carabidae. There are at least two described species in Allosiopelus.

== Species ==
These two species belong to the genus Allosiopelus:

- Allosiopelus fulvicollis N.Ito, 2016 (India)
- Allosiopelus punctatipennis N.Ito, 1995 (India)
