= Oedesis =

Scientific classification
- Kingdom: Animalia
- Phylum: Arthropoda
- Class: Insecta
- Order: Coleoptera
- Suborder: Adephaga
- Family: Carabidae
- Subfamily: Harpalinae
- Tribe: Harpalini
- Subtribe: Ditomina
- Genus: Oedesis; Motschulsky, 1850

Synonyms
- Eriocypas Tschitscherine, 1901; Eriotomus Piochard de la Brûlerie, 1873

Genus of beetles

Oedesis is a genus in the ground beetle family Carabidae. There are about seven described species in Oedesis, found in the (Palearctic).

== Species ==
These seven species belong to the genus Oedesis:

- Oedesis caucasicus (Dejean, 1831) (Palearctic)
- Oedesis cyprius Wrase, 1999 (Cyprus)
- Oedesis kryzhanovskii Wrase, 1999 (Israel, Turkey)
- Oedesis obscurior (Pic, 1911) (Jordan)
- Oedesis palaestinus (Piochard de la Brûlerie, 1873) (Israel, Turkey, Cyprus)
- Oedesis tomentosus (Dejean, 1831) (Spain, Morocco, Algeria)
- Oedesis villosulus (Reiche, 1860) (Portugal, Spain, Italy, Greece, Morocco, Algeria, Tunisia)
