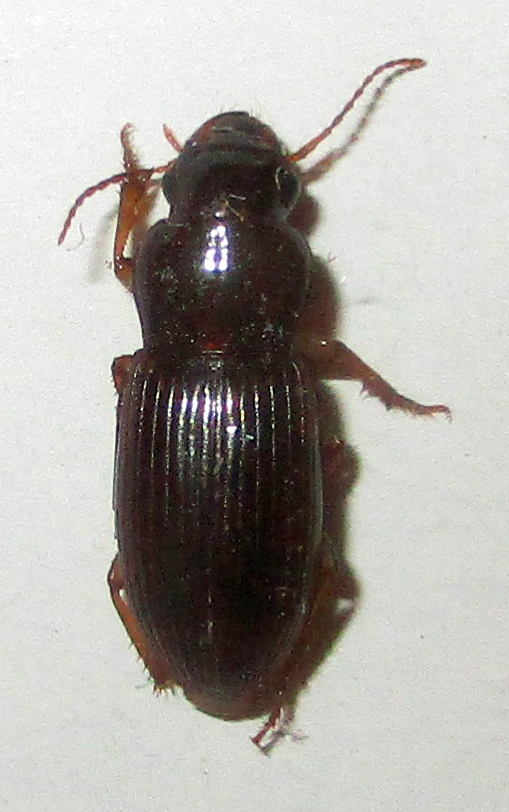
- Omostropus, Botswana

Scientific classification
- Kingdom: Animalia
- Phylum: Arthropoda
- Class: Insecta
- Order: Coleoptera
- Suborder: Adephaga
- Family: Carabidae
- Subfamily: Harpalinae
- Tribe: Harpalini
- Subtribe: Harpalina
- Genus: Omostropus; Péringuey, 1896

= Omostropus =

Genus of beetles

Omostropus is a genus in the ground beetle family Carabidae. There are about eight described species in Omostropus, found in Africa.

== Species ==
These eight species belong to the genus Omostropus:

- Omostropus australis Basilewsky, 1946 (South Africa)
- Omostropus cratognathoides (Chaudoir, 1876) (Kenya)
- Omostropus kilimanus Basilewsky, 1946 (Kenya, Tanzania)
- Omostropus mandibularis (Roth, 1851) (Africa)
- Omostropus minor Basilewsky, 1948 (Namibia, South Africa)
- Omostropus similis Péringuey, 1896 (Botswana)
- Omostropus tersulus Péringuey, 1896 (Zimbabwe, South Africa)
- Omostropus vicarius Péringuey, 1896 (Mozambique, Zimbabwe, South Africa)
