= Selenotichnus =

Scientific classification
- Domain: Eukaryota
- Kingdom: Animalia
- Phylum: Arthropoda
- Class: Insecta
- Order: Coleoptera
- Suborder: Adephaga
- Family: Carabidae
- Subfamily: Harpalinae
- Tribe: Harpalini
- Subtribe: Harpalina
- Genus: Selenotichnus; Kataev, 1999

Genus of beetles

Selenotichnus is a genus in the ground beetle family Carabidae. There are at least three described species in Selenotichnus, found in China.

== Species ==
These three species belong to the genus Selenotichnus:

- Selenotichnus klapkai Kataev & Wrase, 2006
- Selenotichnus olegi Kataev, 1999
- Selenotichnus parvulus Kataev & Wrase, 2006
