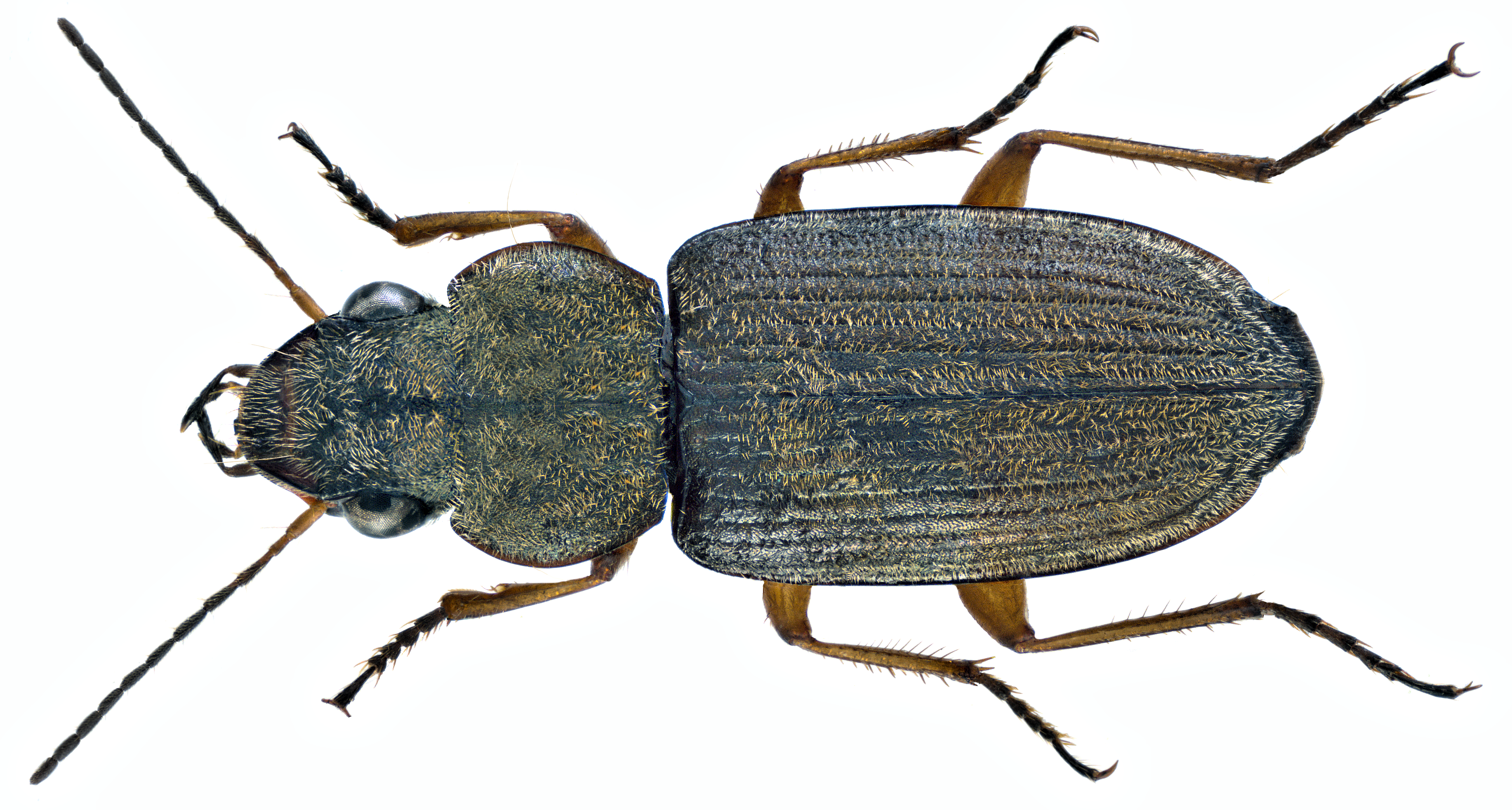
- Platymetopus vestitus

Scientific classification
- Kingdom: Animalia
- Phylum: Arthropoda
- Class: Insecta
- Order: Coleoptera
- Suborder: Adephaga
- Family: Carabidae
- Subfamily: Harpalinae
- Tribe: Harpalini
- Subtribe: Harpalina
- Genus: Platymetopus; Dejean, 1829

= Platymetopus =

Genus of beetles

Platymetopus is a genus in the beetle family Carabidae. There are more than 30 described species in Platymetopus, found mainly in Africa and southern Asia.

== Species ==
These 35 species belong to the genus Platymetopus:

- Platymetopus brevilabris LaFerté-Sénectère, 1853
- Platymetopus colpophilus Alluaud, 1918
- Platymetopus congestulus Basilewsky, 1948
- Platymetopus crenulatus Chaudoir, 1878
- Platymetopus cribricollis Facchini, 2004
- Platymetopus curtulus (Péringuey, 1908)
- Platymetopus cyaneus Facchini, 2004
- Platymetopus diversepunctatus Facchini, 2004
- Platymetopus figuratus Boheman, 1848
- Platymetopus flavilabris (Fabricius, 1798)
- Platymetopus guineensis Dejean, 1831
- Platymetopus interpunctatus Dejean, 1829
- Platymetopus keiseri Louwerens, 1956
- Platymetopus laticeps Dejean, 1829
- Platymetopus lepidus Dejean, 1829
- Platymetopus ludificus (Kolbe, 1883)
- Platymetopus majusculus Lorenz, 1998
- Platymetopus obscuripes Chaudoir, 1878
- Platymetopus platythorax Basilewsky, 1948
- Platymetopus pseudocrenulatus Facchini, 2016
- Platymetopus quadrimaculatus Dejean, 1829
- Platymetopus quadrinotatus Burgeon, 1936
- Platymetopus rectangularis Burgeon, 1936
- Platymetopus rugosus (Nietner, 1857)
- Platymetopus sakalava Jeannel, 1948
- Platymetopus schoenherri Dejean, 1831
- Platymetopus seriatus Chaudoir, 1878
- Platymetopus straeleni Basilewsky, 1947
- Platymetopus subrugosus Schauberger, 1938
- Platymetopus sudanicus Basilewsky, 1967
- Platymetopus tessellatus Dejean, 1829
- Platymetopus tibialis (Kolbe, 1883)
- Platymetopus tritus Bates, 1889
- Platymetopus vestitus Dejean, 1829
- Platymetopus xanthographus (Alluaud, 1916)
