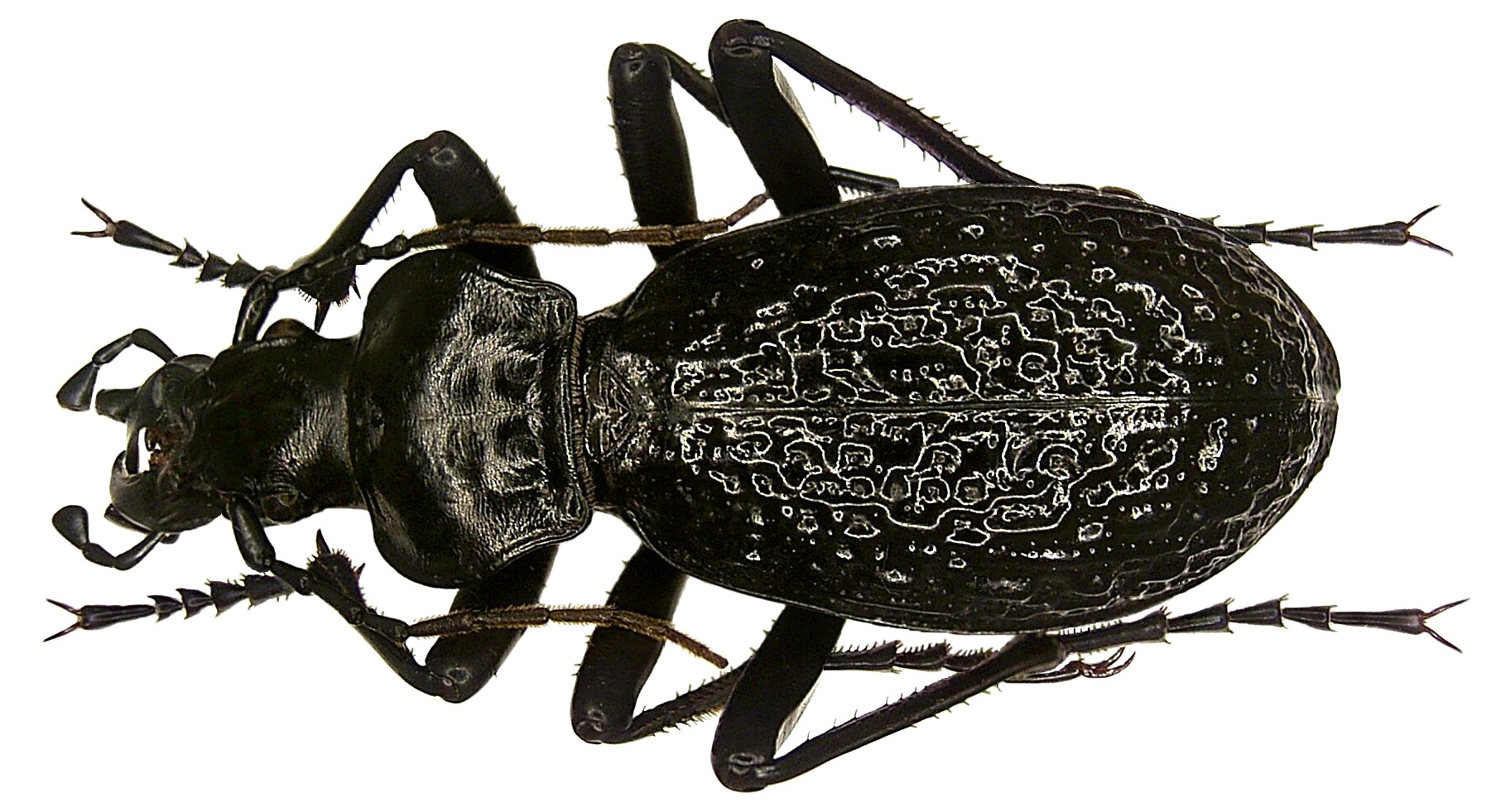

Scientific classification
- Kingdom: Animalia
- Phylum: Arthropoda
- Class: Insecta
- Order: Coleoptera
- Suborder: Adephaga
- Family: Carabidae
- Tribe: Harpalini
- Subtribe: Amblystomina
- Genus: Barysomus; Dejean, 1829

= Barysomus =

Genus of beetles

Barysomus is a genus of beetles in the family Carabidae, containing the following species:

- Barysomus argentinus Lutshnik, 1934
- Barysomus cayennensis Laporte de Castelnau, 1832
- Barysomus cephalotes Erichson, 1848
- Barysomus hoepfneri Dejean, 1829
- Barysomus metallicus Reiche, 1843
- Barysomus punctatostriatus Emden, 1949
