= Neohyparpalus =

Scientific classification
- Domain: Eukaryota
- Kingdom: Animalia
- Phylum: Arthropoda
- Class: Insecta
- Order: Coleoptera
- Suborder: Adephaga
- Family: Carabidae
- Subfamily: Harpalinae
- Tribe: Harpalini
- Subtribe: Harpalina
- Genus: Neohyparpalus; Clarke, 1981
- Species: N. parcepunctatus

Binomial name
- Neohyparpalus parcepunctatus (Basilewsky, 1949)

Species of beetle

Neohyparpalus parcepunctatus is a species of beetle in the family Carabidae, the only species in the genus Neohyparpalus.
