= Trichoxycentrus =

Trichoxycentrus rugiceps

Scientific classification
- Kingdom: Animalia
- Phylum: Arthropoda
- Class: Insecta
- Order: Coleoptera
- Suborder: Adephaga
- Family: Carabidae
- Subfamily: Harpalinae
- Genus: Trichoxycentrus; N. Ito, 2000
- Species: T. rugiceps

Binomial name
- Trichoxycentrus rugiceps N. Ito, 2000

Species of beetle

Trichoxycentrus rugiceps is a species of beetle in the family Carabidae, the only species in the genus Trichoxycentrus.
