= Afromizonus =

Scientific classification
- Kingdom: Animalia
- Phylum: Arthropoda
- Class: Insecta
- Order: Coleoptera
- Suborder: Adephaga
- Family: Carabidae
- Subfamily: Harpalinae
- Genus: Afromizonus; Basilewsky, 1947

Genus of beetles

Afromizonus is a genus of beetles in the family Carabidae, containing the following species:

- Afromizonus ruber Basilewsky, 1950
- Afromizonus tecospilus Basilewsky, 1947
- Afromizonus voltae Basilewsky, 1946
