= Bronislavia =

Scientific classification
- Kingdom: Animalia
- Phylum: Arthropoda
- Class: Insecta
- Order: Coleoptera
- Suborder: Adephaga
- Family: Carabidae
- Subfamily: Harpalinae
- Genus: Bronislavia; Semenov, 1891

Genus of beetles

Bronislavia is a genus of beetles in the family Carabidae, containing the following species:

- Bronislavia kryzhanovskii Mikhailov, 1970
- Bronislavia lopatini Mikhailov, 1970
- Bronislavia robusta Semenov, 1891
