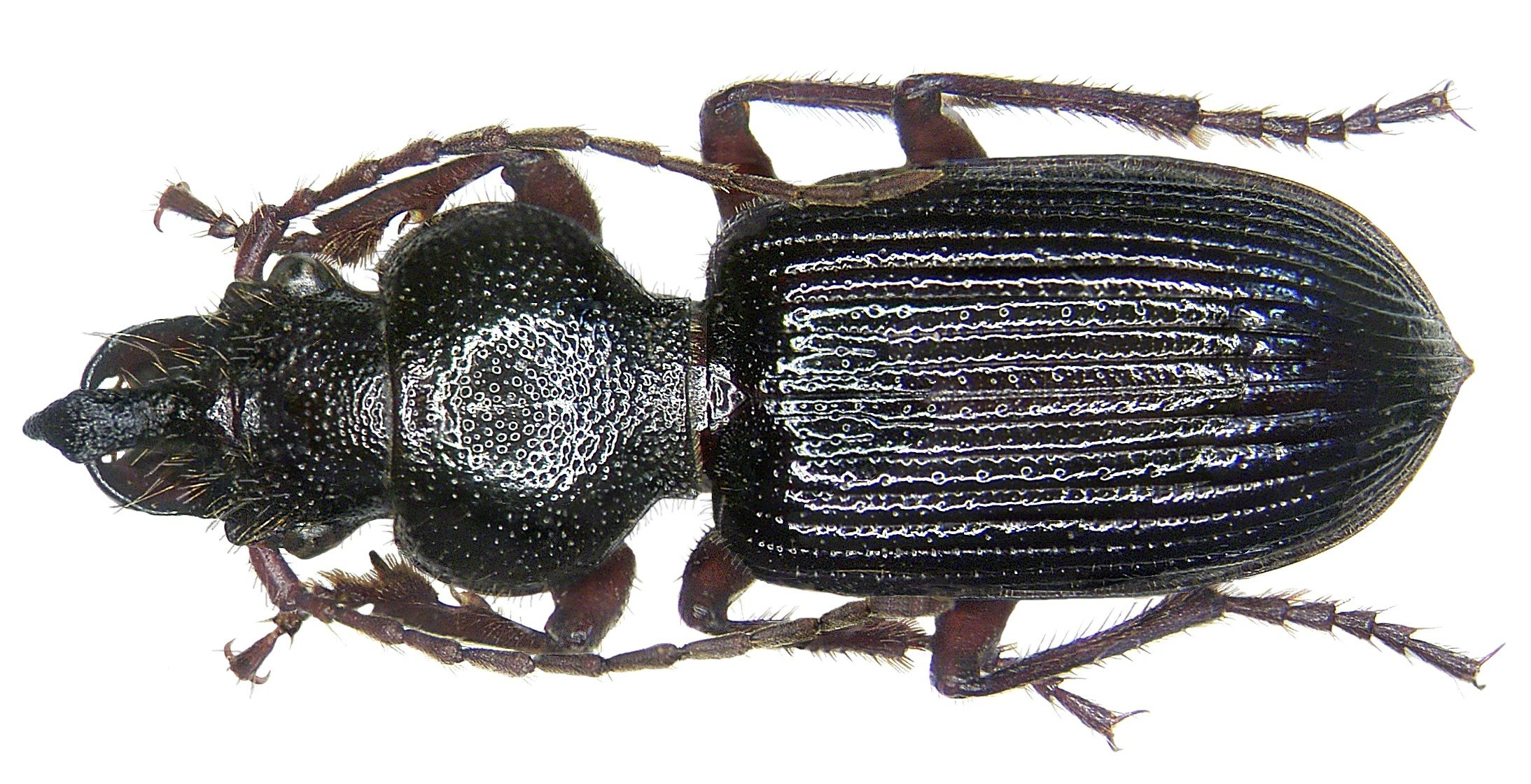
- Carterus tricuspidatus

Scientific classification
- Kingdom: Animalia
- Phylum: Arthropoda
- Class: Insecta
- Order: Coleoptera
- Suborder: Adephaga
- Family: Carabidae
- Subfamily: Harpalinae
- Genus: Carterus; Dana, 1851

= Carterus =

Genus of beetles

Carterus is a genus of beetles in the family Carabidae, containing the following species:

- Carterus angustipennis (Chaudoir, 1852)
- Carterus angustus (Menetries, 1832)
- Carterus boschi Schauberger, 1934
- Carterus cribratus (Reiche & Saulcy, 1855)
- Carterus dama (P.Rossi, 1792)
- Carterus depressus (Brulle, 1832)
- Carterus fulvipes (Latreille, 1817)
- Carterus gilvipes (Piochard De La Brulerie, 1873)
- Carterus gracilis Rambur, 1837
- Carterus interceptus Dejean, 1830
- Carterus lefebvrei (Brulle, 1832)
- Carterus microcephalus Rambur, 1837
- Carterus neglectus Wrase, 1994
- Carterus rotundicollis Rambur, 1837
- Carterus rufipes (Chaudoir, 1843)
- Carterus validiusculus Brulerie, 1873
