= Bleusea =

Scientific classification
- Kingdom: Animalia
- Phylum: Arthropoda
- Class: Insecta
- Order: Coleoptera
- Suborder: Adephaga
- Family: Carabidae
- Subfamily: Harpalinae
- Genus: Bleusea; Bedel, 1897

Genus of beetles

Bleusea is a genus of beetles in the family Carabidae, containing the following species:

- Bleusea ammophila Tschitscherine, 1898
- Bleusea deserticola Bedel, 1897
