= Typsiharpalus =

Scientific classification
- Domain: Eukaryota
- Kingdom: Animalia
- Phylum: Arthropoda
- Class: Insecta
- Order: Coleoptera
- Suborder: Adephaga
- Family: Carabidae
- Genus: Typsiharpalus; Tschitscherine, 1901

Genus of beetles

Typsiharpalus is a genus of beetles in the family Carabidae, containing the following species:

- Typsiharpalus azruensis Antoine, 1925
- Typsiharpalus bonvouloiri (Vuillefroy, 1866)
- Typsiharpalus punctatipennis (Rambur, 1838)
