= Trichopselaphus =

Scientific classification
- Kingdom: Animalia
- Phylum: Arthropoda
- Class: Insecta
- Order: Coleoptera
- Suborder: Adephaga
- Family: Carabidae
- Subfamily: Harpalinae
- Genus: Trichopselaphus; Chaudoir, 1843

Genus of beetles

Trichopselaphus is a genus of beetles in the family Carabidae, containing the following species:

- Trichopselaphus erwinorum Ball, 1978
- Trichopselaphus gloriosus Ball, 1978
- Trichopselaphus magnificus Ball, 1978
- Trichopselaphus meyeri Ball, 1978
- Trichopselaphus minor Bates, 1882
- Trichopselaphus stockwelli Ball, 1987
- Trichopselaphus subiridescens Chaudoir, 1843
- Trichopselaphus woldai Ball, 1987
