= Tschitscherinellus =

Scientific classification
- Kingdom: Animalia
- Phylum: Arthropoda
- Class: Insecta
- Order: Coleoptera
- Suborder: Adephaga
- Family: Carabidae
- Subfamily: Harpalinae
- Genus: Tschitscherinellus; Csiki, 1906

Genus of beetles

Tschitscherinellus is a genus of beetles in the family Carabidae, containing the following species:

- Tschitscherinellus cordatus (Dejean, 1825)
- Tschitscherinellus oxygonus (Chaudoir, 1850)
