= Anomostomus =

Scientific classification
- Kingdom: Animalia
- Phylum: Arthropoda
- Class: Insecta
- Order: Coleoptera
- Suborder: Adephaga
- Family: Carabidae
- Subfamily: Harpalinae
- Genus: Anomostomus; Laferte-Senectere, 1853

Genus of beetles

Anomostomus is a genus of beetles in the family Carabidae, containing the following species:

- Anomostomus laevigatus (Kuntzen, 1919)
- Anomostomus orientalis Andrewes, 1923
- Anomostomus torridus Laferte-Senectere, 1853
