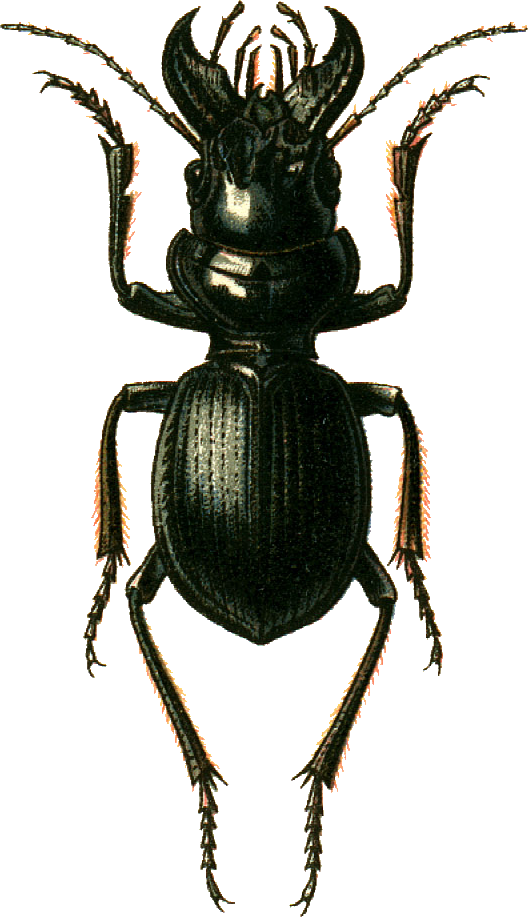
- Machozetus lehmanni

Scientific classification
- Kingdom: Animalia
- Phylum: Arthropoda
- Clade: Pancrustacea
- Class: Insecta
- Order: Coleoptera
- Suborder: Adephaga
- Family: Carabidae
- Subfamily: Harpalinae
- Genus: Machozetus; Chaudoir, 1850

= Machozetus =

Genus of beetles

Machozetus is a genus of beetles in the family Carabidae, containing the following species:

- Machozetus concinnus C.A. Daohrn, 1885
- Machozetus lehmanni Menetries, 1848
