= List of Tachys species =

These 273 species belong to Tachys, a genus of ground beetles in the family Carabidae.

== Tachys species ==
- Tachys aaa (Liebherr, 2021)
- Tachys abruptus Darlington, 1934
- Tachys aeneipennis Motschulsky, 1862
- Tachys aequinoctialis (Motschulsky, 1855)
- Tachys albipes LeConte, 1863
- Tachys algiricus (Lucas, 1846)
- Tachys ambulatus Darlington, 1962
- Tachys androyanus (Jeannel, 1946)
- Tachys angustulus Reitter, 1899
- Tachys apex Darlington, 1962
- Tachys arcanicola Blackburn, 1878
- Tachys arculus Fauvel, 1882
- Tachys argentinicus Csiki, 1928
- Tachys artensis (Montrouzier, 1860)
- Tachys asemus (Basilewsky, 1968)
- Tachys assamicus (Jedlicka, 1964)
- Tachys atamuradovi Kryzhanovskij & Mikhailov, 1987
- Tachys atomarius Wollaston, 1867
- Tachys atomus Blackburn, 1878
- Tachys atridermis Sloane, 1921
- Tachys austinicus (Casey, 1918)
- Tachys australicus Sloane, 1896
- Tachys avius Darlington, 1962
- Tachys baldiensis Blackburn, 1891
- Tachys barbieri Straneo, 1953
- Tachys bathyglyptus Andrewes, 1925
- Tachys beatus Darlington, 1962
- Tachys beaumonti Casey, 1918
- Tachys bicoloratus Burgeon, 1935
- Tachys bistriatus (Duftschmid, 1812)
- Tachys blackburni Sloane, 1921
- Tachys blemoides (Jeannel, 1946)
- Tachys bloetei Andrewes, 1930
- Tachys bolellus Darlington, 1962
- Tachys bolus Darlington, 1962
- Tachys bonariensis Steinheil, 1869
- Tachys borkuensis (Bruneau de Miré, 1952)
- Tachys bouchardi Andrewes, 1931
- Tachys brachys Andrewes, 1925
- Tachys bradycellinus Hayward, 1900
- Tachys bredoi (Basilewsky, 1953)
- Tachys brevicornis (Chaudoir, 1846)
- Tachys brunneus Andrewes, 1925
- Tachys brunniceps Andrewes, 1930
- Tachys bryanti Lindroth, 1966
- Tachys bunyaensis Baehr, 2017
- Tachys caffer Péringuey, 1896
- Tachys caheni (Basilewsky, 1972)
- Tachys caledonicus Csiki, 1928
- Tachys callipygus (Boheman, 1858)
- Tachys cameroni Andrewes, 1925
- Tachys captus Blackburn, 1888
- Tachys cardoni Andrewes, 1925
- Tachys carib Darlington, 1936
- Tachys carinulatus Sloane, 1921
- Tachys castaneicolor Bates, 1882
- Tachys centralis J.Sahlberg, 1900
- Tachys centriustatus Reitter in F.Hauser, 1894
- Tachys centromaculatus Wollaston, 1864
- Tachys chiriquinus Bates, 1882
- Tachys cinctus Putzeys, 1875
- Tachys collardi (Basilewsky, 1955)
- Tachys colonicus Casey, 1918
- Tachys columbiensis Hayward, 1900
- Tachys corax LeConte, 1852
- Tachys coriaceus Broun, 1908
- Tachys crypticola (Britton, 1960)
- Tachys cubax Darlington, 1934
- Tachys curtulus (Basilewsky, 1953)
- Tachys cycloderus Bates, 1871
- Tachys cyprius Coulon, 2004
- Tachys delamarei (Jeannel, 1962)
- Tachys delicatus Andrewes, 1925
- Tachys dentatus Andrewes, 1925
- Tachys descarpentriesi (Bruneau de Miré, 1965)
- Tachys devroeyi Burgeon, 1935
- Tachys dimediatus Motschulsky, 1849
- Tachys diminutus Bates, 1871
- Tachys diploharpinus Bates, 1878
- Tachys discipennis Fauvel, 1882
- Tachys dominicanus Darlington, 1934
- Tachys dorsalis Motschulsky, 1851
- Tachys dostali Baehr, 2014
- Tachys dromioides Bates, 1871
- Tachys dzosonicus Pawlowski, 1974
- Tachys ectromioides Sloane, 1896
- Tachys edax LeConte, 1852
- Tachys ellenbergeri (Bruneau de Miré, 1964)
- Tachys elongatulus (Dejean, 1831)
- Tachys endroedyi Baehr, 2017
- Tachys enormis (Dostal, 2015)
- Tachys erwini Reichardt, 1976
- Tachys euryodes Bates, 1892
- Tachys excisicollis Baehr, 2012
- Tachys exochrias Darlington, 1962
- Tachys fasciatus (Motschulsky, 1851)
- Tachys federicae Baehr, 2016
- Tachys filax Darlington, 1934
- Tachys flavax Darlington, 1962
- Tachys flavicollis Motschulsky, 1862
- Tachys fortestriatus Baehr, 2003
- Tachys fortunatus Machado, 1989
- Tachys fulvicollis (Dejean, 1831)
- Tachys fumax Darlington, 1962
- Tachys gilvus Schaum, 1863
- Tachys gracchus Andrewes, 1935
- Tachys guangxicus (Deuve & Tian, 2011)
- Tachys gyotokuensis Tanaka, 1956
- Tachys haleakalae (Liebherr, 2021)
- Tachys halophilus Lindroth, 1966
- Tachys holmi (Basilewsky, 1963)
- Tachys hyalinus Casey, 1918
- Tachys hydrophilus (Germain, 1906)
- Tachys impictus Andrewes, 1925
- Tachys impressipennis Motschulsky, 1860
- Tachys impressus Motschulsky, 1851
- Tachys incertus Andrewes, 1925
- Tachys infuscatus Blackburn, 1888
- Tachys intermedius Baehr, 2012
- Tachys iridipennis Chaudoir, 1876
- Tachys jeannei Coulon, 2004
- Tachys joannae (Basilewsky, 1962)
- Tachys jucundulus Péringuey, 1908
- Tachys kabylianus Puel, 1935
- Tachys kahuzianus (Basilewsky, 1953)
- Tachys kaorutanakai Habu, 1977
- Tachys koizumii Habu, 1961
- Tachys koreanorum Pawlowski, 1974
- Tachys laevigatus (Boheman, 1858)
- Tachys laevus (Say, 1823)
- Tachys lamottei (Bruneau de Miré, 1964)
- Tachys languidus Andrewes, 1925
- Tachys latalatus Csiki, 1928
- Tachys leleupi (Basilewsky, 1953)
- Tachys lenkoranus Csiki, 1928
- Tachys leptocerus Chaudoir, 1876
- Tachys leytensis (Baehr, 2016)
- Tachys limbatellus Bates, 1884
- Tachys lindi Blackburn, 1888
- Tachys lissonotus Andrewes, 1925
- Tachys litoralis Casey, 1884
- Tachys lividus (Bates, 1871)
- Tachys longulus Andrewes, 1925
- Tachys lugubris Motschulsky, 1862
- Tachys lusciosus (Antoine, 1945)
- Tachys luscus Darlington, 1962
- Tachys macleayi Sloane, 1896
- Tachys macrops Baehr, 2012
- Tachys mameti Alluaud, 1933
- Tachys marri Baehr, 1987
- Tachys masculus Darlington, 1962
- Tachys massauxi (Basilewsky, 1955)
- Tachys mastersi Sloane, 1921
- Tachys micros (Fischer von Waldheim, 1828)
- Tachys microscopicus (Bates, 1873)
- Tachys minutissimus (R.F.Sahlberg, 1847)
- Tachys mirandus (Coulon & Wrase, 2008)
- Tachys mirei (Basilewsky, 1968)
- Tachys misellus LaFerté-Sénectère, 1841
- Tachys mitchelli Sloane, 1895
- Tachys monostictus Bates, 1871
- Tachys mordax LeConte, 1852
- Tachys mulwalensis Sloane, 1900
- Tachys mus Andrewes, 1925
- Tachys myrmecophilus (Jeannel, 1946)
- Tachys nanniscus Péringuey, 1896
- Tachys naraensis Ueno, 1953
- Tachys nephelodes Andrewes, 1930
- Tachys niger (Jeannel, 1953)
- Tachys nitmiluki (Giachino, 2003)
- Tachys oahuensis Blackburn, 1878
- Tachys oblitus Casey, 1918
- Tachys obtusiusculus (Jeannel, 1941)
- Tachys ochrias Andrewes, 1925
- Tachys ochrioides Darlington, 1962
- Tachys olemartini Kirschenhofer, 1986
- Tachys opalescens Andrewes, 1925
- Tachys orphninus Andrewes, 1925
- Tachys pallescens Bates, 1873
- Tachys pallidus Chaudoir, 1868
- Tachys pallorus Kopecky in Löbl & Smetana, 2003
- Tachys palustris Reitter in F.Hauser, 1894
- Tachys panamensis Casey, 1918
- Tachys paraserra Baehr, 2017
- Tachys particula Andrewes, 1936
- Tachys paulax Darlington, 1934
- Tachys perkinsi (Liebherr, 2021)
- Tachys pharao Schatzmayr & Koch, 1934
- Tachys piceolus LaFerté-Sénectère, 1841
- Tachys plagiatus Putzeys, 1875
- Tachys pliginskii Solodovnikov, 2001
- Tachys politissimus Baehr, 2014
- Tachys potomaca (Erwin, 1981)
- Tachys prionotus Andrewes, 1936
- Tachys privus Darlington, 1962
- Tachys prolixus Bates, 1892
- Tachys proximus (Say, 1823)
- Tachys pseudolusciosus Coulon, 2004
- Tachys pseudosericeus Kirschenhofer, 1986
- Tachys pujoli (Bruneau de Miré, 1964)
- Tachys pulchellus LaFerté-Sénectère, 1841
- Tachys pumilus (Dejean, 1831)
- Tachys pusillimus Péringuey, 1896
- Tachys queenslandicus Sloane, 1903
- Tachys rambai Jedlicka, 1966
- Tachys rectangulus Notman, 1919
- Tachys rhodeanus Casey, 1918
- Tachys riedeli Baehr, 2014
- Tachys sagax Casey, 1918
- Tachys scitulus LeConte, 1848
- Tachys scutellaris Stephens, 1828
- Tachys sellatus Fairmaire, 1892
- Tachys sequax LeConte, 1848
- Tachys sericans Bates, 1873
- Tachys sericeus Motschulsky, 1851
- Tachys serra Darlington, 1962
- Tachys serratus Andrewes, 1925
- Tachys serrula Darlington, 1962
- Tachys sexguttatus (Fairmaire, 1849)
- Tachys sibling Darlington, 1962
- Tachys similis Blackburn, 1888
- Tachys simulator Coulon, 2004
- Tachys spadix Casey, 1918
- Tachys striax Darlington, 1934
- Tachys subangulatus Bates, 1871
- Tachys subbrunneus Darlington, 1962
- Tachys sublobatus Darlington, 1962
- Tachys suboculatus (Basilewsky, 1958)
- Tachys sundaicus Andrewes, 1925
- Tachys suturifer Reitter, 1884
- Tachys sydneyensis Sloane, 1923
- Tachys szekessyi Jedlicka, 1968
- Tachys tenuiserra Darlington, 1962
- Tachys terryli (Liebherr, 2021)
- Tachys testaceus (Basilewsky, 1953)
- Tachys tetraphacus Bedel, 1896
- Tachys tienmushaniensis Kirschenhofer, 1986
- Tachys torretassoi Schatzmayr & Koch, 1934
- Tachys transcaucasicus Coulon, 2004
- Tachys translucens Darlington, 1937
- Tachys transumbratus Bates, 1892
- Tachys transversicollis (W.J.MacLeay, 1871)
- Tachys trechoderus Coulon, 2004
- Tachys trechulus Darlington, 1936
- Tachys troglocola (Deuve & Tian, 2011)
- Tachys troglophilus Ueno, 1953
- Tachys tropicalis Baehr, 2012
- Tachys tropicus (Nietner, 1858)
- Tachys truncatus (Nietner, 1858)
- Tachys turkestanicus Csiki, 1928
- Tachys uelensis Burgeon, 1935
- Tachys uenoianus Habu, 1974
- Tachys umbripennis Chaudoir, 1868
- Tachys uniformis Blackburn, 1888
- Tachys vandeli (Mateu & Colas, 1954)
- Tachys vandepolli (Bruneau de Miré, 1964)
- Tachys varsavianorum Pawlowski, 1974
- Tachys ventricosus LeConte, 1863
- Tachys venustus Andrewes, 1936
- Tachys vernilis Casey, 1918
- Tachys vibex Kopecky in Löbl & Smetana, 2003
- Tachys vietnami Jedlicka, 1968
- Tachys virgo LeConte, 1852
- Tachys vittiger LeConte, 1852
- Tachys vorax LeConte, 1852
- Tachys windsorensis Baehr, 1991
- Tachys xanthochrous Chaudoir, 1876
- Tachys yeboensis Burgeon, 1935
- Tachys yodai Jedlicka, 1964
- Tachys yorkensis Baehr, 2012
- Tachys yunchengensis Kirschenhofer, 1986
- Tachys zonatus Andrewes, 1925
- † Tachys haywardi Wickham, 1913
