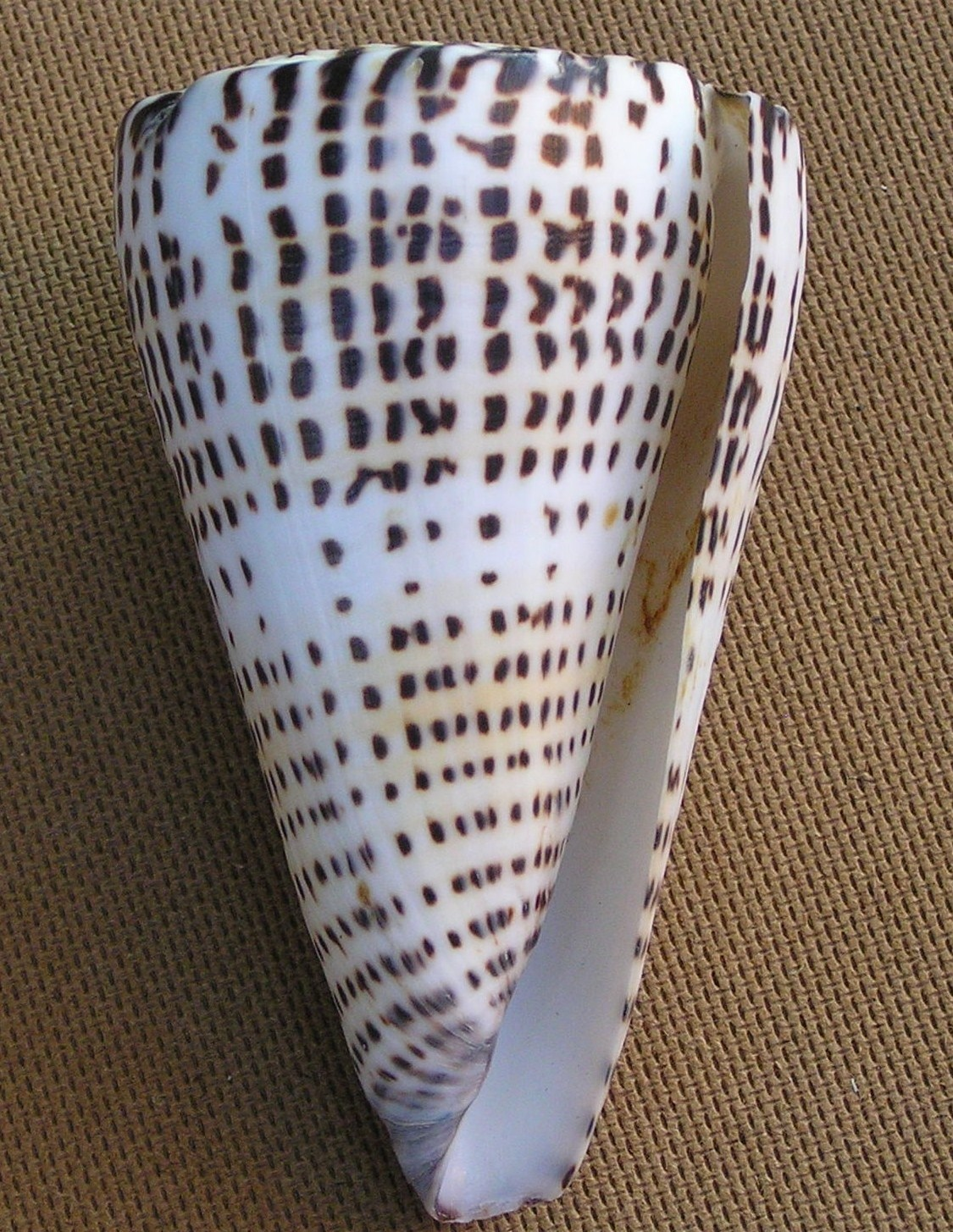
- Apertural view of shell of Conus leopardus (Röding, 1798).

Scientific classification
- Kingdom: Animalia
- Phylum: Mollusca
- Class: Gastropoda
- Subclass: Caenogastropoda
- Order: Neogastropoda
- Family: Conidae
- Genus: Conus
- Subgenus: Lithoconus; Mörch, 1852

Type species
- Conus millepunctatus Lamarck, 1822

Synonyms
- Dendroconus (Lithoconus) Mörch, 1852; Lithoconus Mörch, 1852

= Conus (Lithoconus) =

Subgenus of gastropods

Lithoconus is a subgenus of sea snails, marine gastropod molluscs in the genus Conus, family Conidae, the cone snails and their allies.

In the latest classification of the family Conidae by Puillandre N., Duda T.F., Meyer C., Olivera B.M. & Bouchet P. (2015), Lithoconus has become a subgenus of Conus as Conus (Lithoconus) Mörch, 1852 (type species:Conus millepunctatus Lamarck, 1822) represented as Conus Linnaeus, 1758

== Distinguishing characteristics ==
The Tucker & Tenorio 2009 taxonomy distinguishes Lithoconus from Conus in the following ways:

- Genus Conus sensu stricto Linnaeus, 1758

Shell characters (living and fossil species)

The basic shell shape is conical to elongated conical, has a deep anal notch on the shoulder, a smooth periostracum and a small operculum. The shoulder of the shell is usually nodulose and the protoconch is usually multispiral. Markings often include the presence of tents except for black or white color variants, with the absence of spiral lines of minute tents and textile bars.

Radular tooth (not known for fossil species)

The radula has an elongated anterior section with serrations and a large exposed terminating cusp, a non-obvious waist, blade is either small or absent and has a short barb, and lacks a basal spur.

Geographical distribution

These species are found in the Indo-Pacific region.

Feeding habits

These species eat other gastropods including cones.

- Subgenus Lithoconus Mörch, 1852

Shell characters (living and fossil species)

The shell is large, thick and obconic in shape, and the shoulders are subangular. The protoconch is multispiral, and the whorl tops are usually concave in cross section and have just one or two cords. The shell is ornamented with nodules which are obsolete but present. The anal notch is shallow to moderately deep, depending upon the species. The color pattern includes spiral rows of brown, red or black markings, and the anterior end is usually colored black, red, blue or lavender. The periostracum is smooth and very thick, and the operculum is large.

Radular tooth (not known for fossil species)

The anterior section of the radular tooth may be shorter or significantly longer than the length of posterior section, and the blade is long and covers most of the anterior section. A basal spur is present, and the barb is short. The radular tooth has several rows of coarse denticles.

Geographical distribution

The species in this genus occur in the occur in the Indo-Pacific region.

Feeding habits

These cone snails are vermivorous, meaning that the cones prey on a variety of polychaete worms, including enteropneust, eunicid, capitellid, and nereid worms.

== Species list ==
This list of species is based on the information in the World Register of Marine Species (WoRMS) list. Species within the genus Lithoconus include:

- Lithoconus caracteristicus (Fischer von Waldheim, 1807): synonym of Conus caracteristicus Fischer von Waldheim, 1807
- Lithoconus eburneus (Hwass in Bruguière, 1792): synonym of Conus eburneus Hwass in Bruguière, 1792
- Lithoconus edaphus (Dall, 1910) : synonym of Conus edaphus Dall, 1910
- Lithoconus leopardus (Röding, 1798): synonym of Conus leopardus (Röding, 1798)
- Lithoconus peasei Brazier, 1877: synonym of Conus flavidus Lamarck, 1810
- Lithoconus sandwichensis (Walls, 1978): synonym of Conus sandwichensis Walls, 1978
- Lithoconus suturatus (Reeve, 1844): synonym of Conus suturatus Reeve, 1844
- Lithoconus tessulatus (Born, 1778): synonym of Conus tessulatus Born, 1778
