= Conus (Atlanticonus) =

Scientific classification
- Kingdom: Animalia
- Phylum: Mollusca
- Class: Gastropoda
- Subclass: Caenogastropoda
- Order: Neogastropoda
- Family: Conidae
- Genus: Conus
- Subgenus: Atlanticonus; Petuch & Sargent, 2012

Type species
- Conus granulatus Linnaeus, 1758

Synonyms
- Atlanticonus Petuch & Sargent, 2012

Subgenus of gastropods

Atlanticonus is a taxon of sea snails, marine gastropod mollusks in the family Conidae. Although formerly described as a distinct subgenus, it is currently considered as an alternative representation of the cone snail genus, Conus.

== Species ==
All the species formerly classified in the subgenus Atlanticonus are now considered as "alternate representations" of species in the genus Conus:

- Conus (Atlanticonus) cuna (Petuch, 1998) represented as Conus cuna Petuch, 1998
- †Conus (Atlanticonus) franklinae Hendricks, 2015 represented as †Conus franklinae Hendricks, 2015
- Conus (Atlanticonus) glenni (Petuch, 1993) represented as Conus glenni Petuch, 1993
- Conus (Atlanticonus) granulatus (Linnaeus, 1758) represented as Conus granulatus Linnaeus, 1758
- †Conus (Atlanticonus) olssoni Maury, 1917represented as †Conus olssoni Maury, 1917
- Conus (Atlanticonus) ritae (Petuch, 1995) represented as Conus ritae Petuch, 1995
