= Carabus bessarabicus concretus =

Scientific classification
- Domain: Eukaryota
- Kingdom: Animalia
- Phylum: Arthropoda
- Class: Insecta
- Order: Coleoptera
- Suborder: Adephaga
- Family: Carabidae
- Genus: Carabus
- Species: C. bessarabicus
- Subspecies: C. b. concretus

Trinomial name
- Carabus bessarabicus concretus Fischer von Waldheim, 1823

Subspecies of beetle

Carabus bessarabicus concretus is a subspecies of ground beetle in the family Carabidae that can be found in Russia, Kazakhstan, Kyrgyzstan and Ukraine. They are blackish-gray coloured.
