= Tachys micros =

Scientific classification
- Kingdom: Animalia
- Phylum: Arthropoda
- Clade: Pancrustacea
- Class: Insecta
- Order: Coleoptera
- Suborder: Adephaga
- Family: Carabidae
- Genus: Tachys
- Species: T. micros

Binomial name
- Tachys micros (Fischer von Waldheim, 1828)

Synonyms
- Dromius micros Fischer von Waldheim, 1828); Tachys gregarius Chaudoir, 1846; Tachys nigrifrons Fauvel, 1863; Tachys palustris Reitter, 1894

Species of beetle

Tachys micros is a species of ground beetle in the Trechinae subfamily, and in the subgenus, Paratachys. It was first described in 1828 by Gotthelf Fischer von Waldheim, as Dromius micros.
