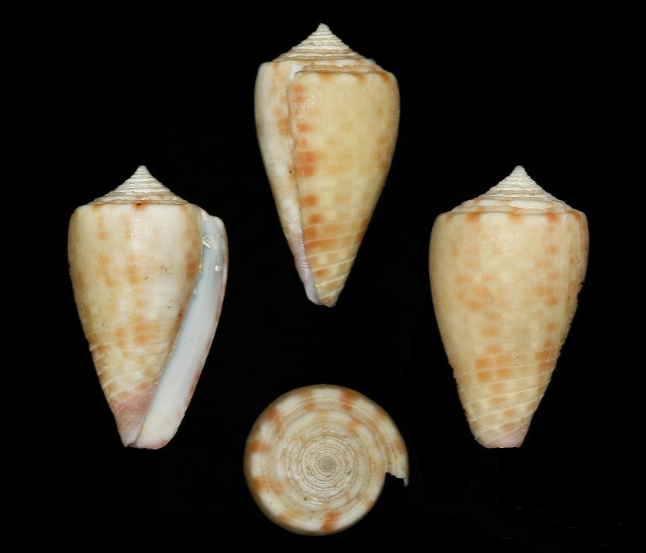
- Shell and prototype of Conus edaphus (holotype at the Smithsonian Institution)

Scientific classification
- Domain: Eukaryota
- Kingdom: Animalia
- Phylum: Mollusca
- Class: Gastropoda
- Subclass: Caenogastropoda
- Order: Neogastropoda
- Superfamily: Conoidea
- Family: Conidae
- Genus: Conus
- Species: C. edaphus

Binomial name
- Conus edaphus Dall, 1910

Synonyms
- Conus (Tesselliconus) edaphus Dall, 1910 accepted, alternate representation; Lithoconus edaphus (Dall, 1910); Tesselliconus edaphus (Dall, 1910)

= Conus edaphus =

Species of sea snail

Conus edaphus is a species of sea snail, a marine gastropod mollusk in the family Conidae, the cone snails, cone shells or cones.

These snails are predatory and venomous. They are capable of stinging humans.

== Description ==
The size of the shell varies between 25 mm and 82 mm.

(Original description) The small, short, stout, solid shell has a short acute spire, rounded shoulder, and slightly convex sides. The protoconch consists of 2½ translucent whitish rounded whorls with a dimple at the apex. Of the remaining 8½ whorls the earlier five have the shoulder irregularly, obscurely, minutely beaded. The slope from the protoconch to the shoulder of the body whorl is slightly concave. The fasciole between the shoulder and the suture behind it is depressed, with two strong spiral sulci running in it, the interspaces rather tumid. The coloration of the shell is peculiar. The pattern recalls Conus taeniatus and Conus tessulatus. The ground is a subtranslucent waxen white. Between the shoulder and the siphonal canal there are about sixteen subequal, rectangularly articulated, spiral bands separated by narrower spaces of the ground color. The articulations are vermilion or orange red and opaque white alternately. On the spire are nearly a dozen radiating orange or vermilion flammules. The interior of the aperture is rosy white, the region about the canal deep rose color. The only sculpture on the sides of the shell consists of about six equidistant channeled sulci, growing wider anteriorly until the siphonal canal is reached, and a few smaller striae on the siphonal fasciole. The aperture is narrow, parallel-sided, with a straight outer lip, the anterior and posterior sinuses moderately deep.

== Distribution ==
This marine species occurs from the Gulf of California, Mexico to Panama
