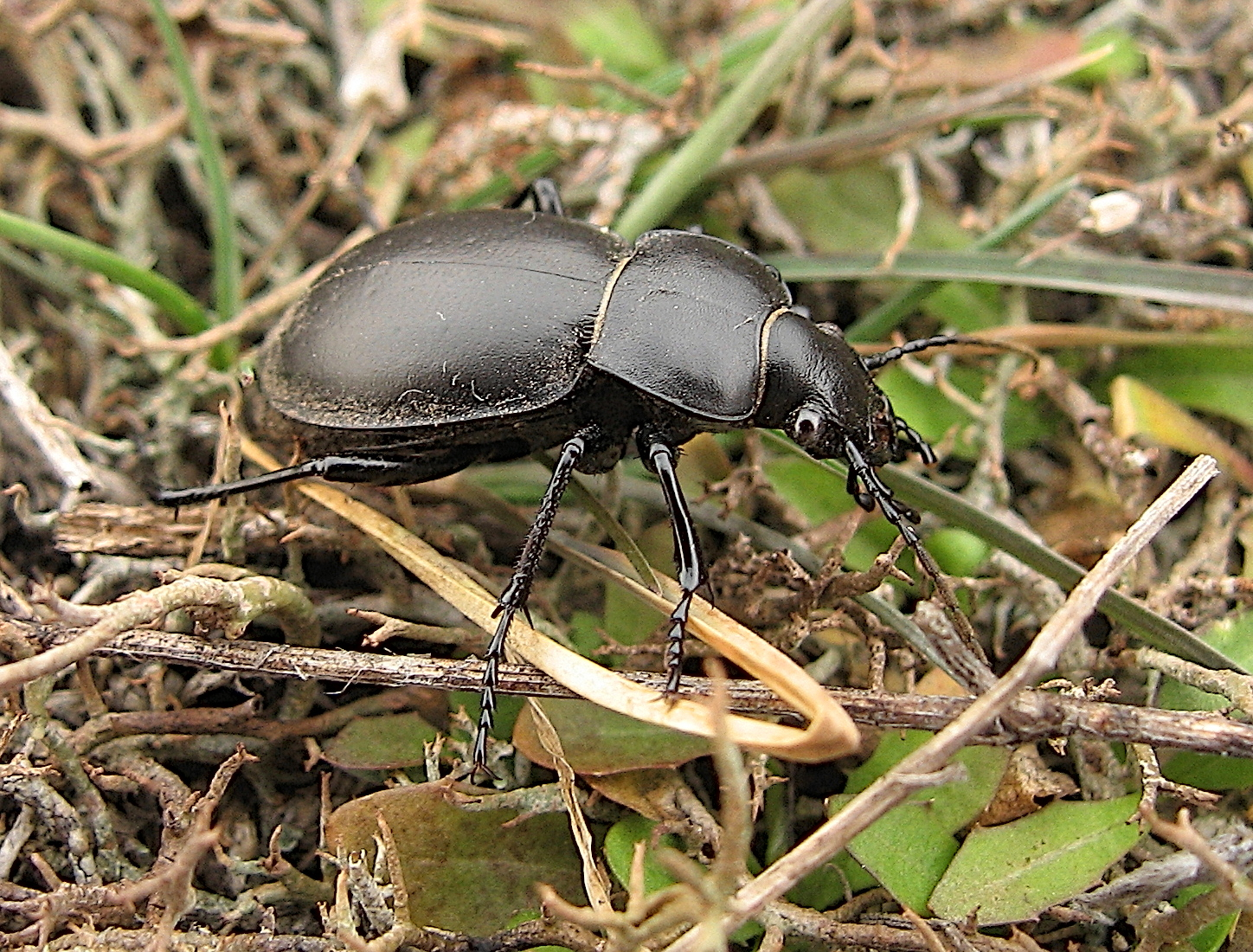

Scientific classification
- Domain: Eukaryota
- Kingdom: Animalia
- Phylum: Arthropoda
- Class: Insecta
- Order: Coleoptera
- Suborder: Adephaga
- Family: Carabidae
- Genus: Carabus
- Species: C. bessarabicus

Binomial name
- Carabus bessarabicus Fischer von Waldheim, 1823

= Carabus bessarabicus =

Species of beetle

Carabus bessarabicus is a species of ground beetle from family Carabidae found in Moldova, Russia and Ukraine. The blackish-gray species could also be found in Kazakhstan.

Subspecies include:

- Carabus bessarabicus concretus
