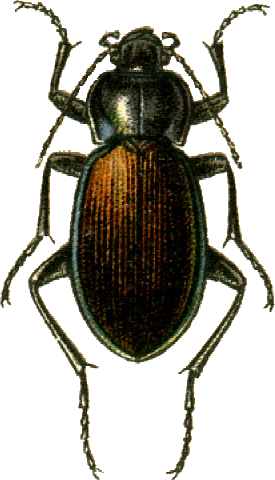

Scientific classification
- Domain: Eukaryota
- Kingdom: Animalia
- Phylum: Arthropoda
- Class: Insecta
- Order: Coleoptera
- Suborder: Adephaga
- Family: Carabidae
- Genus: Carabus
- Species: C. regalis

Binomial name
- Carabus regalis Fischer von Waldheim, 1822

= Carabus regalis =

Species of beetle

Carabus regalis is a species of beetle from the family Carabidae, found in Mongolia and Russia.
