= Nebria gregaria =

Scientific classification
- Domain: Eukaryota
- Kingdom: Animalia
- Phylum: Arthropoda
- Class: Insecta
- Order: Coleoptera
- Suborder: Adephaga
- Family: Carabidae
- Genus: Nebria
- Species: N. gregaria

Binomial name
- Nebria gregaria Fischer von Waldheim, 1820

Synonyms
- Nebria cuneata Casey, 1913

Species of beetle

Nebria gregaria, the gregarious gazelle beetle, is a species of beetle in the family Carabidae. It is found in Alaska, United States and Aleutian Islands, as well as parts of eastern Russia and China. It is only found near water.

Adults brachypterous, nocturnal and carnivorous.
