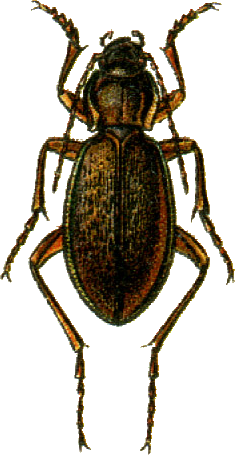

Scientific classification
- Domain: Eukaryota
- Kingdom: Animalia
- Phylum: Arthropoda
- Class: Insecta
- Order: Coleoptera
- Suborder: Adephaga
- Family: Carabidae
- Genus: Carabus
- Species: C. henningi

Binomial name
- Carabus henningi Fischer von Waldheim, 1817

= Carabus henningi =

Species of beetle

Carabus henningi is a species of ground beetle in the Carabinae subfamily that can be found in Mongolia and Russia.
