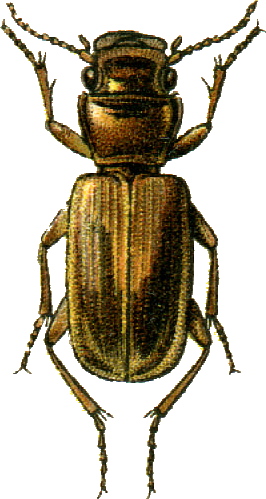

Scientific classification
- Domain: Eukaryota
- Kingdom: Animalia
- Phylum: Arthropoda
- Class: Insecta
- Order: Coleoptera
- Suborder: Adephaga
- Family: Carabidae
- Subfamily: Harpalinae
- Tribe: Harpalini
- Genus: Daptus
- Species: D. pictus

Binomial name
- Daptus pictus Fischer von Waldheim, 1823

= Daptus pictus =

Species of beetle

Daptus pictus is a species of ground beetle in the subfamily Harpalinae.
