= Characteristic cone =

Characteristic Cone may refer to:

- Monge cone
- Conus caracteristicus, common name Characteristic Cone
