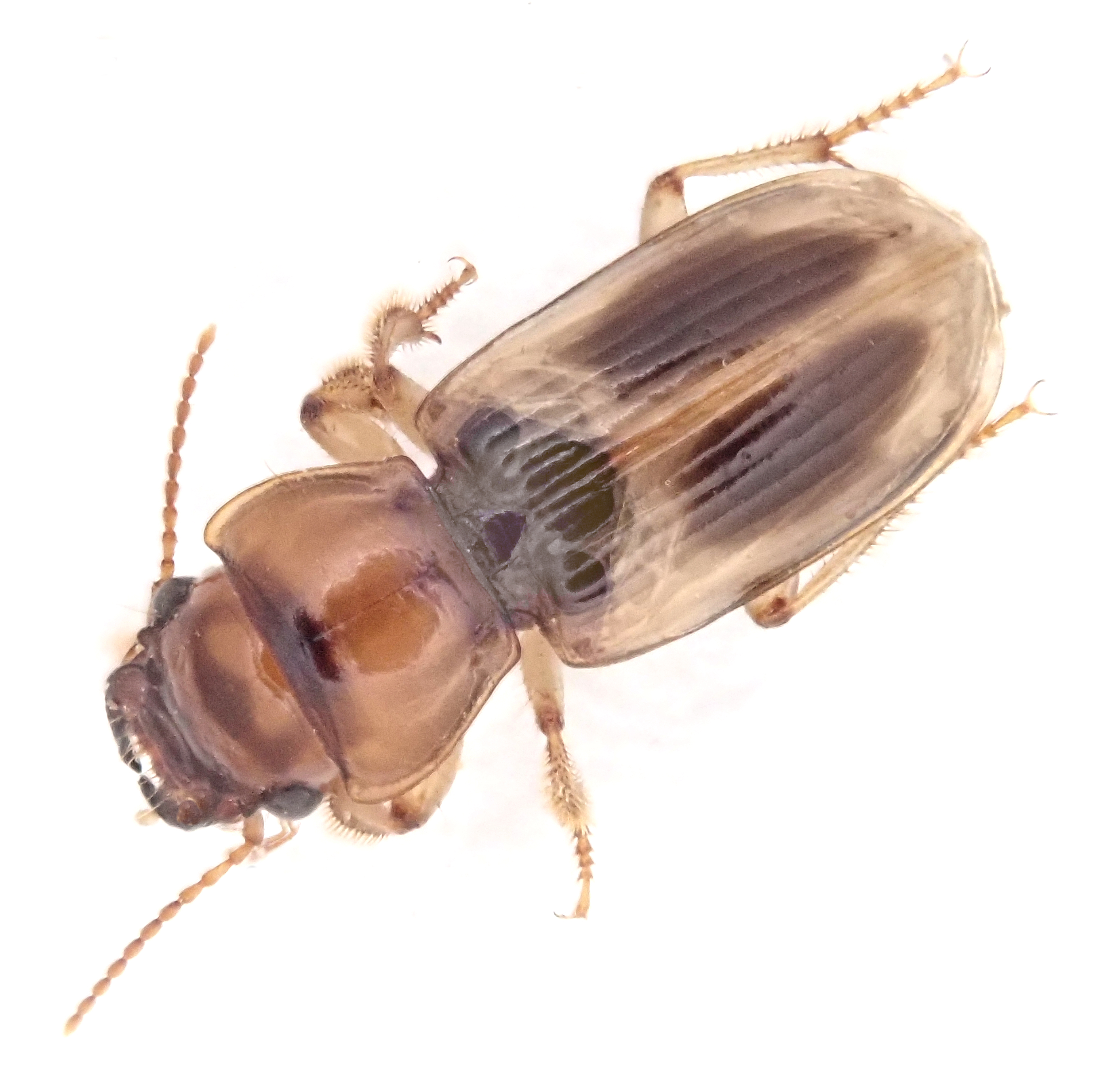
- Daptus vittatus

Scientific classification
- Domain: Eukaryota
- Kingdom: Animalia
- Phylum: Arthropoda
- Class: Insecta
- Order: Coleoptera
- Suborder: Adephaga
- Family: Carabidae
- Subfamily: Harpalinae
- Tribe: Harpalini
- Subtribe: Harpalina
- Genus: Daptus; Fischer von Waldheim, 1823

= Daptus =

Genus of beetles

Daptus is a genus of beetles in the family Carabidae first described by Fischer von Waldheim in 1823.

== Species ==
Daptus contains the following three species:

- Daptus komarowi Semenov, 1889
- Daptus pictus Fischer von Waldheim, 1823
- Daptus vittatus Fischer von Waldheim, 1823
