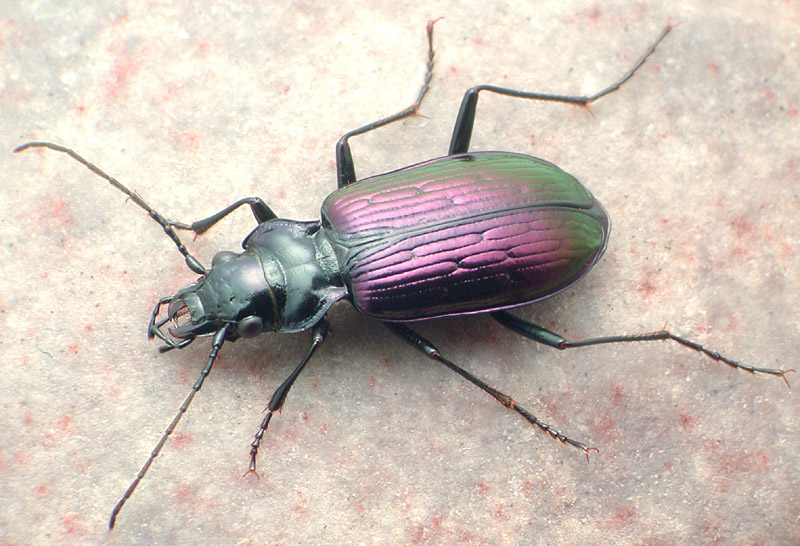

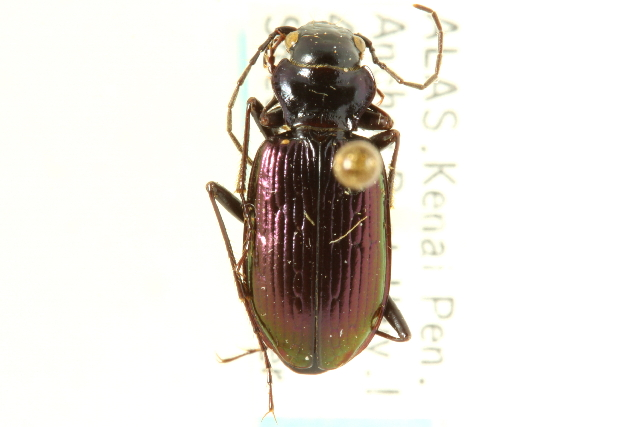

Scientific classification
- Domain: Eukaryota
- Kingdom: Animalia
- Phylum: Arthropoda
- Class: Insecta
- Order: Coleoptera
- Suborder: Adephaga
- Family: Carabidae
- Genus: Nebria
- Species: N. metallica

Binomial name
- Nebria metallica Fischer von Waldheim, 1822

Synonyms
- Nebria pacifica Chaudoir, 1850

= Nebria metallica =

Species of beetle

Nebria metallica, the Metallic gazelle beetle, is a species of ground beetle in the subfamily Nebriinae first described by Gotthelf Fischer von Waldheim in 1822. It ranges from the Aleutian Islands, southern Alaska, and western Canada south to Washington and Montana.

It is considered to have a predatory diet, with both the larvae and adult Nebria metallica being considered a predator.
