= Tachys obtusiusculus =

Scientific classification
- Domain: Eukaryota
- Kingdom: Animalia
- Phylum: Arthropoda
- Class: Insecta
- Order: Coleoptera
- Suborder: Adephaga
- Family: Carabidae
- Genus: Tachys
- Species: T. obtusiusculus

Binomial name
- Tachys obtusiusculus Jeannel, 1941

Synonyms
- Tachys edmondsi Moore, 1956; Tachys piceus Edmonds, 1934; Tachys obtusiusculus Jeannel, 1941

Species of beetle

Tachys obtusiusculus is a species of ground beetle in the Trechinae subfamily.
