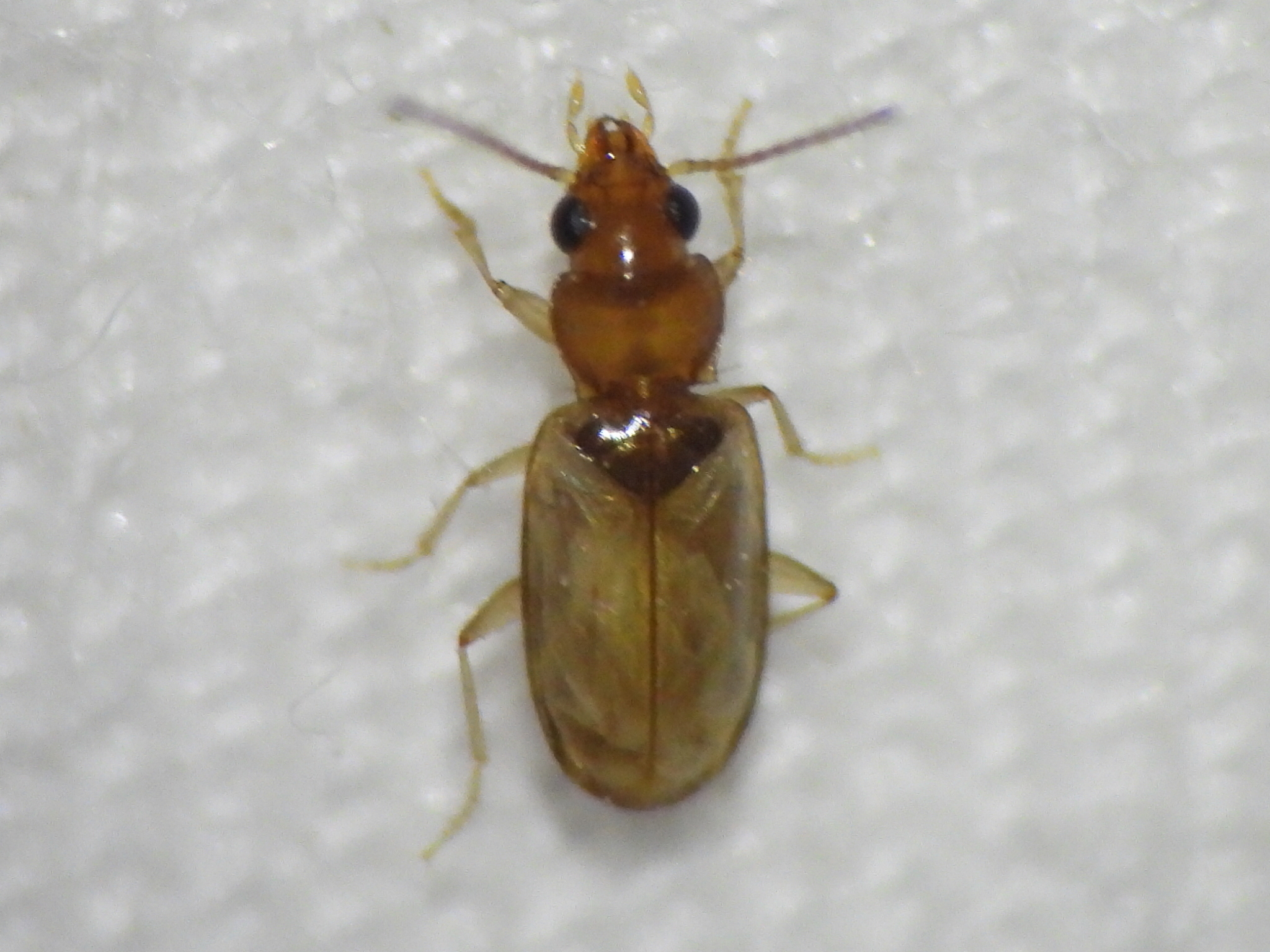

Scientific classification
- Kingdom: Animalia
- Phylum: Arthropoda
- Class: Insecta
- Order: Coleoptera
- Suborder: Adephaga
- Family: Carabidae
- Genus: Tachys
- Species: T. pallidus

Binomial name
- Tachys pallidus Chaudoir, 1868

= Tachys pallidus =

Species of beetle

Tachys pallidus is a species of ground beetle in the family Carabidae. It is found in North America.
