= Tachys pulchellus =

Scientific classification
- Kingdom: Animalia
- Phylum: Arthropoda
- Class: Insecta
- Order: Coleoptera
- Suborder: Adephaga
- Family: Carabidae
- Subfamily: Trechinae
- Tribe: Bembidiini
- Genus: Tachys
- Species: T. pulchellus

Binomial name
- Tachys pulchellus LaFerté-Sénectère, 1841

Species of beetle

Tachys pulchellus is a species of ground beetle in the family Carabidae. It is found in North America.
