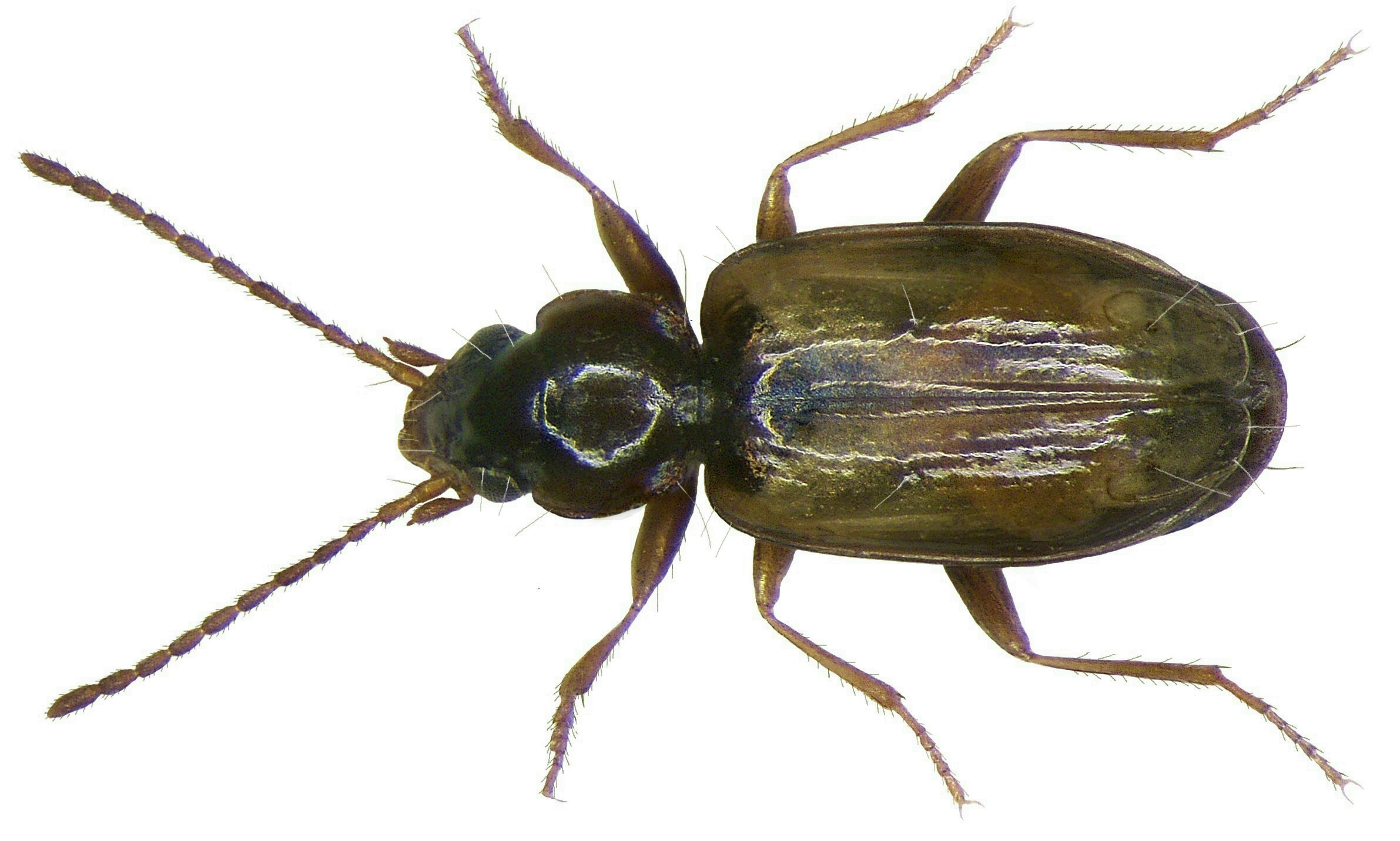

Scientific classification
- Kingdom: Animalia
- Phylum: Arthropoda
- Clade: Pancrustacea
- Class: Insecta
- Order: Coleoptera
- Suborder: Adephaga
- Family: Carabidae
- Genus: Tachys
- Species: T. scutellaris

Binomial name
- Tachys scutellaris Stephens, 1828)

= Tachys scutellaris =

Species of beetle

Tachys scutellaris is a very small ground beetle found in salt marshes.
