= Tachys pumilus =

Scientific classification
- Kingdom: Animalia
- Phylum: Arthropoda
- Class: Insecta
- Order: Coleoptera
- Suborder: Adephaga
- Family: Carabidae
- Genus: Tachys
- Species: T. pumilus

Binomial name
- Tachys pumilus (Dejean, 1831)

Species of beetle

Tachys pumilus is a species of ground beetle in the family Carabidae. It is found in the Caribbean Sea, Central America, and North America.
