= Tachys vorax =

Scientific classification
- Domain: Eukaryota
- Kingdom: Animalia
- Phylum: Arthropoda
- Class: Insecta
- Order: Coleoptera
- Suborder: Adephaga
- Family: Carabidae
- Genus: Tachys
- Species: T. vorax

Binomial name
- Tachys vorax LeConte, 1852

Species of beetle

Tachys vorax is a species of ground beetle in the family Carabidae. It is found in Central America and North America.
