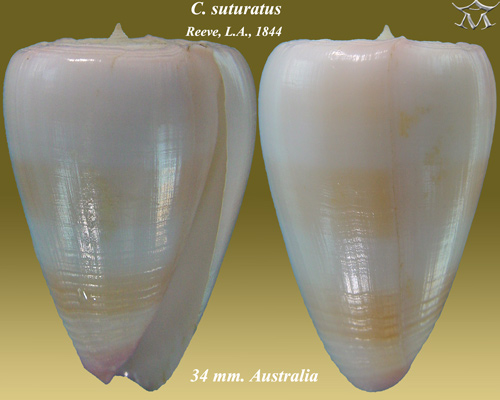
- Apertural and abapertural views of shell of Conus suturatus Reeve, L.A., 1844
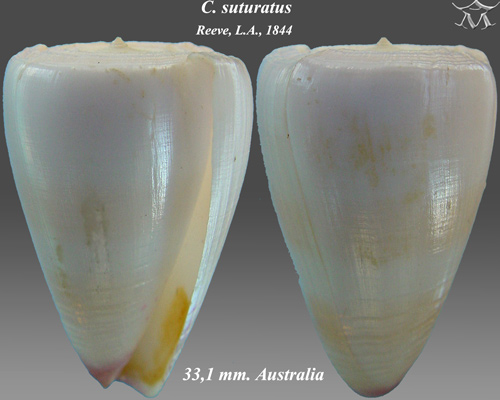

Scientific classification
- Kingdom: Animalia
- Phylum: Mollusca
- Class: Gastropoda
- Subclass: Caenogastropoda
- Order: Neogastropoda
- Superfamily: Conoidea
- Family: Conidae
- Genus: Conus
- Species: C. suturatus

Binomial name
- Conus suturatus Reeve, 1844

Synonyms
- Conus (Tesselliconus) suturatus Reeve, 1844 · accepted, alternate representation; Conus hawaiensis Kaicher, 1956 (unavailable name: nomen nudum); Conus suturatus kashiwajimensis Shikama, 1971; Conus turbinatus G. B. Sowerby II, 1858; Lithoconus suturatus (Reeve, 1844); Puncticularis suturatus Gillett, K. & McNeill, F. 1959; Tesselliconus suturatus (Reeve, 1844)

= Conus suturatus =

Species of sea snail

Conus suturatus, common name the violet-base cone, is a species of sea snail, a marine gastropod mollusk in the family Conidae, the cone snails and their allies.

Like all species within the genus Conus, these snails are predatory and venomous. They are capable of stinging humans, therefore live ones should be handled carefully or not at all.

Subspecies

- Conus suturatus kashiwajimensis Shikama, 1971: synonym of Conus suturatus Reeve, 1844
- Conus suturatus sandwichensis Walls, 1978: synonym of Conus sandwichensis Walls, 1978

== Description ==
The size of the shell varies between 25 mm and 43 mm. The color of the shell is yellowish or pink-white, with broad light brown bands. The spire and the base of the shell are sulcate.

== Distribution ==
This marine species occurs in the Eastern Indian Ocean, in the Western Pacific Ocean and off Australia (Northern Territory, Queensland and Western Australia).
