= Tachys potomaca =

Scientific classification
- Domain: Eukaryota
- Kingdom: Animalia
- Phylum: Arthropoda
- Class: Insecta
- Order: Coleoptera
- Suborder: Adephaga
- Family: Carabidae
- Genus: Tachys
- Species: T. potomaca

Binomial name
- Tachys potomaca (Erwin, 1981)

Species of beetle

Tachys potomaca is a species of ground beetle in the family Carabidae.
