= Tachys laevus =

Scientific classification
- Domain: Eukaryota
- Kingdom: Animalia
- Phylum: Arthropoda
- Class: Insecta
- Order: Coleoptera
- Suborder: Adephaga
- Family: Carabidae
- Subfamily: Trechinae
- Tribe: Bembidiini
- Genus: Tachys
- Species: T. laevus

Binomial name
- Tachys laevus (Say, 1823)

Synonyms
- Polyderis laeva (Say, 1823)

Species of beetle

Tachys laevus is a species of ground beetle in the family Carabidae. It is found in the United States and Canada.
