= Tachys scitulus =

Scientific classification
- Domain: Eukaryota
- Kingdom: Animalia
- Phylum: Arthropoda
- Class: Insecta
- Order: Coleoptera
- Suborder: Adephaga
- Family: Carabidae
- Genus: Tachys
- Species: T. scitulus

Binomial name
- Tachys scitulus Leconte, 1848

Species of beetle

Tachys scitulus is a species of ground beetle in the family Carabidae. It is found in the Caribbean Sea and North America.
