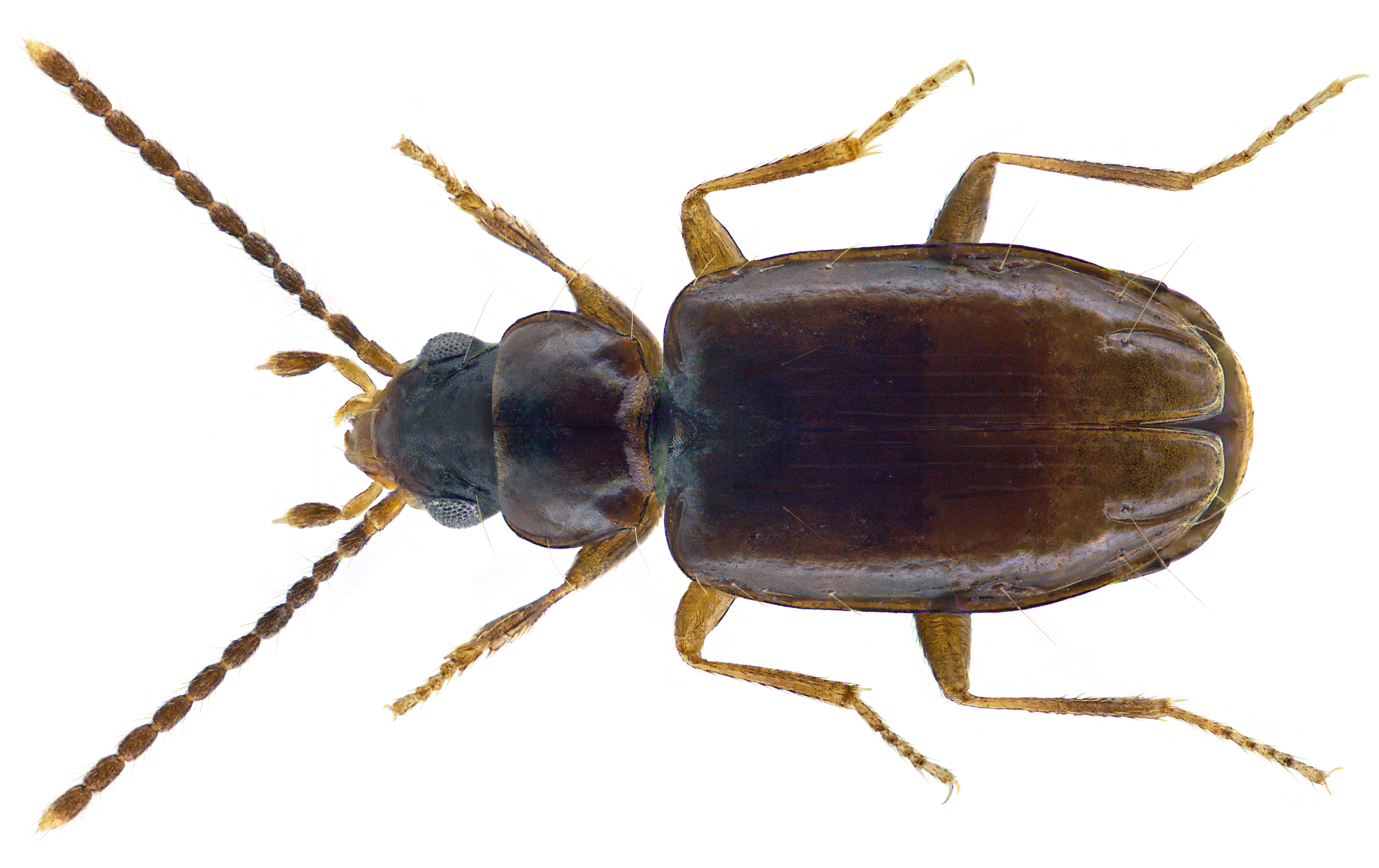

Scientific classification
- Domain: Eukaryota
- Kingdom: Animalia
- Phylum: Arthropoda
- Class: Insecta
- Order: Coleoptera
- Suborder: Adephaga
- Family: Carabidae
- Genus: Tachys
- Species: T. bistriatus

Binomial name
- Tachys bistriatus Duftschmid, 1812

= Tachys bistriatus =

Species of beetle

Tachys bistriatus is a species of ground beetle in the Trechinae subfamily.
