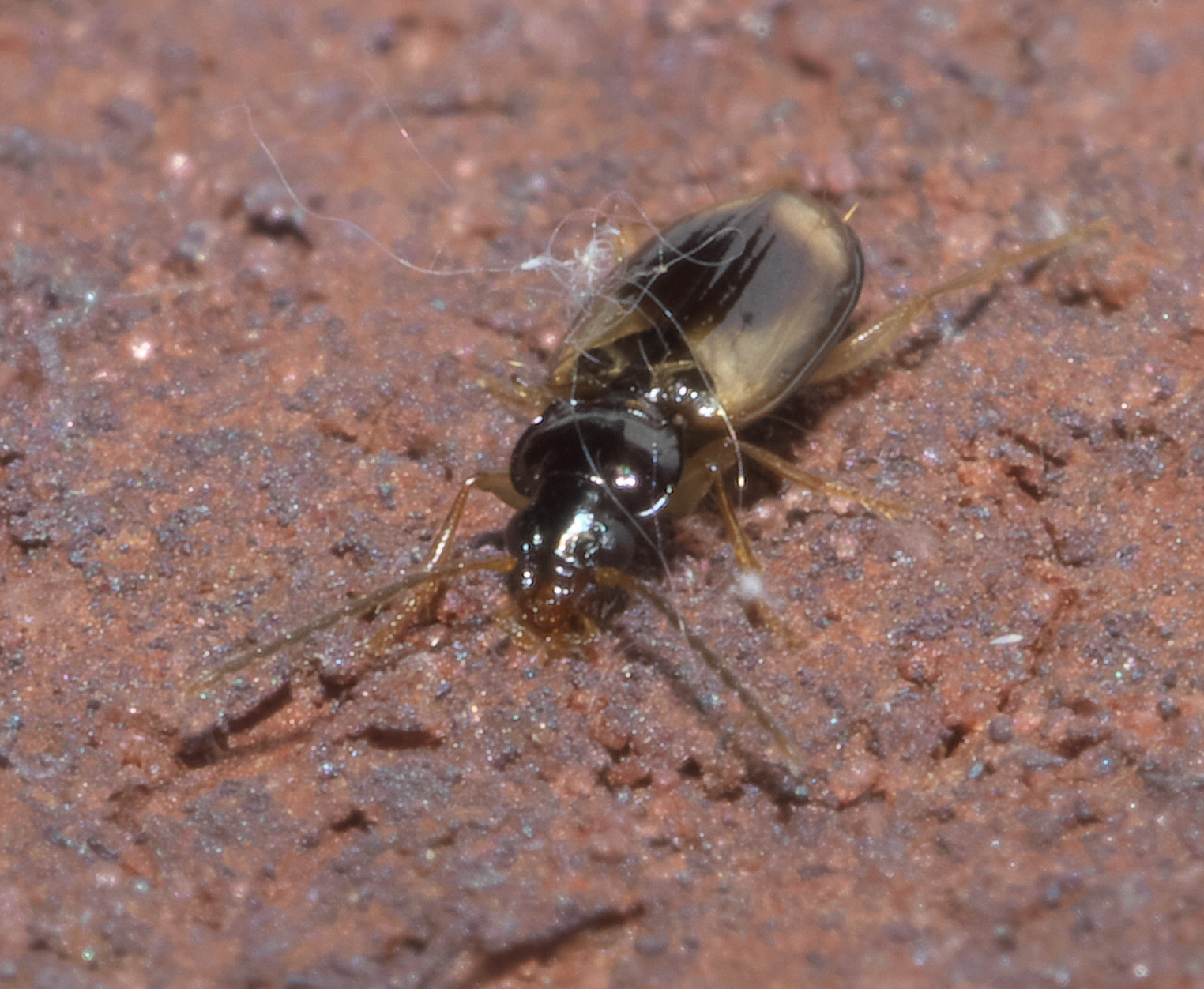

Scientific classification
- Domain: Eukaryota
- Kingdom: Animalia
- Phylum: Arthropoda
- Class: Insecta
- Order: Coleoptera
- Suborder: Adephaga
- Family: Carabidae
- Genus: Tachys
- Species: T. proximus

Binomial name
- Tachys proximus (Say, 1823)

= Tachys proximus =

Species of beetle

Tachys proximus is a species of ground beetle in the family Carabidae. It is found in Central America and North America.
