= Daptus komarowi =

Scientific classification
- Domain: Eukaryota
- Kingdom: Animalia
- Phylum: Arthropoda
- Class: Insecta
- Order: Coleoptera
- Suborder: Adephaga
- Family: Carabidae
- Subfamily: Harpalinae
- Tribe: Harpalini
- Genus: Daptus
- Species: D. komarowi

Binomial name
- Daptus komarowi Semenov, 1889

Species of beetle

Daptus komarowi is a species of ground beetle in the subfamily Harpalinae.
