= Tachys vittiger =

Scientific classification
- Domain: Eukaryota
- Kingdom: Animalia
- Phylum: Arthropoda
- Class: Insecta
- Order: Coleoptera
- Suborder: Adephaga
- Family: Carabidae
- Genus: Tachys
- Species: T. vittiger

Binomial name
- Tachys vittiger LeConte, 1852

Species of beetle

Tachys vittiger is a species of ground beetle in the family Carabidae. It is found in North America.
