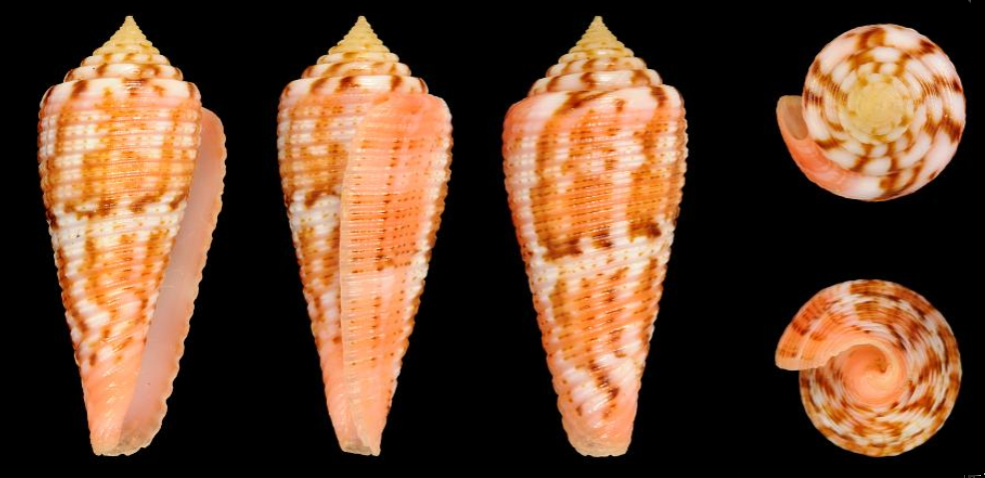
- Shell and protoconch of Conus granulatus (specimen at the Smithsonian Institution)

Conservation status
- Least Concern (IUCN 3.1)

Scientific classification
- Kingdom: Animalia
- Phylum: Mollusca
- Class: Gastropoda
- Subclass: Caenogastropoda
- Order: Neogastropoda
- Superfamily: Conoidea
- Family: Conidae
- Genus: Conus
- Species: C. granulatus

Binomial name
- Conus granulatus Linnaeus, 1758

Synonyms
- Atlanticonus granulatus (Linnaeus, 1758); Conus (Atlanticonus) granulatus (Linnaeus, 1758) · accepted, alternate representation; Conus granulatus var. espinosai Sarasua, 1977; Conus laetus Gmelin, 1791; Conus roseus Fischer von Waldheim, 1807; Conus verulosus Hwass in Bruguière, 1792; Cucullus antillarum Röding, 1798; Gladioconus granulatus (Linnaeus, 1758)

= Conus granulatus =

Species of sea snail

Conus granulatus is a species of sea snail, a marine gastropod mollusk in the family Conidae, the cone snails and their allies.

Like all species within the genus Conus, these snails are predatory and venomous. They are capable of stinging humans, therefore live ones should be handled carefully or not at all.

== Distribution ==
This species occurs in the Western Atlantic, at depths to 50 metres, and in the Caribbean Sea and in the Gulf of Mexico.

== Description ==
The maximum recorded shell length is 64.1 mm.
Shell fragments are known that would suggest a maximum size around 77 mm.

The shell is regularly grooved throughout the body whorl, with the interstices plane or granular. The spire is striate, often gradate. The color is orange-red, raised portions with very narrow chestnut revolving lines, white clouded, especially in the middle, forming an irregular band, which is mottled and bordered with chestnut. The interior of the aperture is rosy.

== Habitat ==
Minimum recorded depth is 0 m. Maximum recorded depth is 30 m.
At Barbados, the species seems to prefer offshore banking reefs where the water is clean, clear and well oxygenated
although in past times it appears to have inhabited much shallower waters close to shore, before environmental degradation.

== Gallery ==
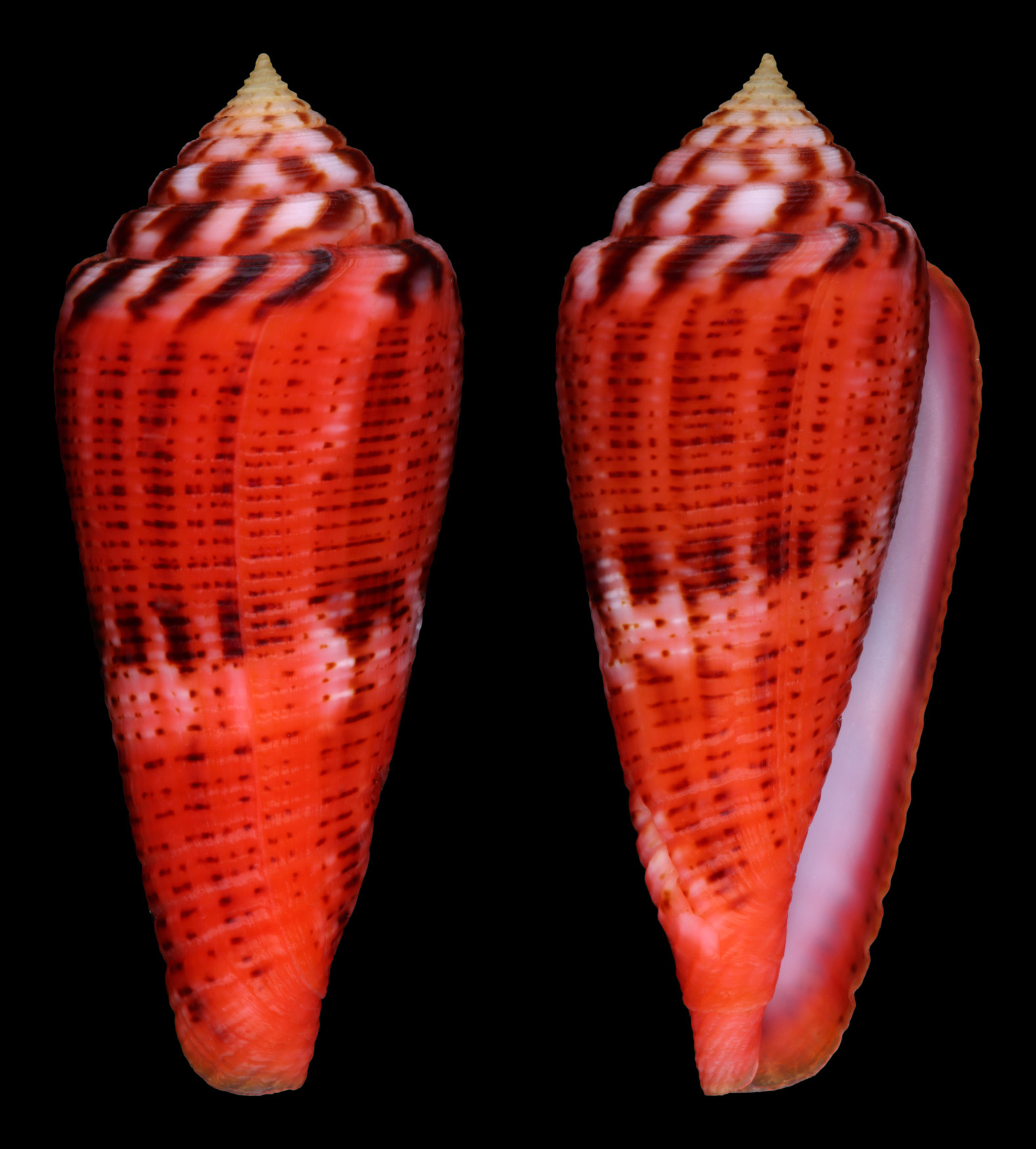
Conus granulatus Linnaeus, C., 1758

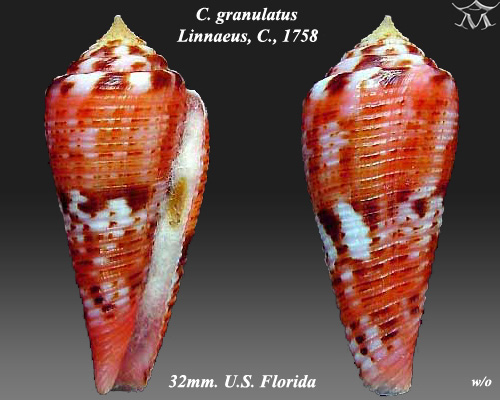
Conus granulatus Linnaeus, C., 1758
