= Tachys assamicus =

Scientific classification
- Domain: Eukaryota
- Kingdom: Animalia
- Phylum: Arthropoda
- Class: Insecta
- Order: Coleoptera
- Suborder: Adephaga
- Family: Carabidae
- Genus: Tachys
- Species: T. assamicus

Binomial name
- Tachys assamicus (Jedlička, 1964)

Synonyms
- Acupalpus assamicus Jedlička, 1964

Species of beetle

Tachys assamicus is an insect-eating ground beetle of the genus Tachys. It is found in India.
