= Conus caracteristicus =

Conservation status
- Least Concern (IUCN 3.1)

Scientific classification
- Kingdom: Animalia
- Phylum: Mollusca
- Class: Gastropoda
- Subclass: Caenogastropoda
- Order: Neogastropoda
- Superfamily: Conoidea
- Family: Conidae
- Genus: Conus
- Species: C. caracteristicus

Binomial name
- Conus caracteristicus Fischer von Waldheim, 1807

Synonyms
- Conus (Puncticulis) caracteristicus Fischer von Waldheim, 1807 · accepted, alternate representation; Conus brevis E. A. Smith, 1877; Conus characteristicus Dillwyn, 1817; Conus masoni H. Nevill & N. Nevill, 1874; Conus muscosus Lamarck, 1810; Lithoconus caracteristicus (Fischer von Waldheim, 1807); Tesselliconus caracteristicus (Fischer von Waldheim, 1807)

Species of sea snail

Conus caracteristicus, common name the characteristic cone, is a species of sea snail, a marine gastropod mollusk in the family Conidae, the cone snails and their allies.

Like all species within the genus Conus, these snails are predatory and venomous. They are capable of stinging humans; live ones should be handled carefully or not at all.

== Description ==
The size of the shell varies between 19 mm and 88 mm. The color of the shell is white, irregularly longitudinally flamed, forming two (or sometimes three) interrupted broad bands. The body whorl is somewhat inflated, rounded at the upper part, and striate below. The spire is striate.

== Distribution ==
This marine species occurs in the Indian Ocean off Northern KwaZulu-Natal, South Africa, and East Africa, from the Bay of Bengal to Indonesia and Japan

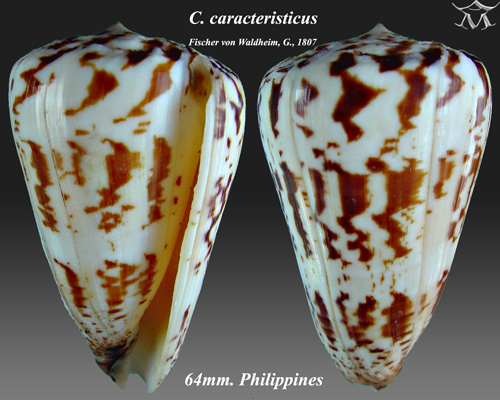
Conus caracteristicus Fischer von Waldheim, G., 1807

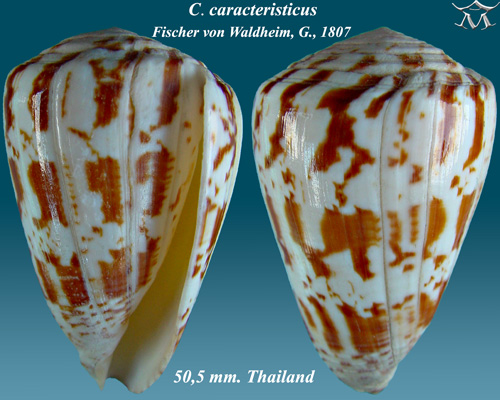
Conus caracteristicus Fischer von Waldheim, G., 1807

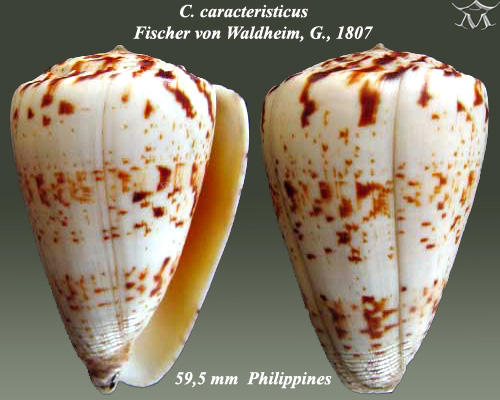
Conus caracteristicus Fischer von Waldheim, G., 1807
