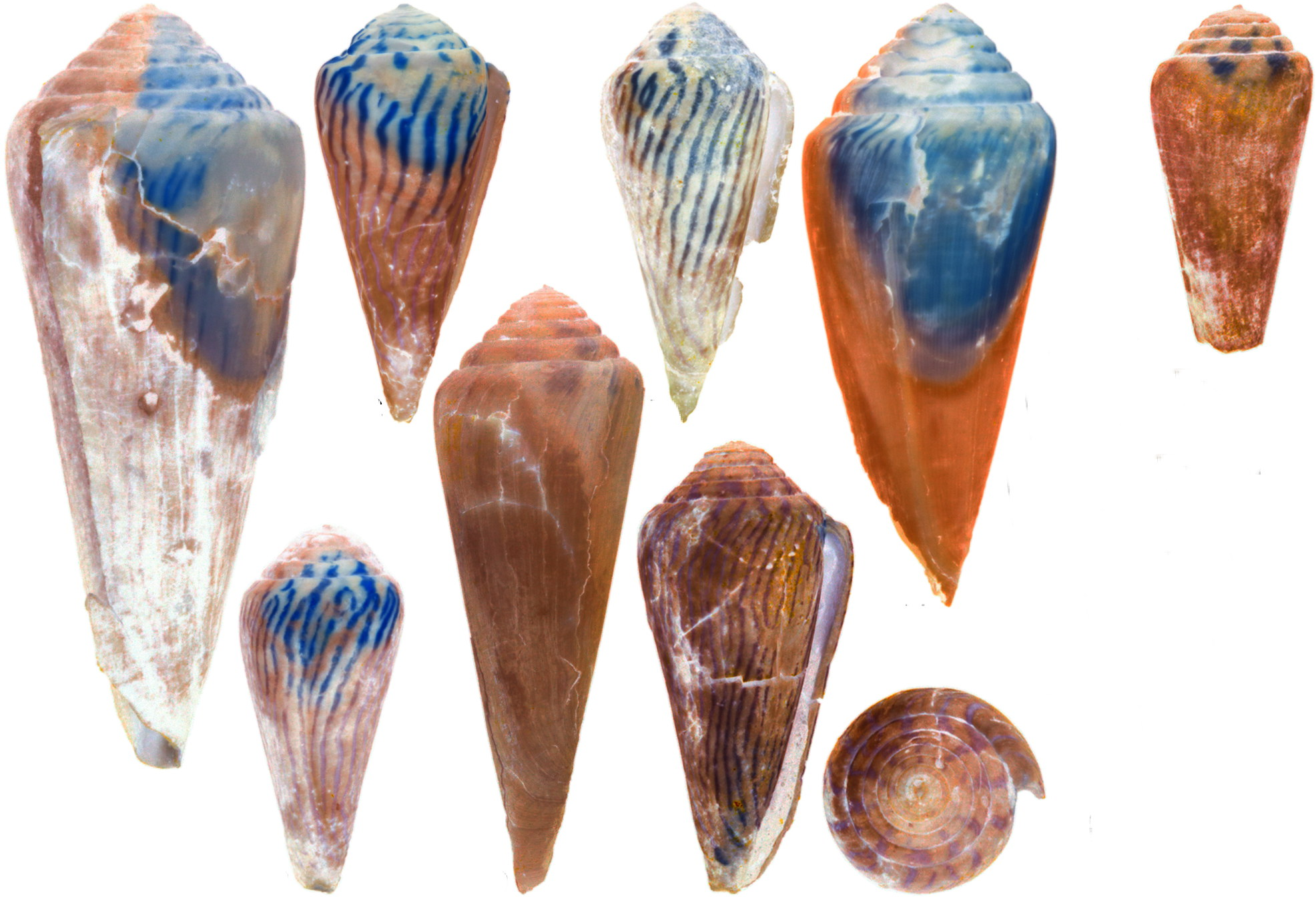
- Several images of Conus olssoni; all image are reversed images photographed under UV light.

Conservation status
- Extinct (IUCN 3.1)

Scientific classification
- Kingdom: Animalia
- Phylum: Mollusca
- Class: Gastropoda
- Subclass: Caenogastropoda
- Order: Neogastropoda
- Superfamily: Conoidea
- Family: Conidae
- Genus: Conus
- Species: †C. olssoni

Binomial name
- †Conus olssoni Maury, 1917

Synonyms
- † Conus (Atlanticonus) olssoni Maury, 1917 † · accepted, alternate representation; † Dauciconus olssoni (Maury), Tucker and Tenorio, 2009

= Conus olssoni =

Conus olssoni Temporal range: Neogene

Species of sea snail

Conus olssoni is an extinct species of sea snail, a marine gastropod mollusk in the family Conidae, the cone snails, cone shells or cones.

== Description ==
The size of the shell varies between 22 mm and 46 mm.

== Distribution ==
This extinct species is known in the fossil state from the Neogene of the Dominican Republic.
