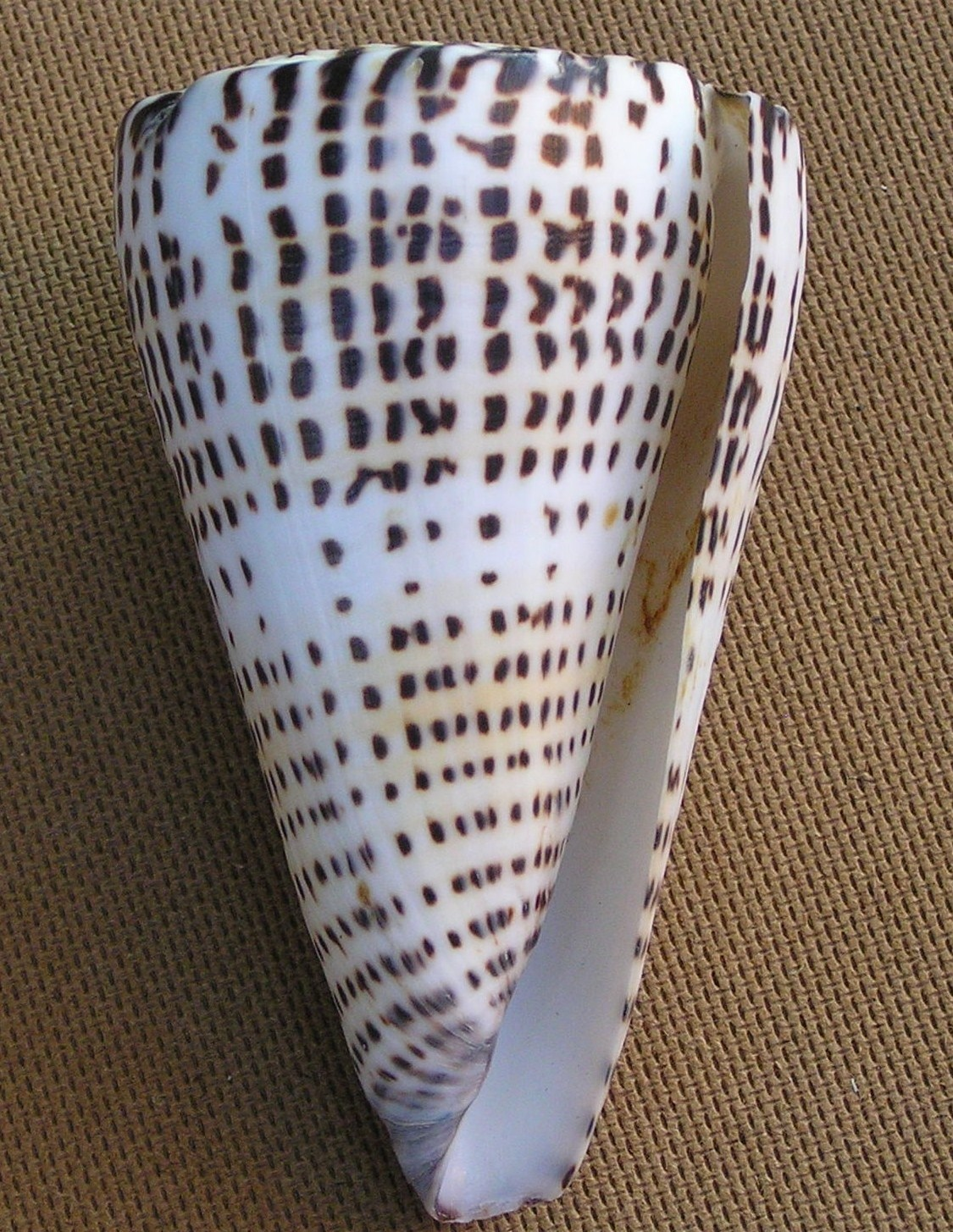
- A shell of Conus leopardus, anterior end towards the bottom of the image

Conservation status
- Least Concern (IUCN 3.1)

Scientific classification
- Kingdom: Animalia
- Phylum: Mollusca
- Class: Gastropoda
- Subclass: Caenogastropoda
- Order: Neogastropoda
- Superfamily: Conoidea
- Family: Conidae
- Genus: Conus
- Species: C. leopardus

Binomial name
- Conus leopardus (Röding, 1798)

Synonyms
- Conus (Lithoconus) leopardus (Röding, 1798) · accepted, alternate representation; Conus millepunctatus Lamarck, 1822; Conus millepunctatus var. aldrovandi Dautzenberg, 1937; Conus pardus Link, 1807; Cucullus leopardus Röding, 1798 (original combination); Lithoconus leopardus (Röding, 1798)

= Conus leopardus =

Species of sea snail

Conus leopardus, common name the leopard cone, is a species of predatory sea snail, a marine gastropod mollusk in the family Conidae, the cone snails, cone shells, or cones.

Like all species within the genus Conus, these snails are predatory and venomous. They are capable of stinging humans, therefore live ones should be handled carefully or not at all.

== Description ==
The size of an adult shell varies between 50 mm and 222 mm.

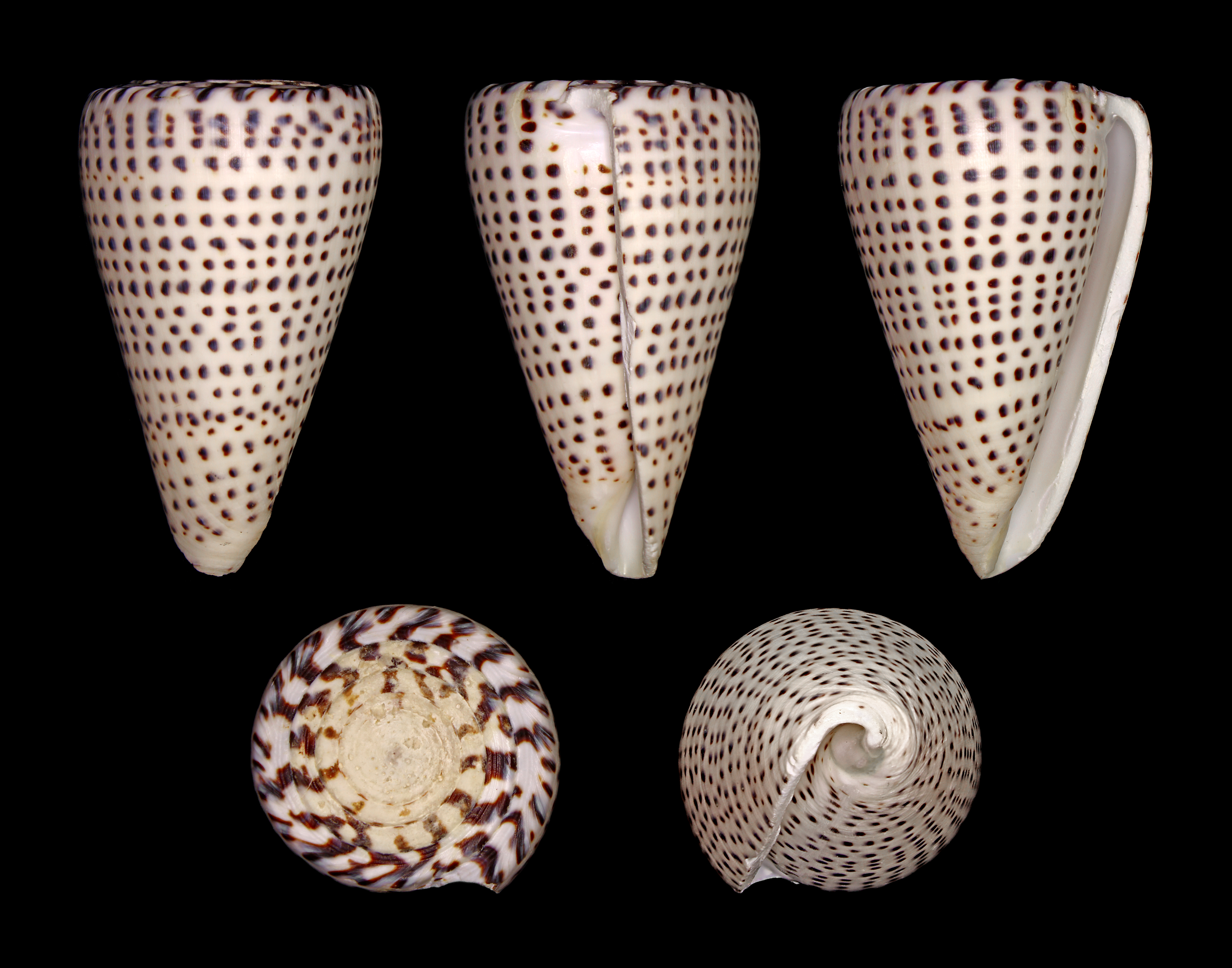
shell of Conus leopardus

== Distribution ==
This marine species occurs in the Indian Ocean off Aldabra, Chagos, Madagascar, the Mascarene basin, Mauritius, and Tanzania; in the entire Indo-Pacific Region; off Australia (Northern Territory, Queensland, Western Australia).

== See also ==
- Conus leopardus Dillwyn, 1817 is a synonym of Conus vexillum Gmelin, 1791

== Gallery ==
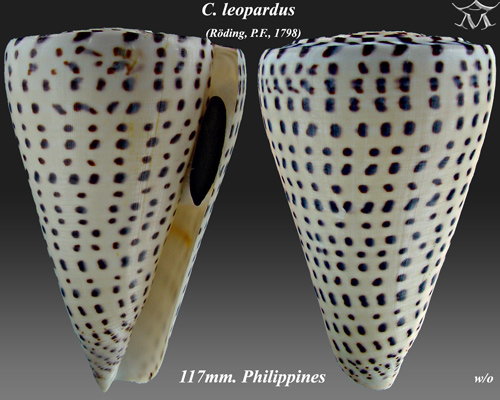
Conus leopardus (Röding, P.F., 1798)

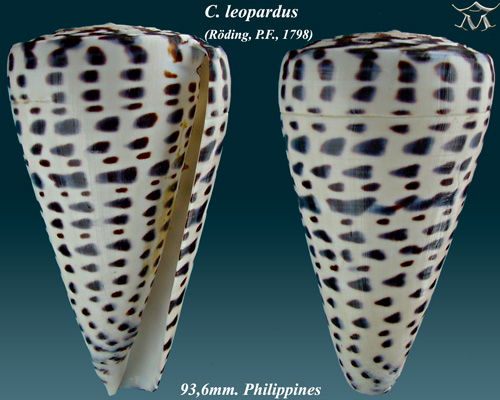
Conus leopardus (Röding, P.F., 1798)

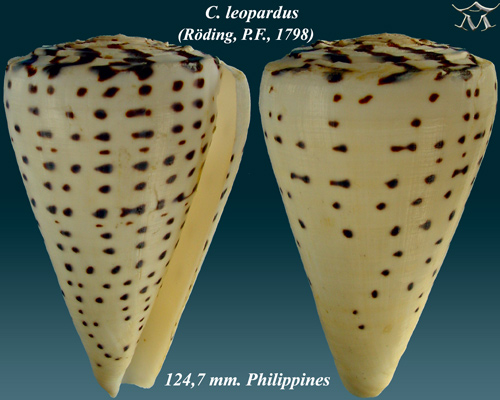
Conus leopardus (Röding, P.F., 1798)
