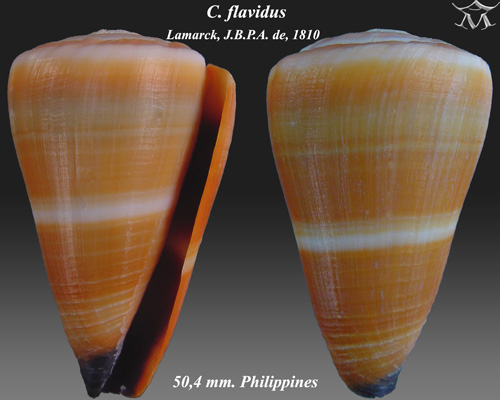
- Apertural and abapertural views of shell of Conus flavidus Lamarck, J.B.P.A. de, 1810

Conservation status
- Least Concern (IUCN 3.1)

Scientific classification
- Kingdom: Animalia
- Phylum: Mollusca
- Class: Gastropoda
- Subclass: Caenogastropoda
- Order: Neogastropoda
- Superfamily: Conoidea
- Family: Conidae
- Genus: Conus
- Species: C. flavidus

Binomial name
- Conus flavidus Lamarck, 1810

Synonyms
- Conus (Virgiconus) flavidus Lamarck, 1810 accepted, alternate representation; Conus erythraeozonatus Barros e Cunha, 1933; Conus neglectus Pease, 1861 (junior homonym of Conus neglectus A. Adams, 1854); Lithoconus peasei Brazier, 1877; Virgiconus flavidus Lamarck, 1810

= Conus flavidus =

Species of sea snail

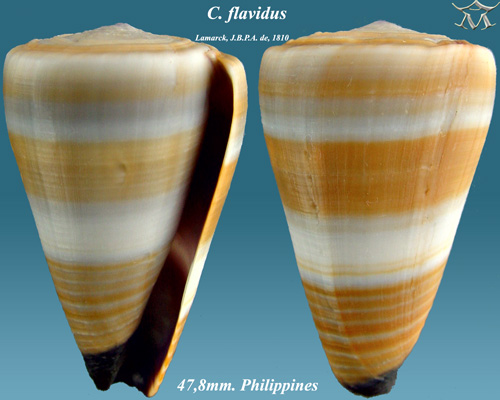
Conus flavidus Lamarck, J.B.P.A. de, 1810

Conus flavidus, common name the flavid Pacific cone, is a species of sea snail, a marine gastropod mollusk in the family Conidae, the cone snails and their allies.

Like all species within the genus Conus, these snails are predatory and venomous. They are capable of stinging humans, therefore live ones should be handled carefully or not at all.

== Description ==
Body whorl with finely beaded spiral cords, which are stronger anteriorly. Sides of body whorl nearly straight; interior purple. Shoulder smooth. Maximum shell length 7.5 cm, commonly to 4 cm.

The color of the shell is yellowish to orange-brown, with an obscure lighter band below the shoulder and in the middle, encircled by ridged striae, sometimes nearly obsolete above. The base of the shell is stained purple. The aperture is orange or violaceous, with a white central band. This species feeds mainly on small coral fishes.

== Distribution ==
This marine species occurs in the Red Sea and has a wide distribution throughout the Indo-Pacific; also off Australia (Northern Territory, Queensland, Western Australia). It is common on reef areas, usually under boulders and corals during the day. It can be found in intertidal and shallow sublittoral zones to a depth of about 10 m.

== Gallery ==
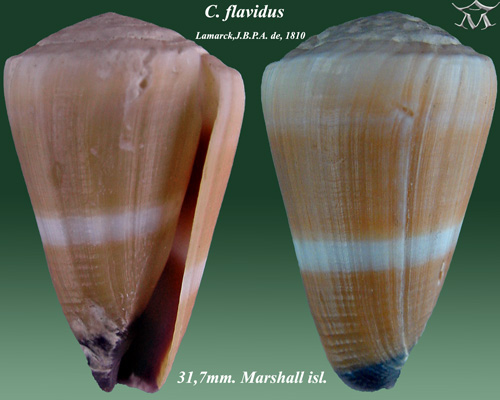
Conus flavidus Lamarck, J.B.P.A. de, 1810

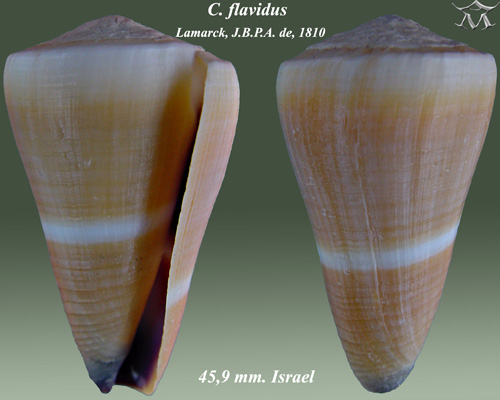
Conus flavidus Lamarck, J.B.P.A. de, 1810

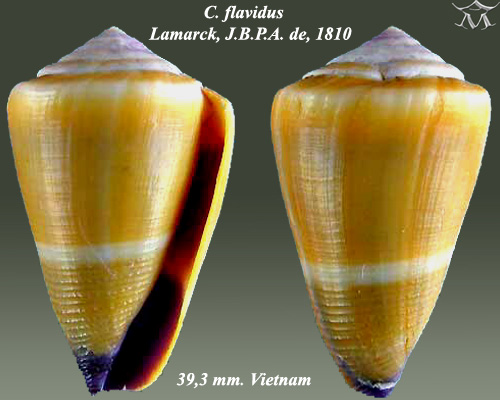
Conus flavidus Lamarck, J.B.P.A. de, 1810

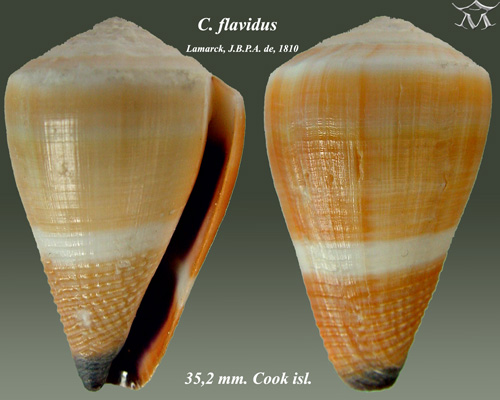
Conus flavidus Lamarck, J.B.P.A. de, 1810

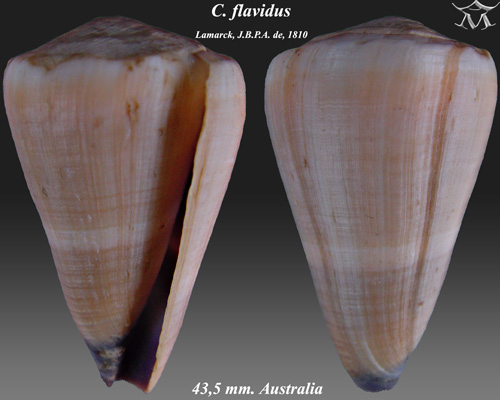
Conus flavidus Lamarck, J.B.P.A. de, 1810

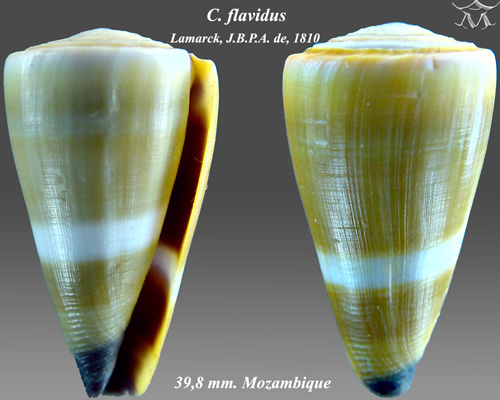
Conus flavidus Lamarck, J.B.P.A. de, 1810
