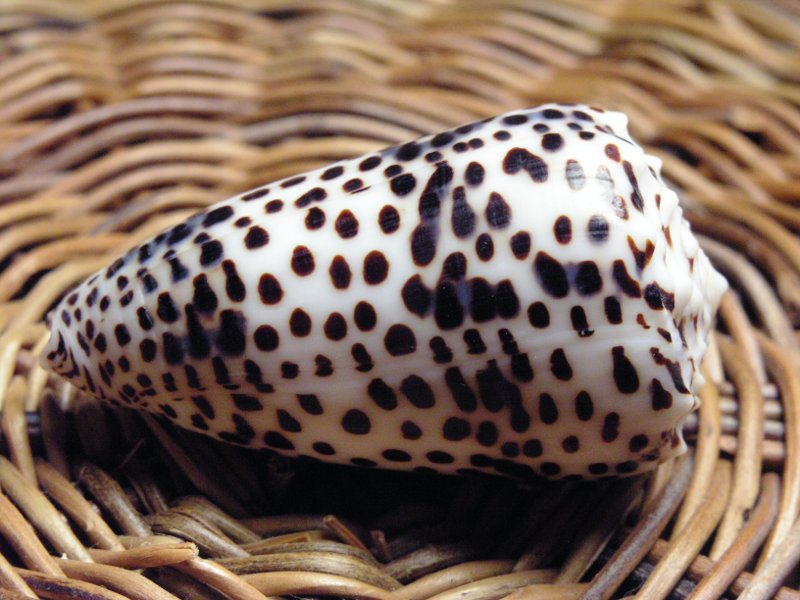
- A shell of Conus eburneus

Conservation status
- Least Concern (IUCN 3.1)

Scientific classification
- Kingdom: Animalia
- Phylum: Mollusca
- Class: Gastropoda
- Subclass: Caenogastropoda
- Order: Neogastropoda
- Superfamily: Conoidea
- Family: Conidae
- Genus: Conus
- Species: C. eburneus

Binomial name
- Conus eburneus Hwass in Bruguière, 1792

Synonyms
- Conus (Tesselliconus) eburneus Hwass in Bruguière, 1792 accepted, alternate representation; Conus alternatus Link, H.F., 1807; Conus crassus Sowerby ii, 1857; Conus polyglotta Weinkauff, 1874; Conus quadratulus Röding, 1798; Lithoconus eburneus (Hwass in Bruguière, 1792); Lithoconus eburneus quadratulus (f) Röding, P.F., 1798; Tesselliconus eburneus (Hwass in Bruguière, 1792)

= Conus eburneus =

Species of sea snail

Conus eburneus, common name the ivory cone, is a species of sea snail, a marine gastropod mollusk in the family Conidae, the cone snails and their allies.

Like all species within the genus Conus, these snails are predatory and venomous. They are capable of stinging humans, therefore live ones should be handled carefully or not at all.

There is one subspecies: Conus eburneus crassus G. B. Sowerby II, 1858 represented as Conus eburneus.

== Description ==
The size of an adult shell varies between 30 mm and 79 mm. The shell is white, usually with two or three light yellowish bands, marked with very dark brown revolving spots.

== Distribution ==
This marine species is found in the tropical Indo-West Pacific from the coast of East Africa (off Madagascar and Chagos) to Australia (the Northern Territory, Queensland and Western Australia), Polynesia and the Ryukyu Islands (but not along Hawaii)

== Gallery ==
Below are several color forms and one subspecies:

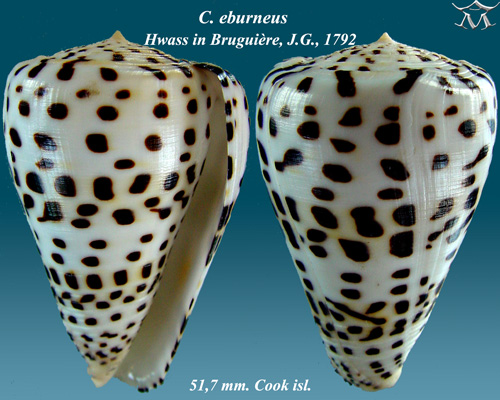
Conus eburneus Hwass in Bruguière, J.G., 1792

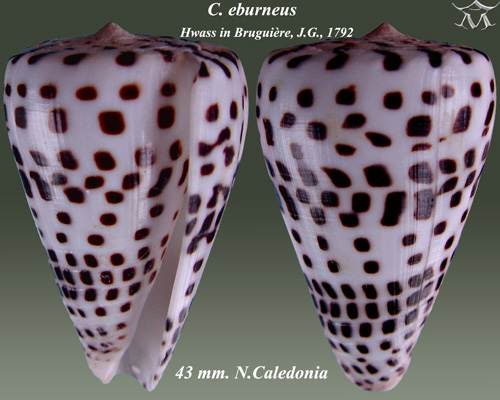
Conus eburneus Hwass in Bruguière, J.G., 1792

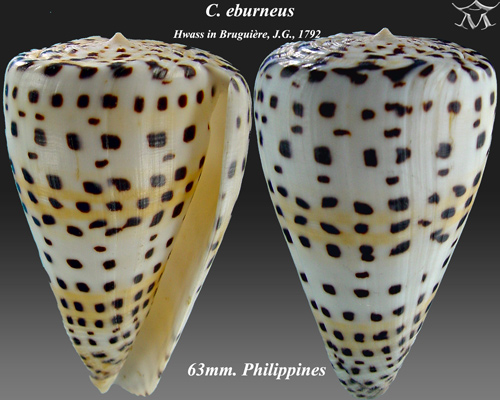
Conus eburneus Hwass in Bruguière, J.G., 1792

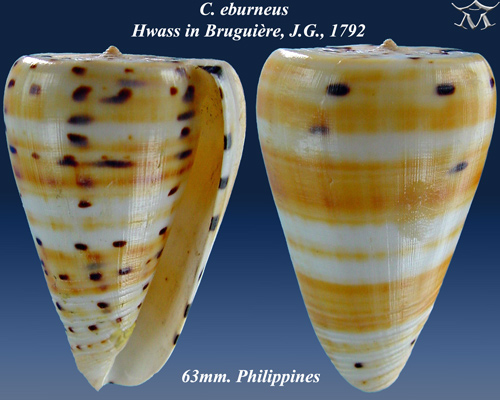
Conus eburneus Hwass in Bruguière, J.G., 1792

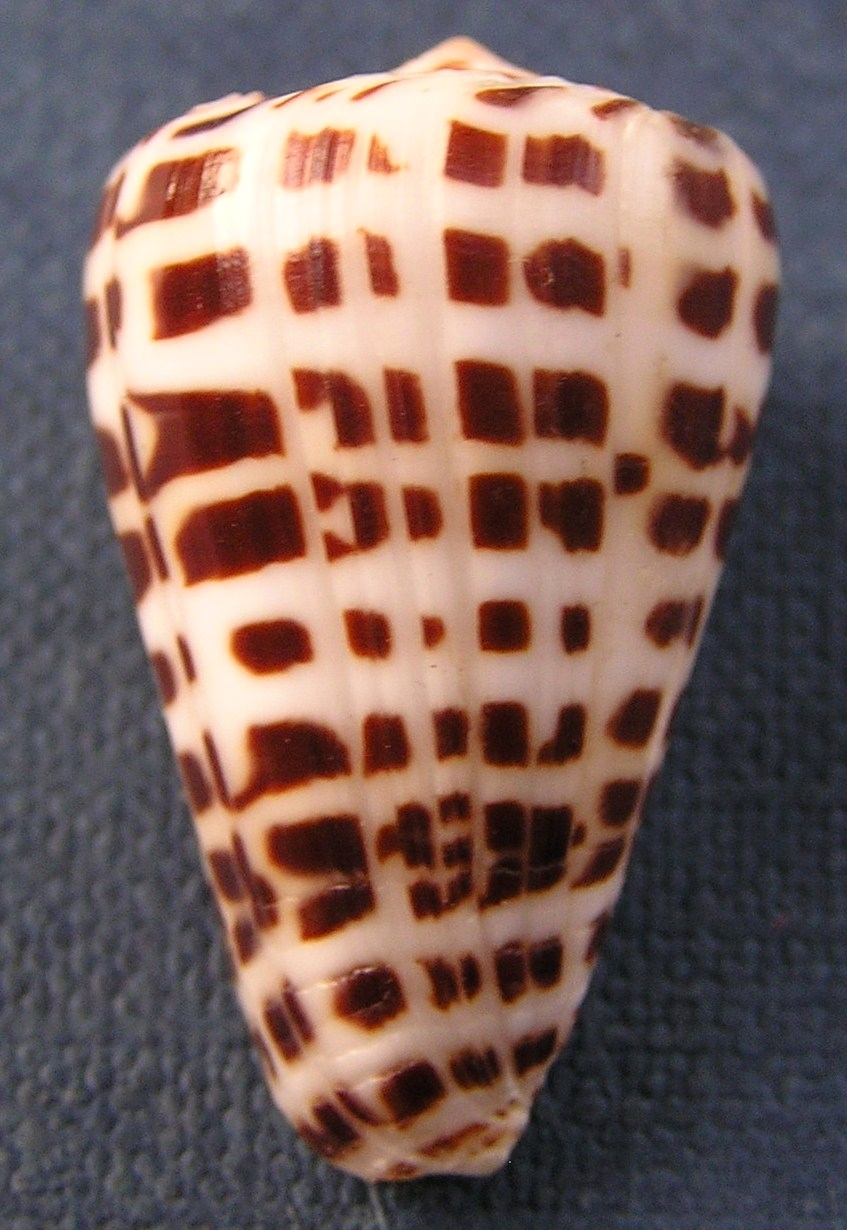
Conus eburneus, abapertural view Hwass in Bruguière, J.G., 1792

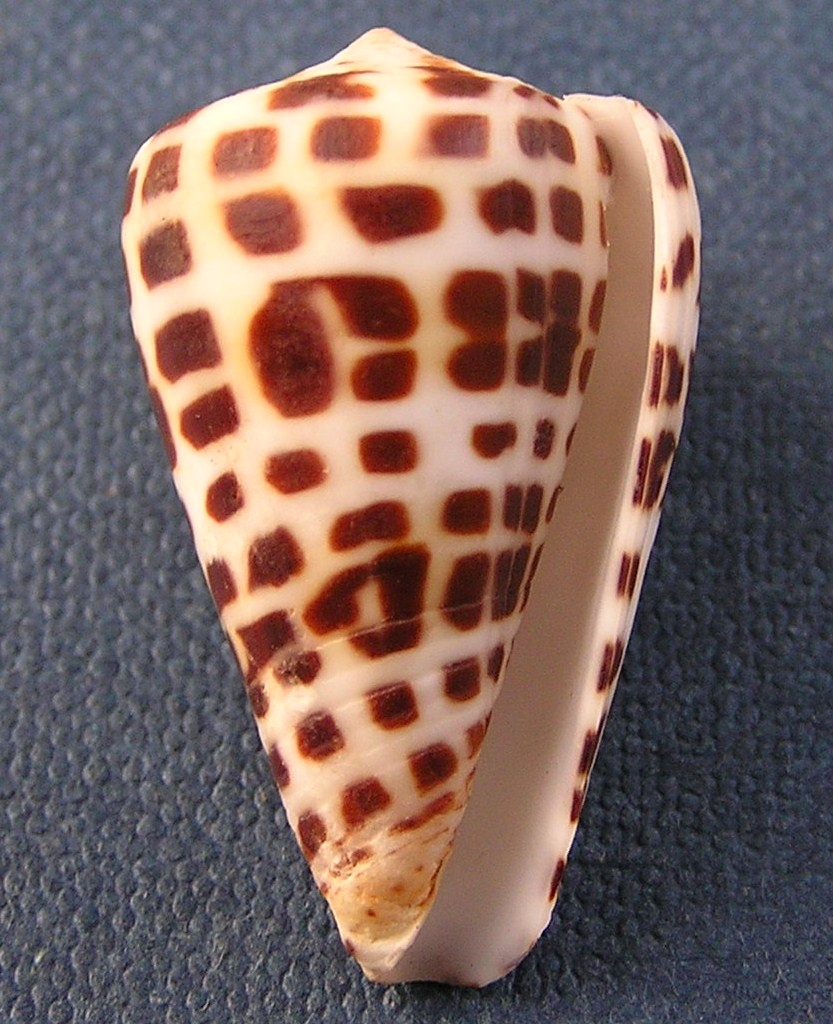
Conus eburneus, apertural view Hwass in Bruguière, J.G., 1792

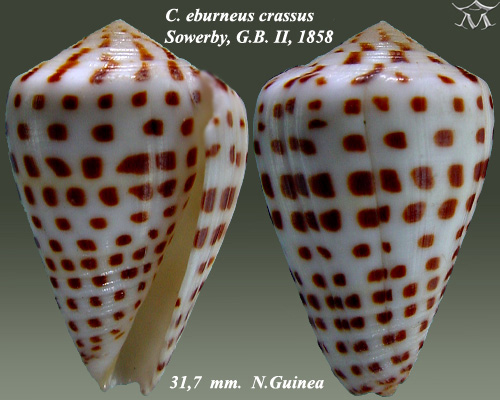
Conus eburneus crassus Sowerby, G.B. II, 1858

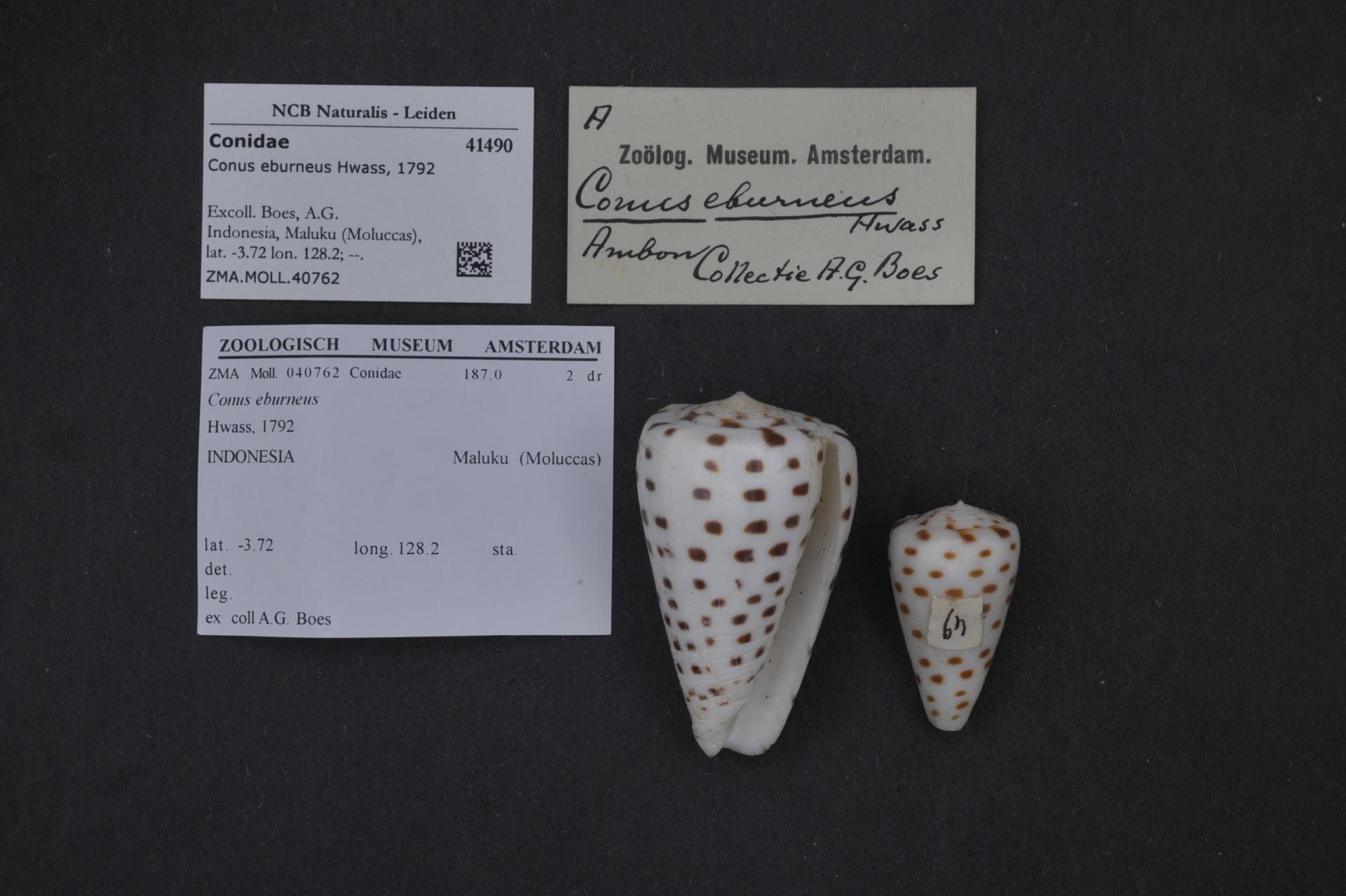
Conus eburneus Hwass, 1792 Museum specimens
