= Conus ritae =

Scientific classification
- Kingdom: Animalia
- Phylum: Mollusca
- Class: Gastropoda
- Subclass: Caenogastropoda
- Order: Neogastropoda
- Superfamily: Conoidea
- Family: Conidae
- Genus: Conus
- Species: C. ritae

Binomial name
- Conus ritae Petuch, 1995

Synonyms
- Atlanticonus ritae (Petuch, 1995); Conus (Atlanticonus) ritae (Petuch, 1995) · accepted, alternate representation; Gladioconus ritae (Petuch, 1995)

Species of sea snail

Conus ritae is a species of sea snail, a marine gastropod mollusk in the family Conidae, the cone snails and their allies.

Like all species within the genus Conus, these snails are predatory and venomous. They are capable of stinging humans, therefore live ones should be handled carefully or not at all.

== Distribution ==
This species occurs in the Caribbean Sea off Honduras.

== Description ==
The maximum recorded shell length is 27.5 mm.

== Habitat ==
Minimum recorded depth is 10 m. Maximum recorded depth is 20 m.
