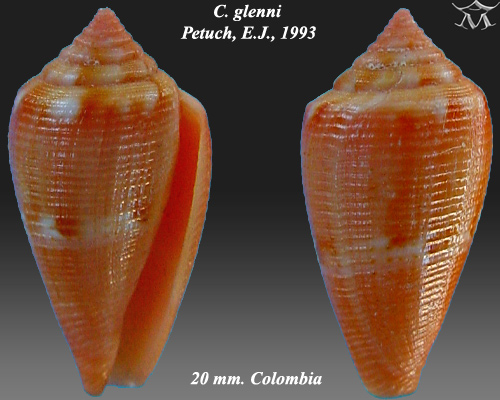
- Apertural and abapertural views of shell of Conus glenni Petuch, E.J., 1993

Conservation status
- Least Concern (IUCN 3.1)

Scientific classification
- Kingdom: Animalia
- Phylum: Mollusca
- Class: Gastropoda
- Subclass: Caenogastropoda
- Order: Neogastropoda
- Superfamily: Conoidea
- Family: Conidae
- Genus: Conus
- Species: C. glenni

Binomial name
- Conus glenni Petuch, 1993

Synonyms
- Atlanticonus glenni (Petuch, 1993); Conus (Atlanticonus) glenni (Petuch, 1993) · accepted, alternate representation; Gladioconus glenni (Petuch, 1993)

= Conus glenni =

Species of sea snail

Conus glenni, common name the Effulgent cone, is a species of sea snail, a marine gastropod mollusk in the family Conidae, the cone snails and their allies.

Like all species within the genus Conus, these snails are predatory and venomous. They are capable of stinging humans, therefore live ones should be handled carefully or not at all.

== Distribution ==
This species occurs in the Caribbean Sea off Panama and Colombia.

== Description ==
The maximum recorded shell length is 18.5 mm.

== Habitat ==
Minimum recorded depth is 1 m. Maximum recorded depth is 1 m.
