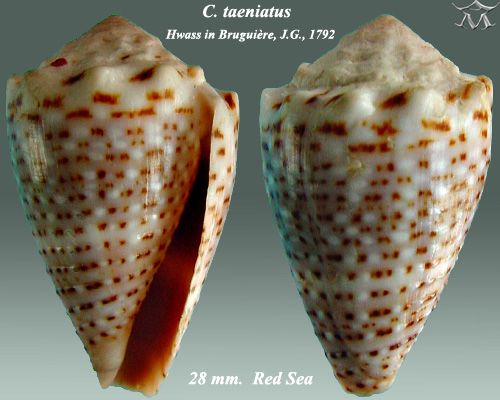
- Apertural and abapertural views of shell of Conus taeniatus Hwass in Bruguière, J.G., 1792
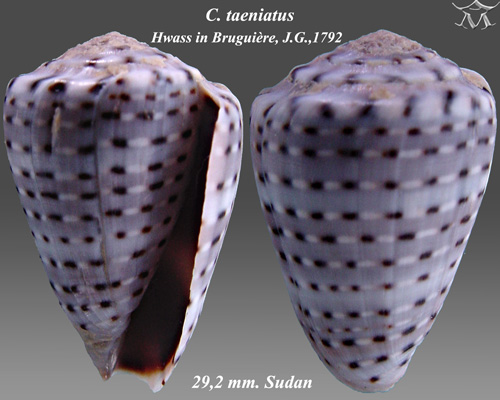

Conservation status
- Least Concern (IUCN 3.1)

Scientific classification
- Kingdom: Animalia
- Phylum: Mollusca
- Class: Gastropoda
- Subclass: Caenogastropoda
- Order: Neogastropoda
- Superfamily: Conoidea
- Family: Conidae
- Genus: Conus
- Species: C. taeniatus

Binomial name
- Conus taeniatus Hwass in Bruguière, 1792

Synonyms
- Conus (Virroconus) taeniatus Hwass in Bruguière, 1792 · accepted, alternate representation; Conus africanus "Meuschen, F.C." Dillwyn, L.W., 1817; Conus fernambucinus Röding, P.F., 1798; Cucullus fernambucinus Röding, 1798; Conus genuinus Röding, P.F., 1798; Cucullus genuinus Röding, 1798; Miliariconus taeniatus (Hwass in Bruguière, 1792)

= Conus taeniatus =

Species of sea snail

Conus taeniatus, common name the ringed cone, is a species of sea snail, a marine gastropod mollusk in the family Conidae, the cone snails and their allies.

Like all species within the genus Conus, these snails are predatory and venomous. They are capable of stinging humans, therefore live ones should be handled carefully or not at all.

== Description ==
The size of the shell varies between 15 mm and 50 mm. The shell is indistinctly zoned alternately with pale violaceous and white, vividly encircled with fillets of dark chocolate and white articulations. The spire is obsoletely coronated.

== Distribution ==
This marine species occurs in the Red Sea, the Strait of Hormuz and off Kenya.
