= Conus cuna =

Scientific classification
- Kingdom: Animalia
- Phylum: Mollusca
- Class: Gastropoda
- Subclass: Caenogastropoda
- Order: Neogastropoda
- Superfamily: Conoidea
- Family: Conidae
- Genus: Conus
- Species: C. cuna

Binomial name
- Conus cuna Petuch, 1998

Synonyms
- Atlanticonus cuna (Petuch, 1998); Conus (Atlanticonus) cuna (Petuch, 1998) · accepted, alternate representation; Gladioconus cuna (Petuch, 1998)

Species of sea snail

Conus cuna is a species of sea snail, a marine gastropod mollusk in the family Conidae, the cone snails and their allies.

Like all species within the genus Conus, these snails are predatory and venomous. They are capable of stinging humans, therefore live ones should be handled carefully or not at all.

== Distribution ==
This species occurs in the Caribbean Sea off Panama.

== Description ==
The maximum recorded shell length is 23 mm.

== Habitat ==
Minimum recorded depth is 3 m. Maximum recorded depth is 3 m.
