= Conus tessulatus =

- A shell of Conus tessulatus

Scientific classification
- Kingdom: Animalia
- Phylum: Mollusca
- Class: Gastropoda
- Subclass: Caenogastropoda
- Order: Neogastropoda
- Superfamily: Conoidea
- Family: Conidae
- Genus: Conus
- Species: C. tessulatus

Binomial name
- Conus tessulatus Born, 1778

Synonyms
- Conus (Tesselliconus) tessulatus Born, 1778 · accepted, alternate representation; Cucullus pavimentum Röding, 1798; Dendroconus tessulatus (Born, 1778); Lithoconus tessulatus (Born, 1778); Tesselliconus tessulatus (Born, 1778)

Species of sea snail

Conus tessulatus, common name the tessellated cone, is a species of sea snail, a marine gastropod mollusk in the family Conidae, the cone snails and their allies.

Like all species within the genus Conus, these snails are predatory and venomous. They are capable of stinging humans, therefore live ones should be handled carefully or not at all.

== Description ==
The size of the shell varies between 22 mm and 82 mm. The top is rather flat with a rather pointed spire and rounded shoulders. The ground color of the shell is white, covered with bands red, chestnut or orange squares and rectangles. The base of the shell is sometimes tinged with black.

== Distribution ==

Conus tessulatus has perhaps the largest range of any known species of Cone snail. Its habitat ranges from the east coast of Africa across the Indian Ocean and Pacific Ocean to the west coast of Central America from Western Mexico to Costa Rica; also off Australia (Northern Territory, Queensland, Western Australia)

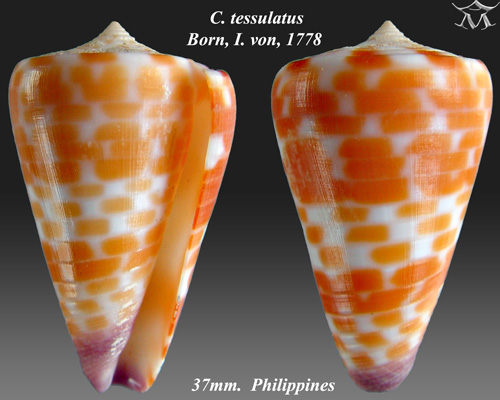
Conus tessulatus Born, I. von, 1778

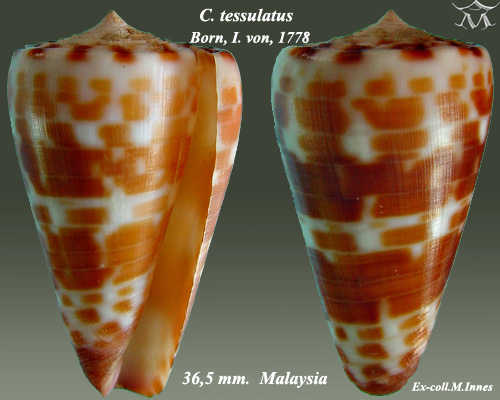
Conus tessulatus Born, I. von, 1778

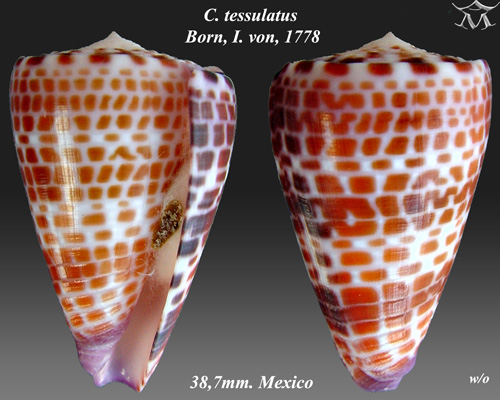
Conus tessulatus Born, I. von, 1778
