= Conus sandwichensis =

Scientific classification
- Kingdom: Animalia
- Phylum: Mollusca
- Class: Gastropoda
- Subclass: Caenogastropoda
- Order: Neogastropoda
- Superfamily: Conoidea
- Family: Conidae
- Genus: Conus
- Species: C. sandwichensis

Binomial name
- Conus sandwichensis Walls, 1978

Synonyms
- Conus (Tesselliconus) sandwichensis Walls, 1978 · accepted, alternate representation; Conus suturatus sandwichensis Walls, 1978 (original combination); Lithoconus sandwichensis (Walls, 1978); Tesselliconus sandwichensis (Walls, 1978)

Species of sea snail

Conus sandwichensis, common name the Hawaiian cone, is a species of sea snail, a marine gastropod mollusk in the family Conidae, the cone snails, cone shells or cones.

These snails are predatory and venomous. They are capable of stinging humans.

== Description ==
The size of the shell varies between 14 mm and 47 mm.

== Distribution ==
This marine species is endemic to Hawaii.
