= Gotthelf Fischer von Waldheim =

German scientist (1771–1853)

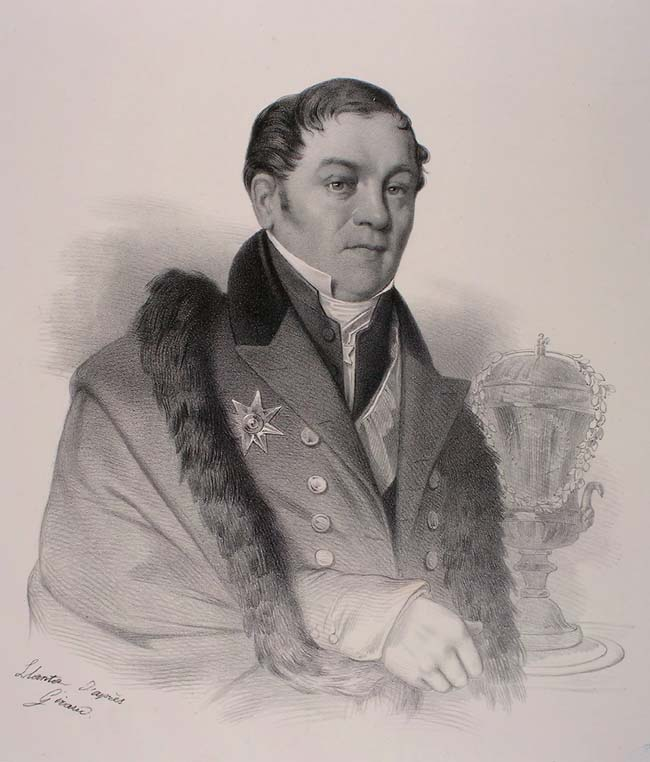
- Gotthelf Fischer von Waldheim
- Born: Gotthilf Fischer; 13 October 1771; Waldheim, Electorate of Saxony
- Died: 18 October 1853 (aged 82); Moscow, Russian Empire
- Other name: Григо́рий Ива́нович Фи́шер фон Ва́льдгейм
- Education: University of Leipzig
- Occupations: Anatomist, entomologist and paleontologist.
- Known for: Classification of invertebrates, Entomographia Imperii Rossici
- Scientific career
- Institutions: University of Mainz, Moscow University
- Author abbrev. (botany): G.Fisch.Waldh.
- Author abbrev. (zoology): G. Fischer, Fischer de Waldheim, Fischer von Waldheim

Gotthelf Fischer von Waldheim (Russian: Григо́рий Ива́нович Фи́шер фон Ва́льдгейм, romanized: Grigórij Ivánovič Fíšer fon Vál'dgejm; 13 October 1771 – 18 October 1853) was a Saxon anatomist, entomologist and paleontologist who spent most of his adult life in Russia.

Fischer was born as Gotthilf Fischer in Waldheim, Saxony, the son of a linen weaver. He studied medicine at Leipzig. He travelled to Vienna and Paris with his friend Alexander von Humboldt and studied under Georges Cuvier. He took up a professorship at Mainz, and then in 1804, became Professor of Natural History and Director of the Demidov Natural History Museum at the Moscow University. In August 1805, he founded the Société Impériale des Naturalistes de Moscou. Fischer was elected a Foreign Honorary Member of the American Academy of Arts and Sciences in 1812 and a member of the American Philosophical Society in 1818.

Fischer was mainly engaged in the classification of invertebrates, the result of which was his Entomographia Imperii Rossici (1820–1851). He also spent time studying fossils from the area around Moscow.

Due to his work studying the insects of Russia, the Russian government granted him nobility as well as the "von Waldheim" ending to his name.

== Partial list of publications ==
- Versuch über die Schwimmblase der Fische, Leipzig 1795
- Mémoire pour servir d'introduction à un ouvrage sur la respiration des animaux, Paris 1798
- J. Ingenhousz über Ernährung der Pflanzen und Fruchtbarkeit des Bodens aus dem Englischen übersetzt und mit Anmerkungen versehen von Gotthelf Fischer. Nebst einer Einleitung über einige Gegenstände der Pflanzenphysiologie von F. A. von Humboldt, Leipzig 1798
- Ueber die verschiedene Form des Intermaxillarknochens in verschiedenen Thieren, Leipzig 1800
- Beschreibung einiger typographischer Seltenheiten. Nebst Beyträgen zur Erfindungsgeschichte der Buchdruckerkunst, Mainz und Nürnberg 1800
- Naturhistorische Fragmente, Frankfurt am Main 1801
- Beschreibung typographischer Seltenheiten und merkwürdiger Handschriften nebst Beyträgen zur Erfindungsgeschichte der Buchdruckerkunst, Mainz um 1801
- Essai sur les monuments typographiques de Jean Gutenberg, Mayençais, inventeur de l'imprimerie, Mainz 1801/1802
- Das Nationalmuseum der Naturgeschichte zu Paris, 1802
- Vorlesungen über vergleichende Anatomie, deutsche Übersetzung der Vorlesungen Georges Cuviers, Braunschweig 1801–1802
- Lettre au citoyen E. Geoffroy ... sur une ouvelle espèce de Loris : accompagnée de la description d'un craniomètre de nouvelle invention, Mainz 1804
- Anatomie der Maki und der ihnen verwandten Thiere, Frankfurt am Main 1804
- Tableaux synoptiques de zoognose, 1805
- Museum Demidoff, ou catalogue systématique et raisonné des curiosités etc. donnés a l'université de Moscou par Paul de Demidoff, Moskau 1806
- Muséum d'Histoire naturelle de l'université impériale de Moscou, 18069
- Notices sur les fossiles de Moscou, 1809–1811
- Notices d'un animal fossile de Sibérie, 1811
- Onomasticon du Système d'Oryctognoise, 1811
- Zoognosia tabulis synopticis illustrata, in usum prälectionum Academiae Imperialis Medico-Chirurgicae Mosquentis edita, Moskau 1813
- Observations sur quelques Diptères de Russie, 1813
- Essai sur la Turquoie et sur la Calaite, Moskau 1816
- Adversaria zoologica, 1817–1823
- Entomographie de la Russie, Moskau 1820–1851
- Prodromus Petromatognosiae animalium systematicae, continens bibliographiam animalium fossilium, Moskau 1829–1832
- Oryctographie du gouvernement de Moscou, 1830–1837
- Bibliographia Palaeonthologica Animalium Systematica, Moskau 1834
- Einige Worte an die Mainzer, bei der Feierlichkeit des dem Erfinder der Buchdruckerkunst Johann Gutenberg in Mainz zu errichtenden Denkmals, Moskau 1836
- Recherches sur les ossements fossiles de la Russie, Moskau 1836–1839
- Spicilegium entomoraphiae Rossicae, Moskau 1844

== Sources ==
- "Фишер фон Вальдгейм, Готтхельф" . Brockhaus and Efron Encyclopedic Dictionary (in Russian). 1906.
