= Tachys =

- Tachys vittatus

Scientific classification
- Kingdom: Animalia
- Phylum: Arthropoda
- Clade: Pancrustacea
- Class: Insecta
- Order: Coleoptera
- Suborder: Adephaga
- Family: Carabidae
- Subfamily: Trechinae
- Tribe: Bembidiini
- Genus: Tachys; Dejean, 1821

Synonyms
- Polyderis; Paratachys

Genus of beetles

Tachys is a genus of ground beetles in the family Carabidae. There are at least 270 described species in the genus Tachys.

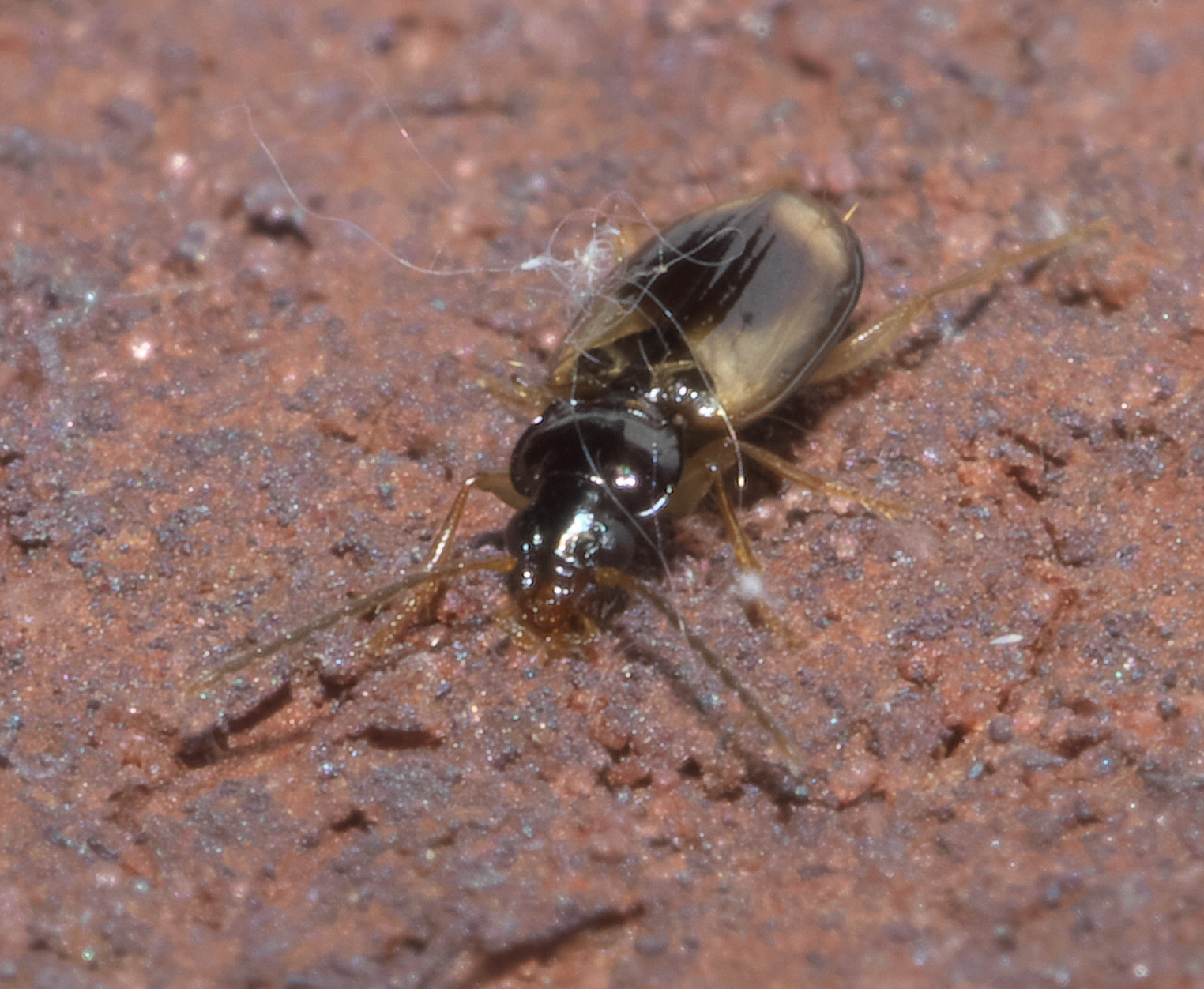
Tachys proximus

== See also ==
- List of Tachys species
