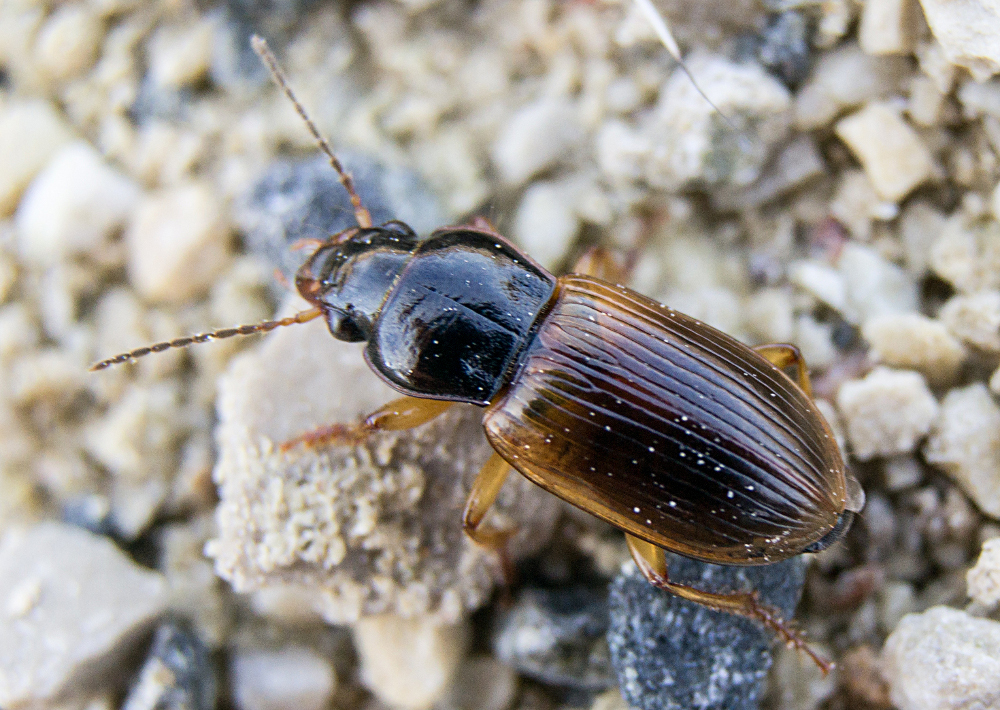
- Anisodactylus sanctaecrucis, Illinois

Scientific classification
- Kingdom: Animalia
- Phylum: Arthropoda
- Class: Insecta
- Order: Coleoptera
- Suborder: Adephaga
- Family: Carabidae
- Subfamily: Harpalinae
- Tribe: Anisodactylini; Lacordaire, 1854

= Anisodactylini =

Tribe of ground beetles

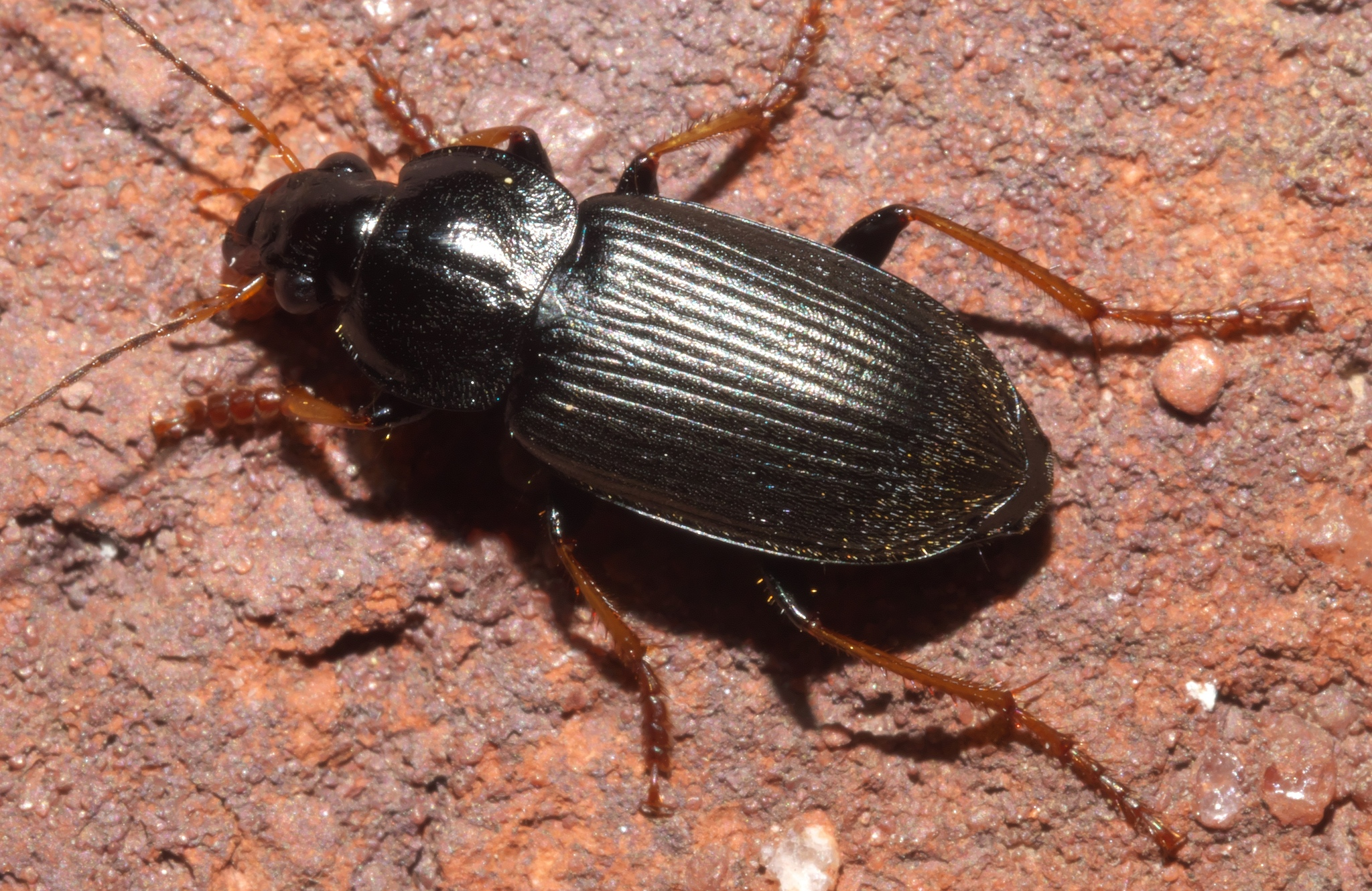
Amphasia sericea, Oklahoma

Anisodactylini is a tribe of ground beetles in the family Carabidae. There are more than 30 genera and 380 described species in Anisodactylini.

== Genera ==
These 31 genera belong to the tribe Anisodactylini:

- Allendia Noonan, 1974
- Allocinopus Broun, 1903
- Amphasia Newman, 1838
- Anisodactylus Dejean, 1829
- Anisostichus Emden, 1953
- Cenogmus Sloane, 1898
- Chydaeus Chaudoir, 1854
- Crasodactylus Guérin-Méneville, 1847
- Criniventer Emden, 1953
- Diachromus Erichson, 1837
- Dicheirus Mannerheim, 1843
- Gaioxenus Broun, 1910
- Geopinus LeConte, 1847
- Gnathaphanus W.S.MacLeay, 1825
- Gynandromorphus Dejean, 1829
- Haplaner Chaudoir, 1878
- Harpalomimetes Schauberger in Csiki, 1932
- Hypharpax W.S.MacLeay, 1825
- Maoriharpalus Larochelle & Larivière, 2005
- Nornalupia Kataev, 2002
- Notiobia Perty, 1830
- Parabaris Broun, 1881
- Progonochaetus G.Müller, 1938
- Pseudanisotarsus Noonan, 1973
- Pseudognathaphanus Schauberger, 1932
- Pseudorhysopus Kataev & Wrase, 2001
- Rhysopus Andrewes, 1929
- Scybalicus Schaum, 1862
- Triplosarus Bates, 1874
- Tuiharpalus Larochelle & Larivière, 2005
- Xestonotus LeConte, 1853
