= Nornalup =

Nornalup may refer to:

- Nornalup, Western Australia, a locality in the Shire of Denmark
- Nornalup, the original name of Walpole, Western Australia
- Nornalup Inlet, an inlet in Western Australia
- Nornalupia, a genus in the beetle family Carabidae
- Nornalup branch railway, the Elleker to Nornalup railway line
