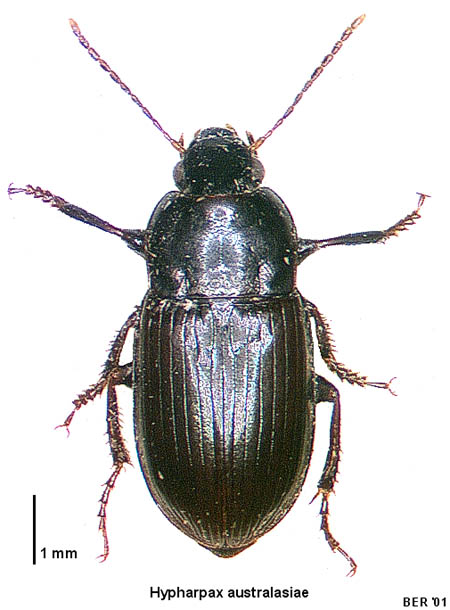

Scientific classification
- Domain: Eukaryota
- Kingdom: Animalia
- Phylum: Arthropoda
- Class: Insecta
- Order: Coleoptera
- Suborder: Adephaga
- Family: Carabidae
- Subfamily: Harpalinae
- Tribe: Anisodactylini
- Genus: Hypharpax; W.S.MacLeay, 1825

= Hypharpax =

Genus of beetles

Hypharpax is a genus in the beetle family Carabidae. There are more than 20 described species in Hypharpax.

== Species ==
These 28 species belong to the genus Hypharpax:

- Hypharpax aereus (Dejean, 1829) (Australia)
- Hypharpax antarcticus (Laporte, 1867) (New Zealand)
- Hypharpax assimilis (W.J.MacLeay, 1888) (Australia)
- Hypharpax australis (Dejean, 1829) (Australia and New Zealand)
- Hypharpax bostockii (Laporte, 1867) (Australia)
- Hypharpax celebensis Chaudoir, 1878 (Indonesia)
- Hypharpax convexiusculus (W.J.MacLeay, 1871) (Australia)
- Hypharpax dentipes (Wiedemann, 1823) (Indonesia and New Guinea)
- Hypharpax deyrollei (Laporte, 1867) (Australia)
- Hypharpax flavitarsis Chaudoir, 1878 (Australia)
- Hypharpax flindersii (Laporte, 1867) (Australia)
- Hypharpax habitans Sloane, 1895 (Australia)
- Hypharpax interioris Sloane, 1895 (Australia)
- Hypharpax kingii (Laporte, 1867) (Australia)
- Hypharpax kreftii (Laporte, 1867) (Australia)
- Hypharpax moestus (Dejean, 1829) (Australia)
- Hypharpax nitens Sloane, 1911 (Australia)
- Hypharpax obsoletus Blackburn, 1892 (Australia)
- Hypharpax peronii (Laporte, 1867) (Australia)
- Hypharpax puncticollis (W.J.MacLeay, 1888) (Australia)
- Hypharpax queenslandicus (Csiki, 1932) (Australia)
- Hypharpax ranula (Laporte, 1867) (Australia)
- Hypharpax rotundipennis Chaudoir, 1878 (Australia)
- Hypharpax sculpturalis (Laporte, 1867) (Australia)
- Hypharpax simplicipes Chaudoir, 1878 (Indonesia)
- Hypharpax sloanei Blackburn, 1891 (Australia)
- Hypharpax subsericeus (W.J.MacLeay, 1888) (Australia)
- Hypharpax vilis Blackburn, 1891 (Australia)
