= Haplaner =

Scientific classification
- Domain: Eukaryota
- Kingdom: Animalia
- Phylum: Arthropoda
- Class: Insecta
- Order: Coleoptera
- Suborder: Adephaga
- Family: Carabidae
- Subfamily: Harpalinae
- Tribe: Anisodactylini
- Genus: Haplaner; Chaudoir, 1878

Genus of beetles

Haplaner is a genus in the beetle family Carabidae. There are at least two described species in Haplaner.

== Species ==
These two species belong to the genus Haplaner:

- Haplaner insulicola Blackburn, 1901 (Australia)
- Haplaner velox (Laporte, 1867) (Australia)
