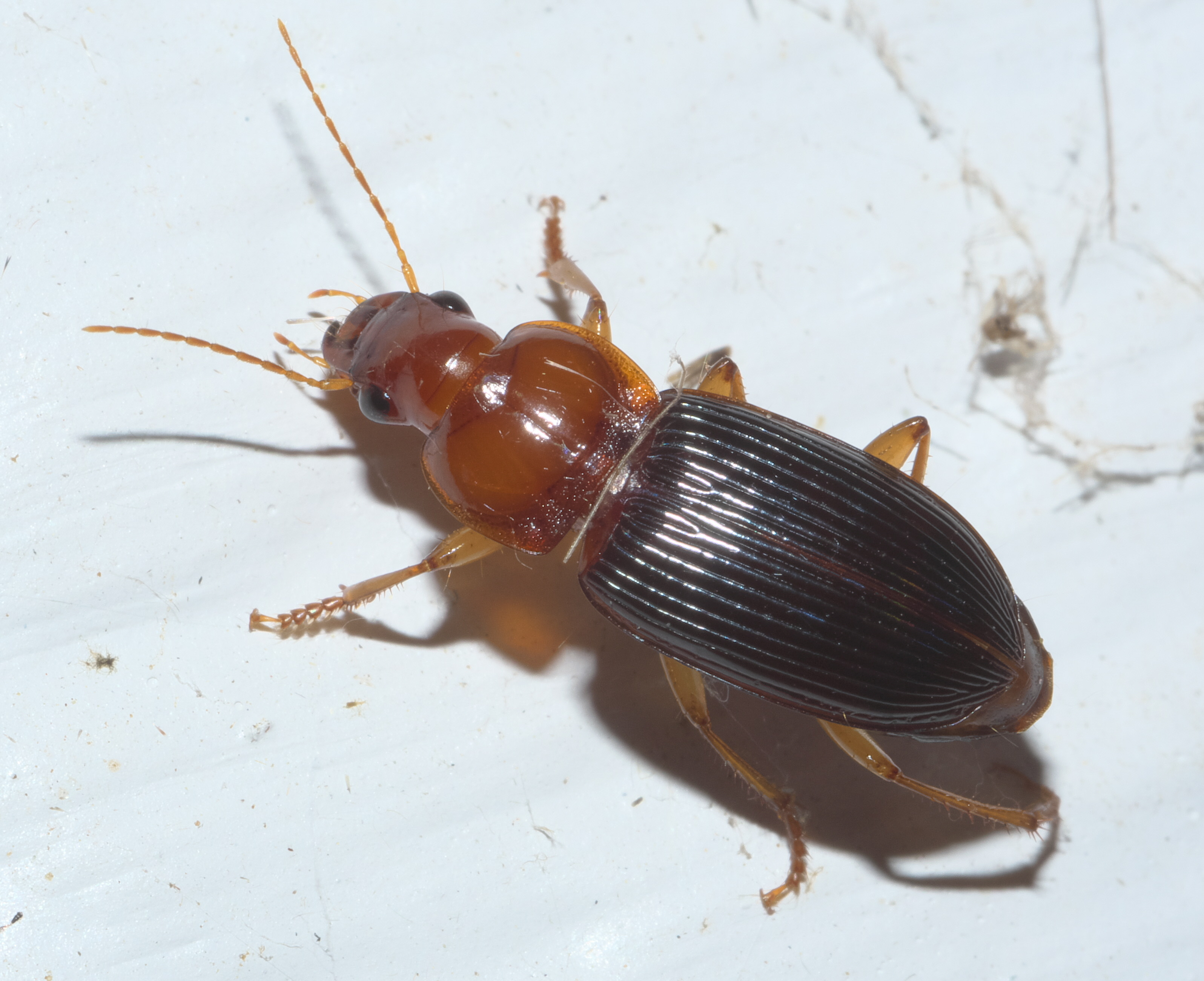

Scientific classification
- Kingdom: Animalia
- Phylum: Arthropoda
- Clade: Pancrustacea
- Class: Insecta
- Order: Coleoptera
- Suborder: Adephaga
- Family: Carabidae
- Genus: Notiobia
- Species: N. terminata

Binomial name
- Notiobia terminata (Say, 1823)

= Notiobia terminata =

Species of beetle

Notiobia terminata is a species of ground beetle in the family Carabidae. It is found in North America.
