= Dicheirus dilatatus =

Scientific classification
- Kingdom: Animalia
- Phylum: Arthropoda
- Class: Insecta
- Order: Coleoptera
- Suborder: Adephaga
- Family: Carabidae
- Tribe: Harpalini
- Subtribe: Anisodactylina
- Genus: Dicheirus
- Species: D. dilatatus

Binomial name
- Dicheirus dilatatus (Dejean, 1829)

Species of beetle

Dicheirus dilatatus is a species of ground beetle in the family Carabidae. It is found in North America.

== Subspecies ==
These two subspecies belong to the species Dicheirus dilatatus:

- Dicheirus dilatatus angulatus Casey, 1914
- Dicheirus dilatatus dilatatus (Dejean, 1829)
