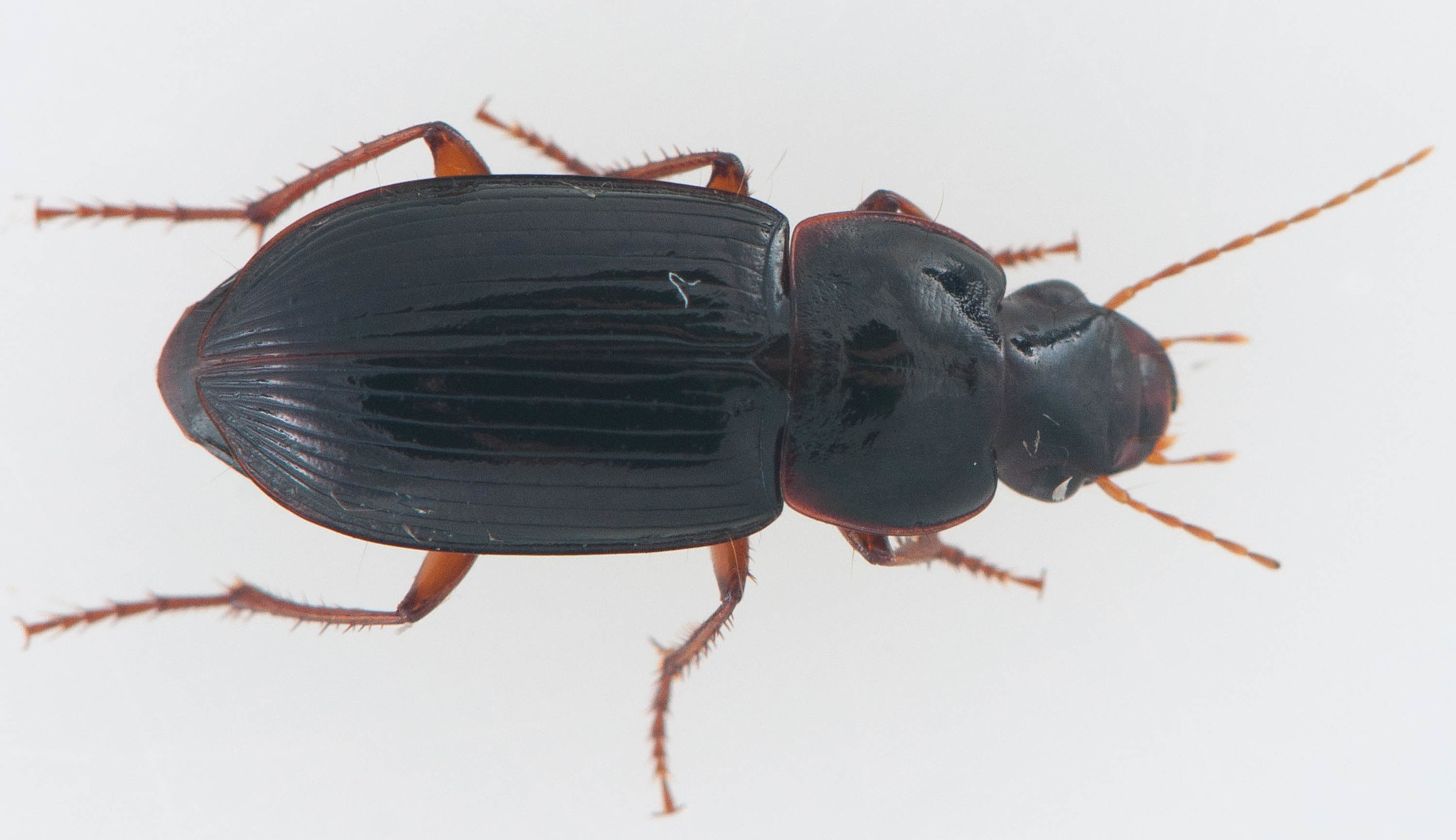

Scientific classification
- Domain: Eukaryota
- Kingdom: Animalia
- Phylum: Arthropoda
- Class: Insecta
- Order: Coleoptera
- Suborder: Adephaga
- Family: Carabidae
- Subfamily: Harpalinae
- Tribe: Harpalini
- Subtribe: Anisodactylina
- Genus: Notiobia
- Species: N. purpurascens

Binomial name
- Notiobia purpurascens (Bates, 1882)

= Notiobia purpurascens =

Species of beetle

Notiobia purpurascens is a species of ground beetle in the family Carabidae. It is found in North America.
