= Crasodactylus =

Scientific classification
- Kingdom: Animalia
- Phylum: Arthropoda
- Clade: Pancrustacea
- Class: Insecta
- Order: Coleoptera
- Suborder: Adephaga
- Family: Carabidae
- Subfamily: Harpalinae
- Tribe: Anisodactylini
- Genus: Crasodactylus; Guérin-Méneville, 1847

Species of beetle

Crasodactylus is a genus in the beetle family Carabidae. There are at least two described species in Crasodactylus.

== Species ==
These two species belong to the genus Crasodactylus:

- Crasodactylus indicus Andrewes, 1933 (Afghanistan and India)
- Crasodactylus punctatus Guérin-Méneville, 1847 (Africa and Asia)
