= Cenogmus =

Scientific classification
- Kingdom: Animalia
- Phylum: Arthropoda
- Class: Insecta
- Order: Coleoptera
- Suborder: Adephaga
- Family: Carabidae
- Subfamily: Harpalinae
- Tribe: Anisodactylini
- Genus: Cenogmus; Sloane, 1898

Genus of beetles

Cenogmus is a genus in the ground beetle family Carabidae. There are at least three described species in Cenogmus, found in Australia.

== Species ==
These three species belong to the genus Cenogmus:

- Cenogmus castelnaui Csiki, 1932
- Cenogmus interioris (Laporte, 1867)
- Cenogmus opacipennis (Chaudoir, 1878)
