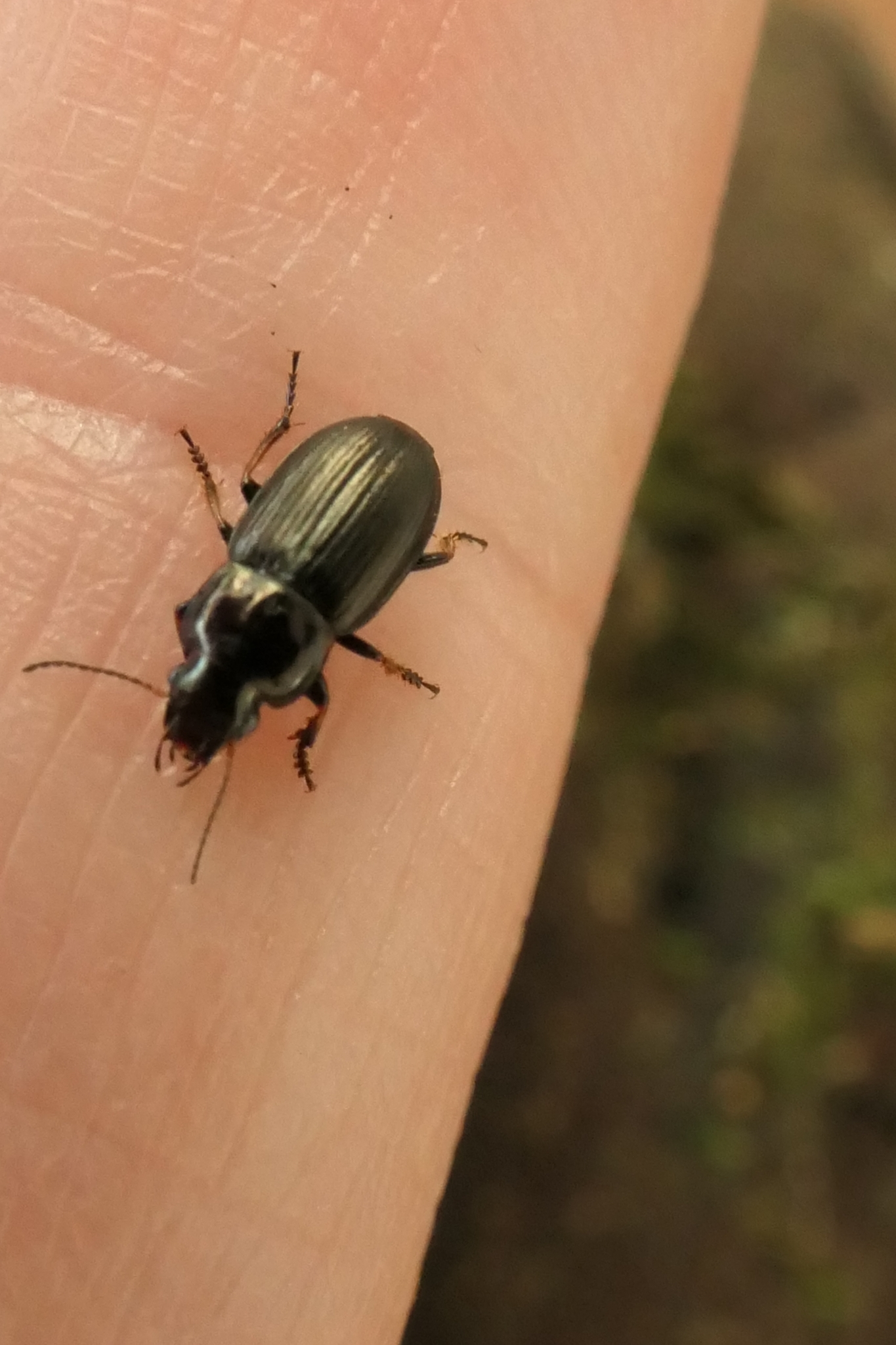
- Gnathaphanus melbournensis, New Zealand

Scientific classification
- Kingdom: Animalia
- Phylum: Arthropoda
- Class: Insecta
- Order: Coleoptera
- Suborder: Adephaga
- Family: Carabidae
- Genus: Gnathaphanus
- Species: G. melbournensis

Binomial name
- Gnathaphanus melbournensis (Laporte, 1867)

= Gnathaphanus melbournensis =

Species of beetle

Gnathaphanus melbournensis is a species of ground beetle in the family Carabidae. It is found in Australia and New Zealand.
