= Criniventer =

Scientific classification
- Domain: Eukaryota
- Kingdom: Animalia
- Phylum: Arthropoda
- Class: Insecta
- Order: Coleoptera
- Suborder: Adephaga
- Family: Carabidae
- Subfamily: Harpalinae
- Tribe: Anisodactylini
- Genus: Criniventer; Emden, 1953
- Species: C. rufus

Binomial name
- Criniventer rufus (Brullé, 1838)

Species of beetle

Criniventer is a genus in the beetle family Carabidae. This genus has a single species, Criniventer rufus. It is found in Argentina.
