= Pseudorhysopus =

Scientific classification
- Domain: Eukaryota
- Kingdom: Animalia
- Phylum: Arthropoda
- Class: Insecta
- Order: Coleoptera
- Suborder: Adephaga
- Family: Carabidae
- Subfamily: Harpalinae
- Tribe: Anisodactylini
- Genus: Pseudorhysopus; Kataev & Wrase, 2001

Genus of beetles

Pseudorhysopus is a genus in the beetle family Carabidae. There are at least two described species in Pseudorhysopus.

== Species ==
These two species belong to the genus Pseudorhysopus:

- Pseudorhysopus fukiensis (Jedlicka, 1956) (China)
- Pseudorhysopus kabakovi Kataev & Wrase, 2001 (China and Vietnam)
