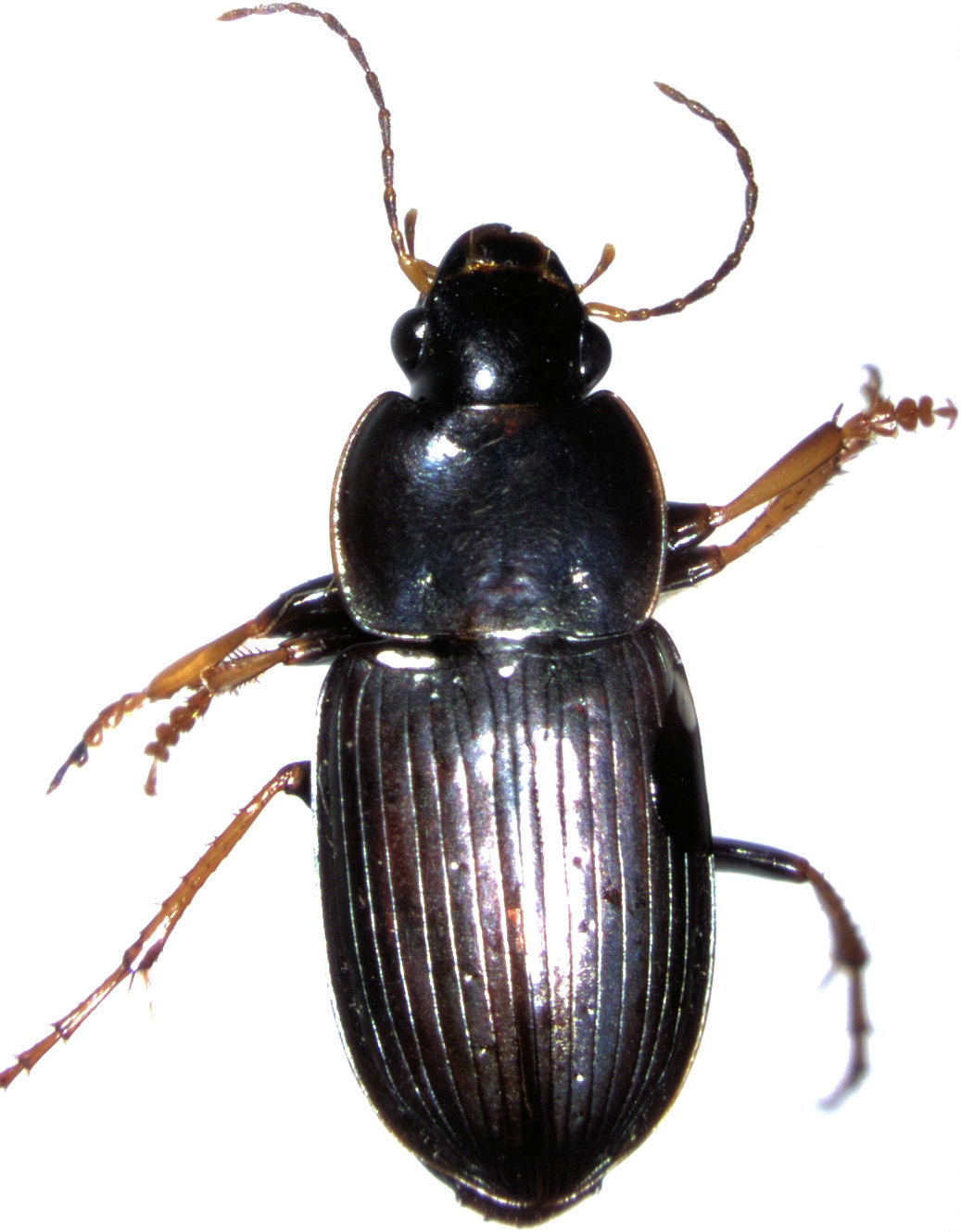
- Gnathaphanus melbournensis

Scientific classification
- Domain: Eukaryota
- Kingdom: Animalia
- Phylum: Arthropoda
- Class: Insecta
- Order: Coleoptera
- Suborder: Adephaga
- Family: Carabidae
- Subfamily: Harpalinae
- Tribe: Anisodactylini
- Genus: Gnathaphanus; W.S.MacLeay, 1825

= Gnathaphanus =

Genus of beetles

Gnathaphanus is a genus in the beetle family Carabidae. There are more than 20 described species in Gnathaphanus.

== Species ==
These 25 species belong to the genus Gnathaphanus:

- Gnathaphanus aridus Blackburn, 1892 (Australia)
- Gnathaphanus chinensis Schauberger, 1932 (China)
- Gnathaphanus chujoi Habu, 1973 (Japan)
- Gnathaphanus froggatti (W.J.MacLeay, 1888) (Australia)
- Gnathaphanus glamorgani (Lequillon, 1841)
- Gnathaphanus herbaceus Sloane, 1900 (Australia)
- Gnathaphanus kansuensis Schauberger, 1932 (China)
- Gnathaphanus latus Sloane, 1900 (Australia)
- Gnathaphanus licinoides Hope, 1842 (Oceania)
- Gnathaphanus loeffleri Jedlicka, 1966 (Laos)
- Gnathaphanus masudai (Nakane & Ishida, 1959) (Japan)
- Gnathaphanus melbournensis (Laporte, 1867) (Australia and New Zealand)
- Gnathaphanus multipunctatus (W.J.MacLeay, 1888) (Oceania)
- Gnathaphanus parallelus Louwerens, 1962 (Indonesia)
- Gnathaphanus philippensis (Chevrolat, 1841) (Indomalaya, Australia)
- Gnathaphanus picipes (W.J.MacLeay, 1864) (New Guinea and Australia)
- Gnathaphanus porcatulus (W.J.MacLeay, 1888) (Australia)
- Gnathaphanus pulcher (Dejean, 1829) (Indonesia and Australia)
- Gnathaphanus punctifer (Laporte, 1867) (Australia)
- Gnathaphanus rectangulus Chaudoir, 1878 (Australia)
- Gnathaphanus riverinae Sloane, 1895 (Australia)
- Gnathaphanus sexpunctatus (W.J.MacLeay, 1888) (Australia)
- Gnathaphanus subolivaceus (W.S.MacLeay, 1825) (Indonesia)
- Gnathaphanus vulneripennis (W.S.MacLeay, 1825) (Southeast Asia)
- Gnathaphanus whitei Sloane, 1917 (Australia)

== Parasites ==
In Australia, Gnathaphanus pulcher is parasitized by a species of mite, Eutarsopolipus pulcher Hajiqanbar & Seeman, 2021 which dwells under the elytra.
