= Notiobia peratra =

Scientific classification
- Kingdom: Animalia
- Phylum: Arthropoda
- Class: Insecta
- Order: Coleoptera
- Suborder: Adephaga
- Family: Carabidae
- Subfamily: Harpalinae
- Tribe: Harpalini
- Subtribe: Anisodactylina
- Genus: Notiobia
- Species: N. peratra

Binomial name
- Notiobia peratra (Sloane, 1920)

Species of beetle

Notiobia peratra is a species in the beetle family Carabidae. It lives in Australia.
