= Notiobia mexicana =

Scientific classification
- Kingdom: Animalia
- Phylum: Arthropoda
- Class: Insecta
- Order: Coleoptera
- Suborder: Adephaga
- Family: Carabidae
- Tribe: Harpalini
- Subtribe: Anisodactylina
- Genus: Notiobia
- Species: N. mexicana

Binomial name
- Notiobia mexicana (Dejean, 1829)

Species of beetle

Notiobia mexicana is a species of ground beetle in the family Carabidae. It is found in North America.
