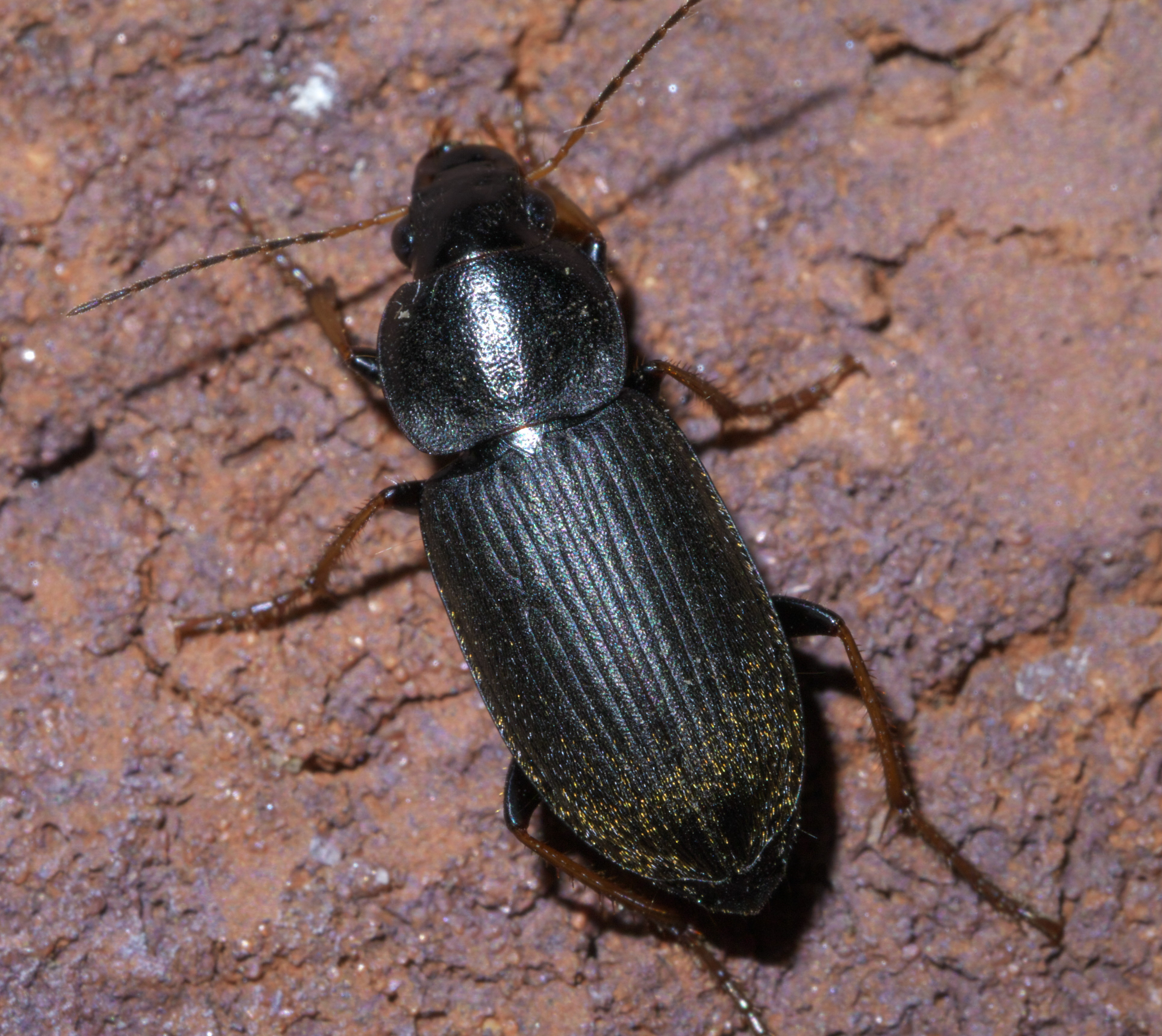

Scientific classification
- Domain: Eukaryota
- Kingdom: Animalia
- Phylum: Arthropoda
- Class: Insecta
- Order: Coleoptera
- Suborder: Adephaga
- Family: Carabidae
- Subfamily: Harpalinae
- Tribe: Harpalini
- Genus: Amphasia
- Species: A. sericea

Binomial name
- Amphasia sericea (T. Harris, 1828)

= Amphasia sericea =

Species of beetle

Amphasia sericea is a species of ground beetle in the family Carabidae. It is found in North America.

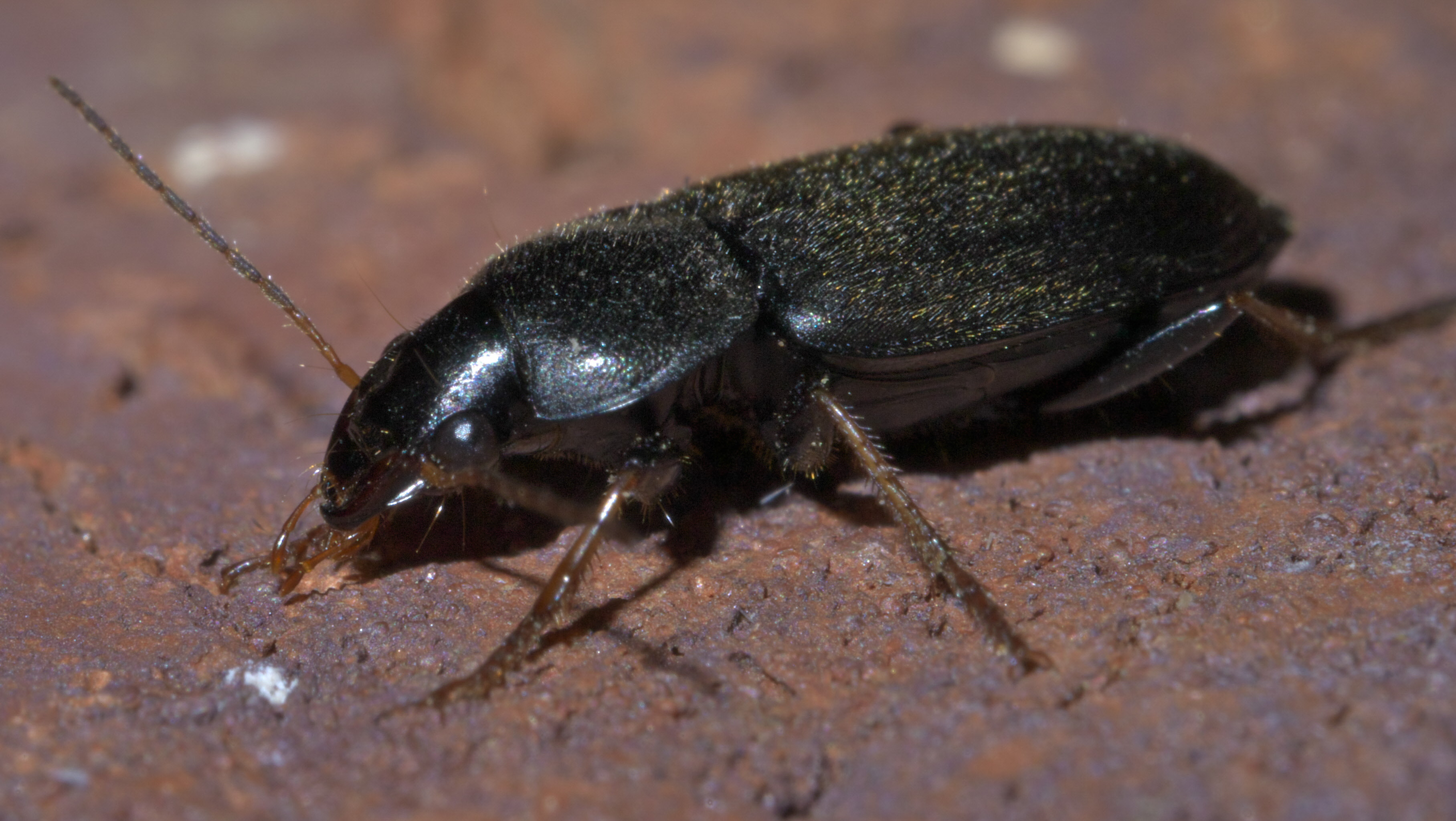
