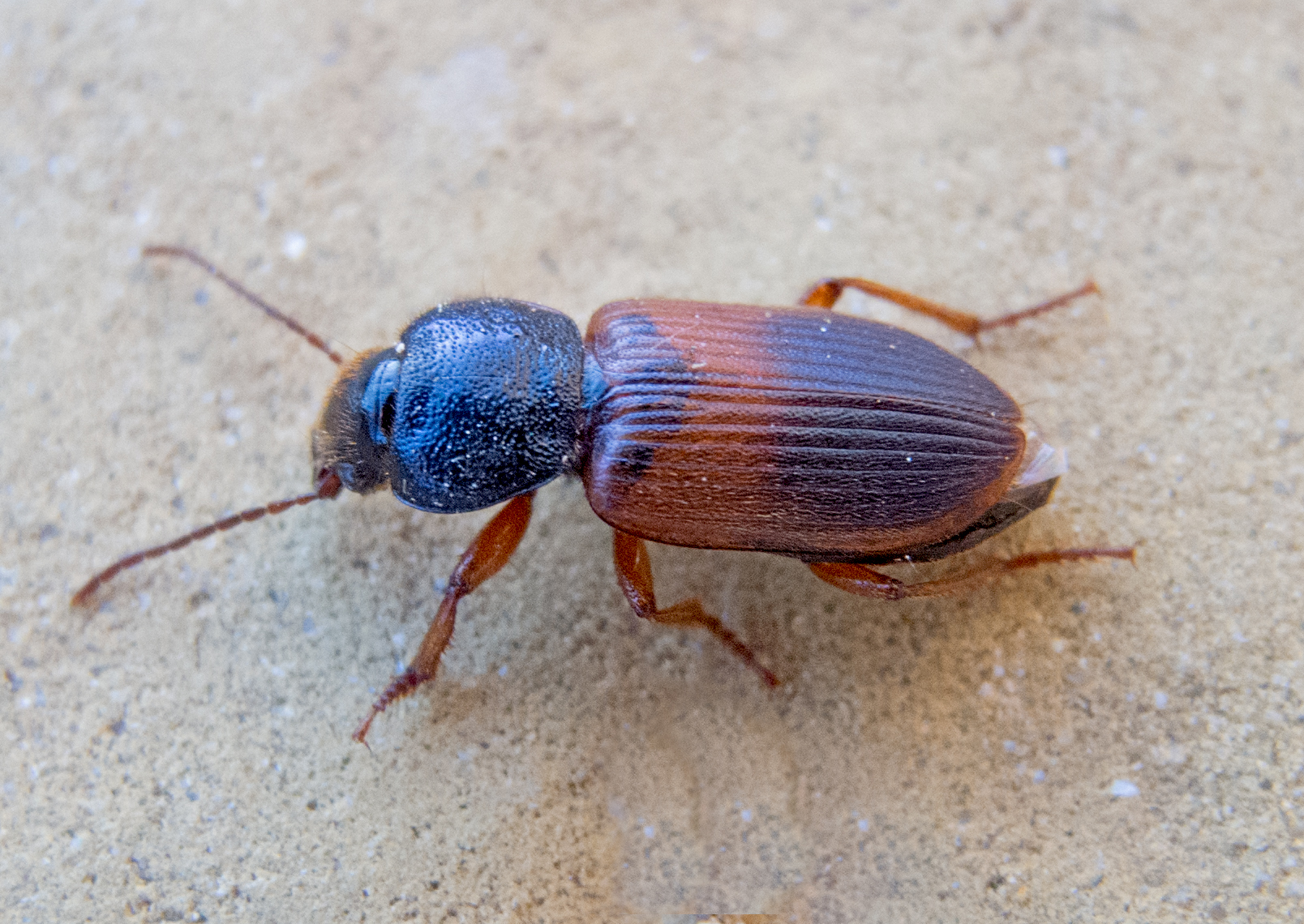
- Gynandromorphus etruscus, Bulgaria

Scientific classification
- Kingdom: Animalia
- Phylum: Arthropoda
- Class: Insecta
- Order: Coleoptera
- Suborder: Adephaga
- Family: Carabidae
- Subfamily: Harpalinae
- Tribe: Anisodactylini
- Genus: Gynandromorphus; Dejean, 1829

= Gynandromorphus =

Genus of beetles

Gynandromorphus is a genus in the beetle family Carabidae. There are at least two described species in Gynandromorphus, native to the Palearctic (including Europe) and the Near East.

== Species ==
These two species belong to the genus Gynandromorphus:

- Gynandromorphus etruscus (Quensel, 1806)
- Gynandromorphus peyroni Carret, 1905
