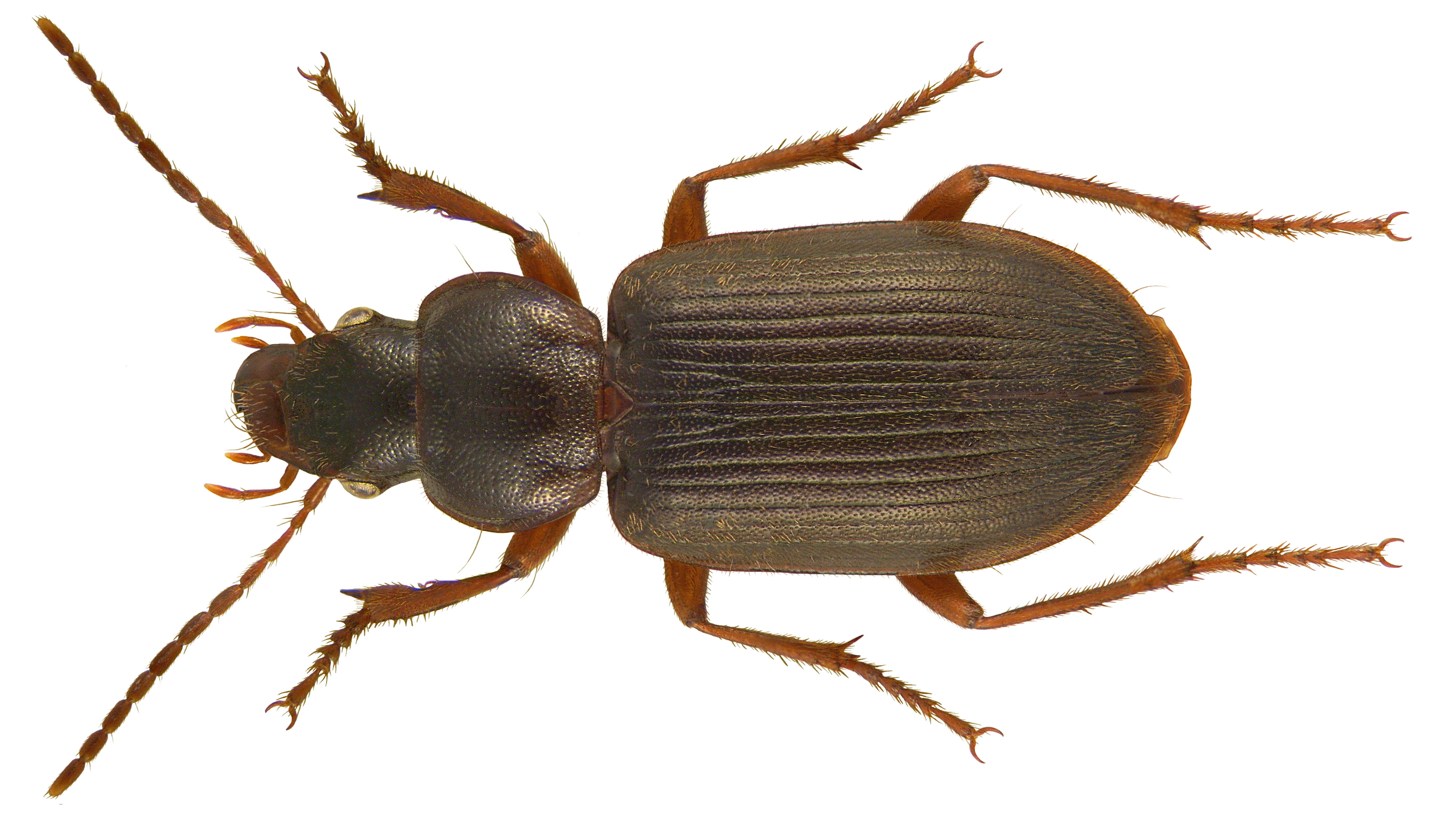
- Scybalicus oblongiusculus

Scientific classification
- Domain: Eukaryota
- Kingdom: Animalia
- Phylum: Arthropoda
- Class: Insecta
- Order: Coleoptera
- Suborder: Adephaga
- Family: Carabidae
- Subfamily: Harpalinae
- Tribe: Anisodactylini
- Genus: Scybalicus; Schaum, 1862

= Scybalicus =

Genus of beetles

Scybalicus is a genus in the beetle family Carabidae. There are at least three described species in Scybalicus.

== Species ==
These three species belong to the genus Scybalicus:

- Scybalicus kabylianus (Reiche, 1862) (Algeria and Tunisia)
- Scybalicus minoricensis J. & E.Vives, 1994 (Spain and Baleares)
- Scybalicus oblongiusculus (Dejean, 1829) (Palearctic)
