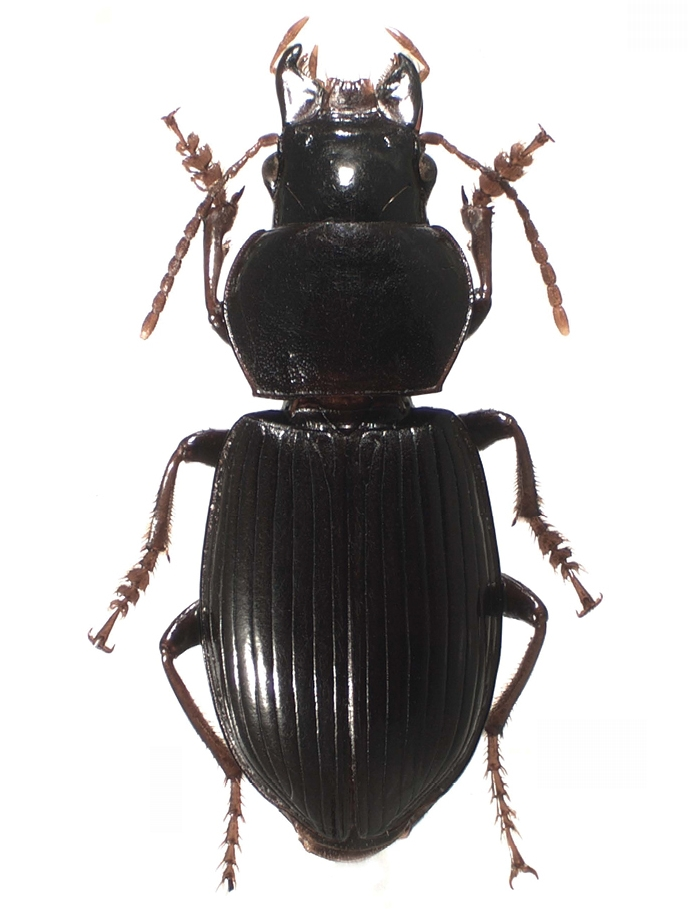
- Chydaeus asetosus

Scientific classification
- Kingdom: Animalia
- Phylum: Arthropoda
- Class: Insecta
- Order: Coleoptera
- Suborder: Adephaga
- Family: Carabidae
- Subfamily: Harpalinae
- Tribe: Anisodactylini
- Genus: Chydaeus; Chaudoir, 1854

Subgenera
- Chydaeus Chaudoir, 1854; Javanochydaeus N.Ito, 1997

= Chydaeus =

Genus of beetles

Chydaeus is a genus of beetles in the family Carabidae. Members of this genus are distributed mainly over mountainous regions of southeastern Asia, from the Himalayas and China to the Sunda Islands; however, three species are known from New Guinea and one from Australia.

== Species ==
The genus contains the following species:

- Chydaeus abramovi Kataev & Fedorenko, 2013 – Vietnam
- Chydaeus acutangulus Kataev & Schmidt, 2006 – Nepal
  - Chydaeus acutangulus acutangulus
  - Chydaeus acutangulus shiva Kataev & Schmidt, 2006
- Chydaeus andrewesi Schauberger, 1932
  - Chydaeus andrewesi andrewesi
  - Chydaeus andrewesi szetschuanus Schauberger, 1932 – southeastern China
- Chydaeus asetosus Kataev & Kavanaugh, 2012 – Yunnan, China
- Chydaeus bakeri Andrewes, 1926
- Chydaeus baoshanensis Kataev & Liang, 2012 – Yunnan, China
- Chydaeus bedeli (Tschitscherine, 1897)
  - Chydaeus bedeli bedeli
  - Chydaeus bedeli difficilis Kataev & Schmidt, 2001
  - Chydaeus bedeli interjectus Kataev & Schmidt, 2001
  - Chydaeus bedeli longipennis Kataev & Schmidt, 2001
  - Chydaeus bedeli vietnamensis Kataev & Schmidt, 2001 – Vietnam
- Chydaeus belousovi Kataev, Wrase & Schmidt, 2014 – Yunnan, China
- Chydaeus bhutanensis Kataev & J.Schmidt, 2001
- Chydaeus chujoi Habu, 1975
- Chydaeus chuliensis Kataev, Wrase & Schmidt, 2014 – Nepal
- Chydaeus constrictus (Bates, 1883)
- Chydaeus convexiusculus Kataev & Schmidt, 2006
- Chydaeus convexus Ito, 2002
- Chydaeus dalatensis Kataev & Fedorenko, 2013 – Vietnam
- Chydaeus darlingtoni Baehr, 2007
- Chydaeus dissimilis Kataev, Wrase & Schmidt, 2014 – Taiwan
- Chydaeus doiinthanonensis Ito, 1992
- Chydaeus eremita Kataev & Schmidt, 2006
- Chydaeus fugongensis Kataev & Kavanaugh, 2012 – Yunnan, China
- Chydaeus ganeshensis Kataev, Wrase & Schmidt, 2014 – Nepal
- Chydaeus gestroi Andrewes, 1929
- Chydaeus gutangensis Kataev & Liang, 2012 – Tibet, China
- Chydaeus hanmiensis Kataev & Liang, 2012 – Tibet, China
- Chydaeus harpaloides Kataev & Schmidt, 2006
- Chydaeus hinnus Darlington, 1971
- Chydaeus irvinei (Andrewes, 1930)
- Chydaeus javanicus Schauberger, 1934 – Java, Indonesia
- Chydaeus jedlickai Schauberger, 1932
- Chydaeus kabaki Kataev, Wrase & Schmidt, 2014 – Sichuan, China
- Chydaeus kasaharai Ito, 2002
- Chydaeus kirishimanus Habu, 1973 – Japan
- Chydaeus kumei Ito, 1992
- Chydaeus luxiensis Kataev, Wrase & Schmidt, 2014 – Yunnan, China
- Chydaeus majusculus Kataev & Fedorenko, 2013 – Vietnam
- Chydaeus malaisei Kataev & Schmidt, 2006
- Chydaeus manasluensis Kataev & Schmidt, 2001
- Chydaeus minimus Kataev & Schmidt, 2001
- Chydaeus miwai Jedlicka, 1946
- Chydaeus nepalensis Kataev & Schmidt, 2006
  - Chydaeus nepalensis nepalensis – Nepal
  - Chydaeus nepalensis punctulatus Kataev & Schmidt, 2006
  - Chydaeus nepalensis schawalleri Kataev & Schmidt, 2006
- Chydaeus obscurus Chaudoir, 1854
- Chydaeus obtusicollis Schauberger, 1932
- Chydaeus ovalipennis Kataev & Schmidt, 2001
- Chydaeus papua Darlington, 1968
- Chydaeus putaoensis Kataev, Wrase & Schmidt, 2014 – Myanmar
- Chydaeus queenslandicus Baehr, 2004 – Queensland, Australia
- Chydaeus rufipes Jedlicka, 1940
- Chydaeus salvazae Schauberger, 1934
- Chydaeus satoi Ito, 2003
- Chydaeus schaubergeri Jedlicka, 1931
- Chydaeus semenowi (Tschitscherine, 1899)
- Chydaeus shaanxiensis Kataev, Wrase & Schmidt, 2014 – Shaanxi, China
- Chydaeus shibatai Habu, 1973 – Japan
- Chydaeus shikokuensis Habu, 1973
- Chydaeus shunichii Ito, 2006
- Chydaeus similis Kataev & Schmidt, 2001
- Chydaeus soluensis Kataev & J.Schmidt, 2019 - Nepal
- Chydaeus uenoi Habu, 1975
- Chydaeus weishanensis Kataev, Wrase & Schmidt, 2014 – Yunnan, China
- Chydaeus wuliangensis Kataev, Wrase & Schmidt, 2014 – Yunnan, China
- Chydaeus yunnanus Jedlicka, 1941
