= Anisostichus =

Scientific classification
- Domain: Eukaryota
- Kingdom: Animalia
- Phylum: Arthropoda
- Class: Insecta
- Order: Coleoptera
- Suborder: Adephaga
- Family: Carabidae
- Subfamily: Harpalinae
- Tribe: Anisodactylini
- Genus: Anisostichus; Emden, 1953

Genus of beetles

Anisostichus is a genus in the beetle family Carabidae. There are at least four described species in Anisostichus, found in South America.

== Species ==
These four species belong to the genus Anisostichus:

- Anisostichus laevis (Curtis, 1839) (Bolivia, Chile, and Argentina)
- Anisostichus octopunctatus (Dejean, 1829) (Argentina)
- Anisostichus posticus (Dejean, 1829) (Argentina)
- Anisostichus solieri (Csiki, 1932) (Chile and Argentina)
