= Notiobia germari =

Scientific classification
- Domain: Eukaryota
- Kingdom: Animalia
- Phylum: Arthropoda
- Class: Insecta
- Order: Coleoptera
- Suborder: Adephaga
- Family: Carabidae
- Subfamily: Harpalinae
- Tribe: Harpalini
- Subtribe: Anisodactylina
- Genus: Notiobia
- Species: N. germari

Binomial name
- Notiobia germari (Laporte, 1867)

Synonyms
- Harpalus subphaedrus

Species of beetle

Notiobia germari is a species in the beetle family Carabidae. It is found in Australia.
