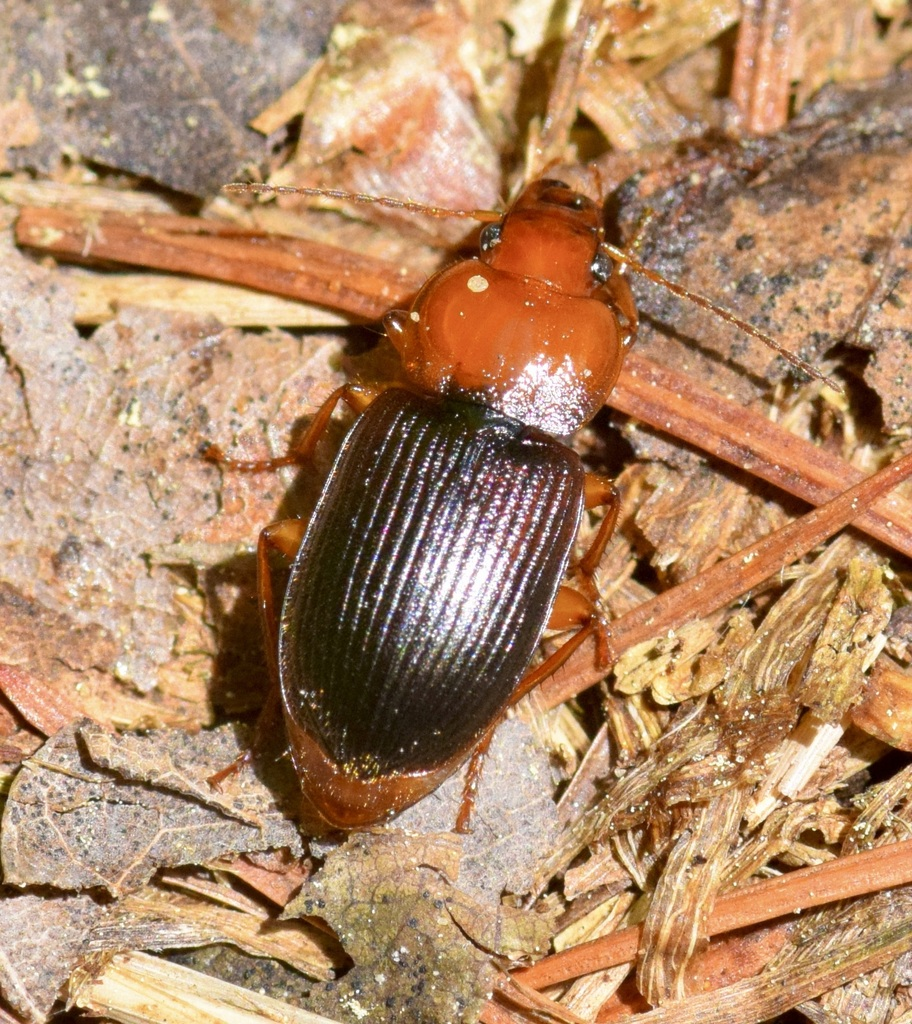

Scientific classification
- Domain: Eukaryota
- Kingdom: Animalia
- Phylum: Arthropoda
- Class: Insecta
- Order: Coleoptera
- Suborder: Adephaga
- Family: Carabidae
- Subfamily: Harpalinae
- Tribe: Harpalini
- Genus: Amphasia
- Species: A. interstitialis

Binomial name
- Amphasia interstitialis (Say, 1823)

Synonyms
- Feronia interstitialis (Say, 1823)

= Amphasia interstitialis =

Species of beetle

Amphasia interstitialis, the red-headed ground beetle, is a species of ground beetle in the family Carabidae. It is native to North America.

== Description ==
Its size ranges from 8.5 to 10.2 mm (0.33 to 0.40 inches). It has dark elytra with an orange pronotum and head. Its antennae have 11 segments and are lighter orange. The legs are pale orange as well. The underside of its abdomen is dark with the rear end of the abdomen (and the rest of the underside) being orange.

== Distribution ==
Amphasia interstitialis is widespread across the northeastern United States, slightly branching out into Ontario, Quebec, and the central United States.

It is found in covered places such as deciduous forests, usually in leaf litter and under stones and logs. It is also found in lowland habitats such as wetlands and mesic areas.
