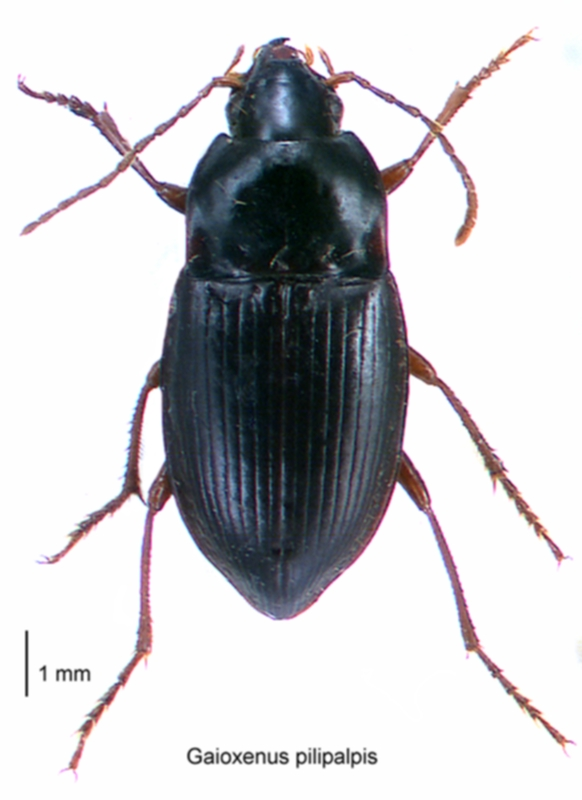

Scientific classification
- Kingdom: Animalia
- Phylum: Arthropoda
- Class: Insecta
- Order: Coleoptera
- Suborder: Adephaga
- Family: Carabidae
- Subfamily: Harpalinae
- Tribe: Anisodactylini
- Genus: Gaioxenus; Broun, 1910
- Species: G. pilipalpis

Binomial name
- Gaioxenus pilipalpis Broun, 1910

= Gaioxenus =

Gaioxenus pilipalpis

Genus of beetles

Gaioxenus is a genus of beetles in the family Carabidae. Gaioxenus pilipalpis is the only species in the genus. This genus and species was first described by Thomas Broun in 1910. Broun based the descriptions on specimens he collected in Raurimu in the Manawatū-Whanganui region of New Zealand. Gaioxenus pilipalpis is endemic to New Zealand.
