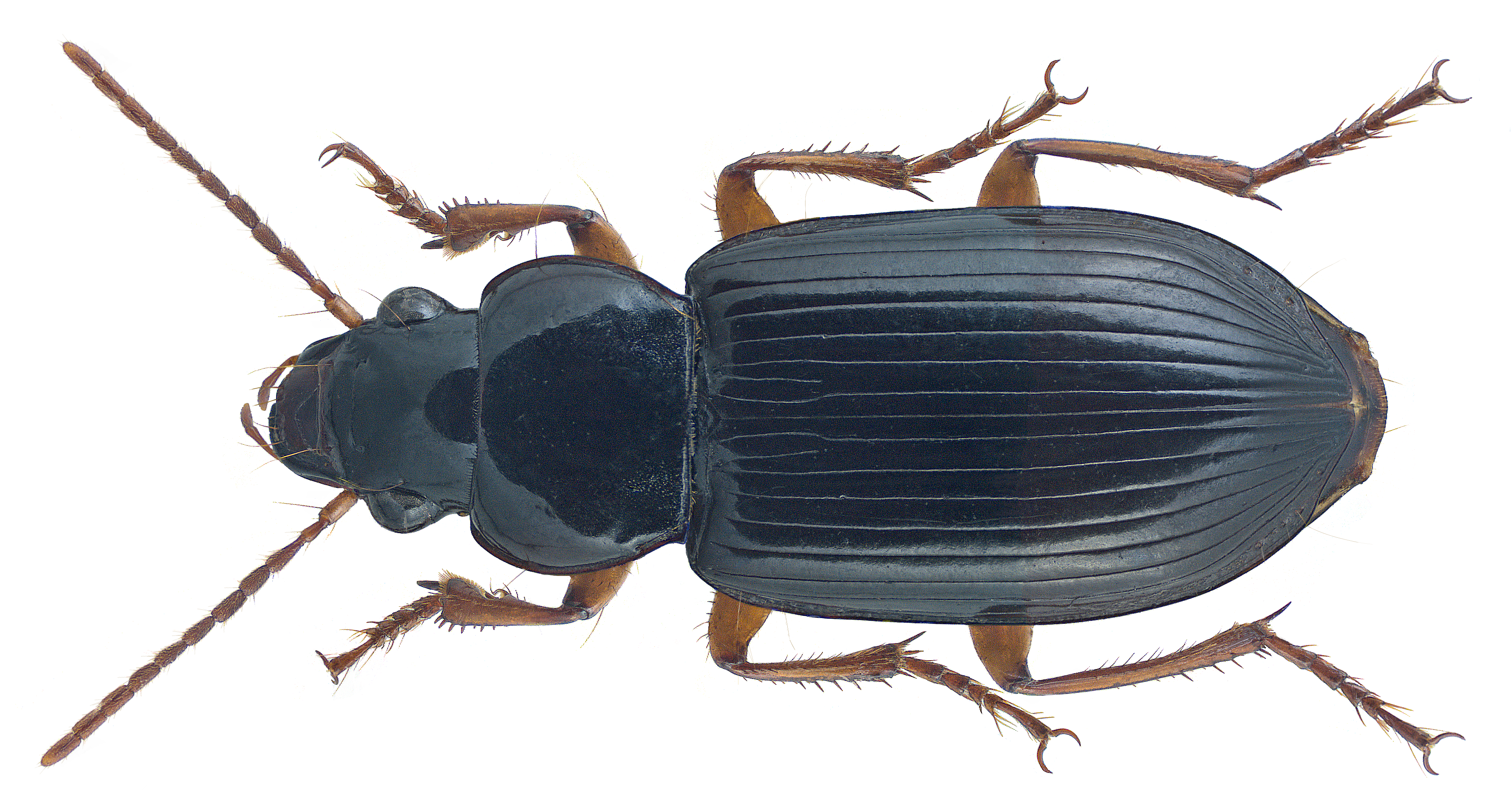
- Progonochaetus ochropus

Scientific classification
- Domain: Eukaryota
- Kingdom: Animalia
- Phylum: Arthropoda
- Class: Insecta
- Order: Coleoptera
- Suborder: Adephaga
- Family: Carabidae
- Subfamily: Harpalinae
- Tribe: Anisodactylini
- Genus: Progonochaetus; G.Müller, 1938

Subgenera
- Eudichirus Jeannel, 1946; Progonochaetus G.Müller, 1938

= Progonochaetus =

Genus of beetles

Progonochaetus is a genus in the beetle family Carabidae. There are more than 50 described species in Progonochaetus, found mostly in Africa, but also in Asia, Madagascar, and the island of Reunion.

== Species ==
These 51 species belong to the genus Progonochaetus:

- Progonochaetus aeruginosus (Dejean, 1829)
- Progonochaetus angolanus (Basilewsky, 1946)
- Progonochaetus approximatus (Kolbe, 1897)
- Progonochaetus arnoldi (Basilewsky, 1948)
- Progonochaetus atrofuscus (Fairmaire, 1869)
- Progonochaetus atroviridis (Fairmaire, 1869)
- Progonochaetus bamboutensis (Basilewsky, 1948)
- Progonochaetus basilewskyi Noonan, 1973
- Progonochaetus bicoloripes (Burgeon, 1936)
- Progonochaetus brittoni (Basilewsky, 1946)
- Progonochaetus caffer (Boheman, 1848)
- Progonochaetus chevalieri (Basilewsky, 1946)
- Progonochaetus cookei (Basilewsky, 1953)
- Progonochaetus cursorius (Dejean, 1831)
- Progonochaetus decorsei (Basilewsky, 1948)
- Progonochaetus dilatatus (Klug, 1853)
- Progonochaetus discrepans (Basilewsky, 1946)
- Progonochaetus eburneus (Basilewsky, 1950)
- Progonochaetus gabonicus (Basilewsky, 1946)
- Progonochaetus inchoatus (Péringuey, 1908)
- Progonochaetus incrassatus (Boheman, 1848)
- Progonochaetus indicus Kataev, 2002
- Progonochaetus jeanneli (Basilewsky, 1946)
- Progonochaetus jocquei Facchini, 2005
- Progonochaetus kafakumbae (Basilewsky, 1949)
- Progonochaetus kapangae (Burgeon, 1936)
- Progonochaetus laeticolor (Chaudoir, 1876)
- Progonochaetus laevistriatus (Sturm, 1818)
- Progonochaetus limbatus (Quedenfeldt, 1883)
- Progonochaetus merus (Basilewsky, 1949)
- Progonochaetus moestus (Chaudoir, 1878)
- Progonochaetus nigricrus (Dejean, 1829)
- Progonochaetus obscuripes (LaFerté-Sénectère, 1853)
- Progonochaetus obtusus (Basilewsky, 1946)
- Progonochaetus ochropus (Dejean, 1829)
- Progonochaetus piceus (Dejean, 1829)
- Progonochaetus planicollis (Putzeys, 1880)
- Progonochaetus prolixus (Basilewsky, 1948)
- Progonochaetus pseudochropus (Kuntzen, 1919)
- Progonochaetus punctibasis Facchini, 2003
- Progonochaetus rudebecki (Basilewsky, 1946)
- Progonochaetus sakalava (Jeannel, 1948)
- Progonochaetus sciakyi Facchini, 2003
- Progonochaetus seyrigi (Jeannel, 1948)
- Progonochaetus similis Facchini, 2016
- Progonochaetus straneoi (Basilewsky, 1949)
- Progonochaetus subcupreus (Chaudoir, 1876)
- Progonochaetus unicolor Facchini, 2016
- Progonochaetus vagans (Dejean, 1831)
- Progonochaetus voltae (Basilewsky, 1948)
- Progonochaetus xanthopus (Dejean, 1829)
