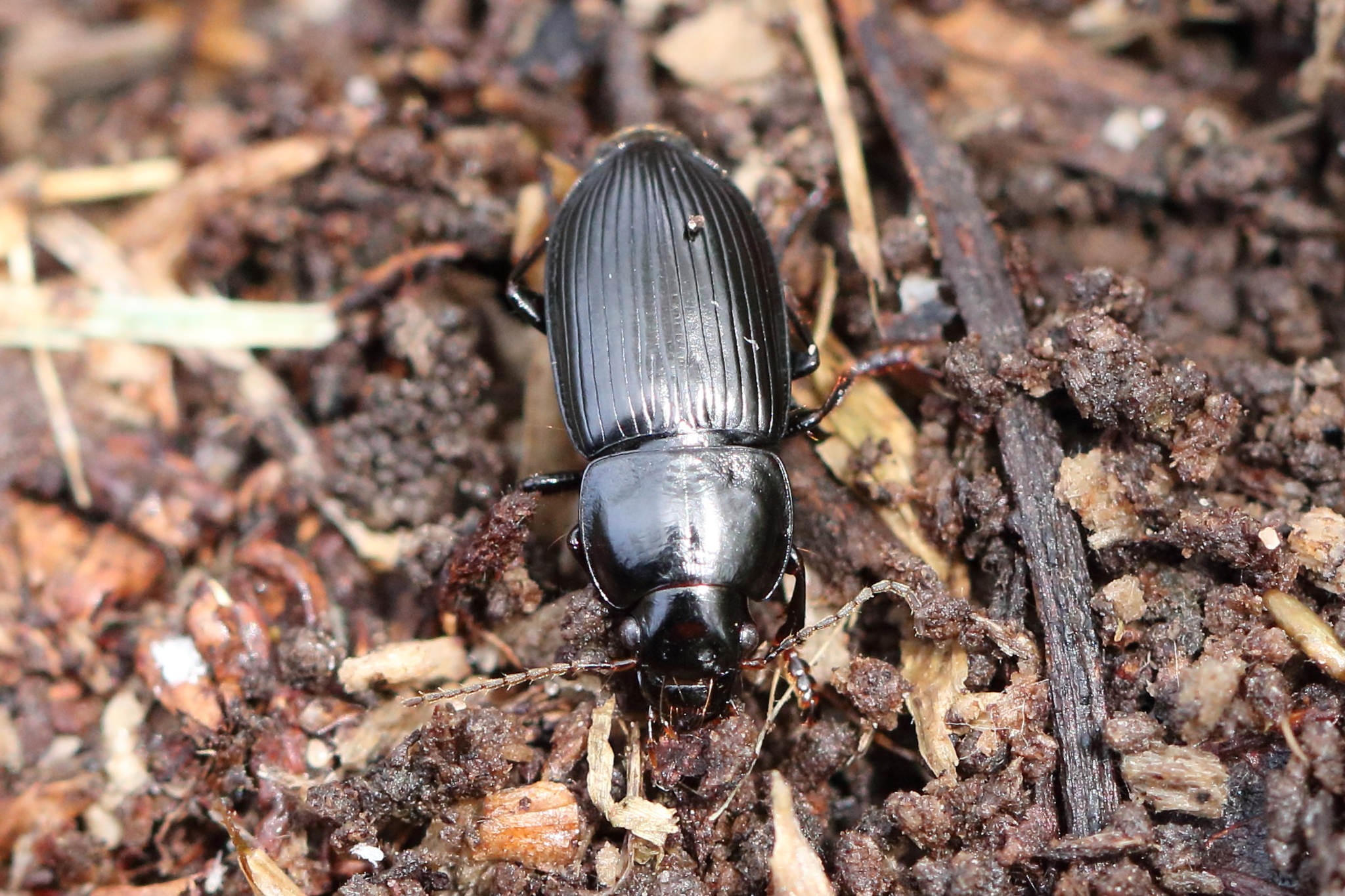
- Xestonotus lugubris, New York

Scientific classification
- Kingdom: Animalia
- Phylum: Arthropoda
- Class: Insecta
- Order: Coleoptera
- Suborder: Adephaga
- Family: Carabidae
- Tribe: Anisodactylini
- Genus: Xestonotus; LeConte, 1853
- Species: X. lugubris

Binomial name
- Xestonotus lugubris (Dejean, 1829)

= Xestonotus =

Species of beetle

Xestonotus is a genus of ground beetles in the family Carabidae. This genus has a single species, Xestonotus lugubris, found in the northeasterm United States and southeastern Canada.
