= Notiobia overlaeti =

Scientific classification
- Kingdom: Animalia
- Phylum: Arthropoda
- Clade: Pancrustacea
- Class: Insecta
- Order: Coleoptera
- Suborder: Adephaga
- Family: Carabidae
- Genus: Notiobia
- Species: N. overlaeti

Binomial name
- Notiobia overlaeti (Burgeon, 1936)

Synonyms
- Anisodactylus overlaeti Burgeon, 1936; Phanagnathus overlaeti (Burgeon, 1936)

Species of beetle

Notiobia overlaeti is a species of beetle in the family Carabidae. It is known from the Democratic Republic of the Congo.
