= Dicheirus piceus =

Scientific classification
- Domain: Eukaryota
- Kingdom: Animalia
- Phylum: Arthropoda
- Class: Insecta
- Order: Coleoptera
- Suborder: Adephaga
- Family: Carabidae
- Subfamily: Harpalinae
- Tribe: Harpalini
- Genus: Dicheirus
- Species: D. piceus

Binomial name
- Dicheirus piceus (Ménétriés, 1843)

Species of beetle

Dicheirus piceus is a species of ground beetle in the family Carabidae. It is found in North America and the Caribbean.
