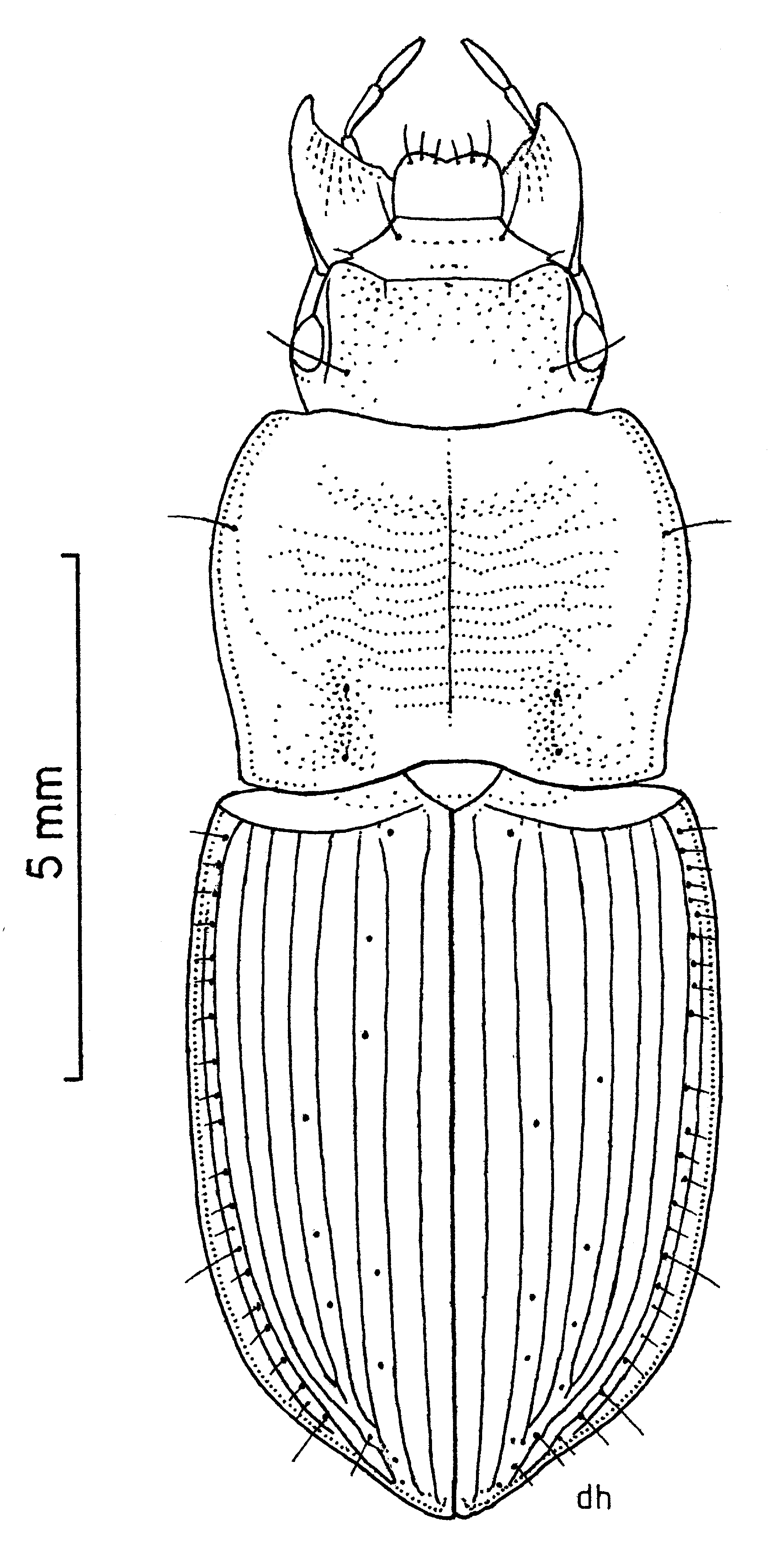
- Coleoptera: Carabidae) Tuiharpalus gourlayi illustrated

Conservation status
- Naturally Uncommon (NZ TCS)

Scientific classification
- Kingdom: Animalia
- Phylum: Arthropoda
- Class: Insecta
- Order: Coleoptera
- Suborder: Adephaga
- Family: Carabidae
- Tribe: Harpalini
- Subtribe: Anisodactylina
- Genus: Tuiharpalus
- Species: T. gourlayi

Binomial name
- Tuiharpalus gourlayi (Britton, 1964)

= Tuiharpalus gourlayi =

Species of beetle

Tuiharpalus gourlayi is a species of ground beetle in the family Carabidae. It is found in New Zealand.
