= Harpalomimetes =

Scientific classification
- Domain: Eukaryota
- Kingdom: Animalia
- Phylum: Arthropoda
- Class: Insecta
- Order: Coleoptera
- Suborder: Adephaga
- Family: Carabidae
- Subfamily: Harpalinae
- Tribe: Anisodactylini
- Genus: Harpalomimetes; Schauberger, 1932

Genus of beetles

Harpalomimetes is a genus of carabids in the beetle family Carabidae. There are about five described species in Harpalomimetes, found in East and Southeast Asia.

== Species ==
These five species belong to the genus Harpalomimetes:

- Harpalomimetes andrewesi Schauberger, 1933 (Vietnam)
- Harpalomimetes fukiensis (Jedlicka, 1957) (China, Japan)
- Harpalomimetes papua N.Ito, 1995 (New Guinea)
- Harpalomimetes shibatai (Habu, 1969) (Japan)
- Harpalomimetes sjoestedti (Andrewes, 1926) (Indonesia, Borneo, Philippines)
