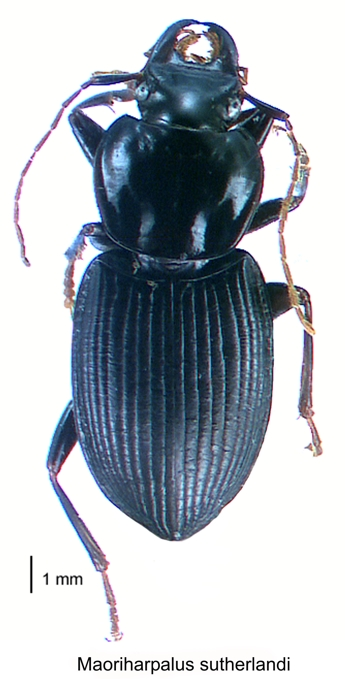

Scientific classification
- Domain: Eukaryota
- Kingdom: Animalia
- Phylum: Arthropoda
- Class: Insecta
- Order: Coleoptera
- Suborder: Adephaga
- Family: Carabidae
- Subfamily: Harpalinae
- Tribe: Anisodactylini
- Genus: Maoriharpalus; Larochelle & Larivière, 2005
- Species: M. sutherlandi

Binomial name
- Maoriharpalus sutherlandi Larochelle & Larivière, 2005

= Maoriharpalus =

Species of beetle

Maoriharpalus is a genus in the ground beetle family Carabidae. This genus has a single species, Maoriharpalus sutherlandi. It is found in New Zealand.
