= Pseudanisotarsus =

Scientific classification
- Domain: Eukaryota
- Kingdom: Animalia
- Phylum: Arthropoda
- Class: Insecta
- Order: Coleoptera
- Suborder: Adephaga
- Family: Carabidae
- Subfamily: Harpalinae
- Tribe: Anisodactylini
- Genus: Pseudanisotarsus; Noonan, 1973
- Species: P. nicki

Binomial name
- Pseudanisotarsus nicki (Emden, 1953)

Species of beetle

Pseudanisotarsus is a genus of ground beetles in the family Carabidae. This genus has a single species, Pseudanisotarsus nicki, found in Argentina.
