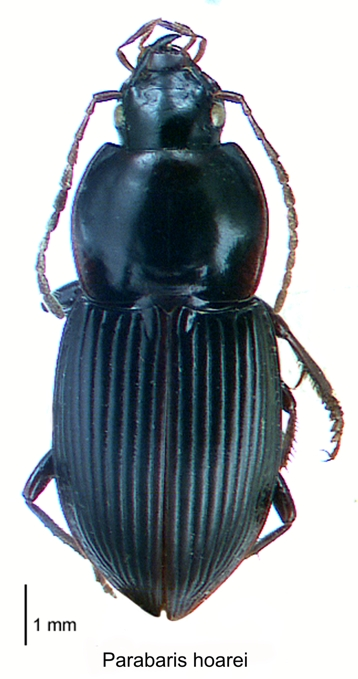
- Parabaris hoarei

Scientific classification
- Kingdom: Animalia
- Phylum: Arthropoda
- Class: Insecta
- Order: Coleoptera
- Suborder: Adephaga
- Family: Carabidae
- Subfamily: Harpalinae
- Tribe: Anisodactylini
- Genus: Parabaris; Broun, 1881

= Parabaris =

Genus of beetles

Parabaris is a genus in the ground beetle family Carabidae. There are at least three described species in Parabaris, found in New Zealand.

== Species ==
These three species belong to the genus Parabaris:

- Parabaris atratus Broun, 1881
- Parabaris hoarei Larochelle & Larivière, 2005
- Parabaris lesagei Larochelle & Larivière, 2005
