= Notiobia nitidipennis =

Scientific classification
- Kingdom: Animalia
- Phylum: Arthropoda
- Class: Insecta
- Order: Coleoptera
- Suborder: Adephaga
- Family: Carabidae
- Genus: Notiobia
- Species: N. nitidipennis

Binomial name
- Notiobia nitidipennis (LeConte, 1847)

Species of beetle

Notiobia nitidipennis is a species of ground beetle in the family Carabidae. It lives in North America.
