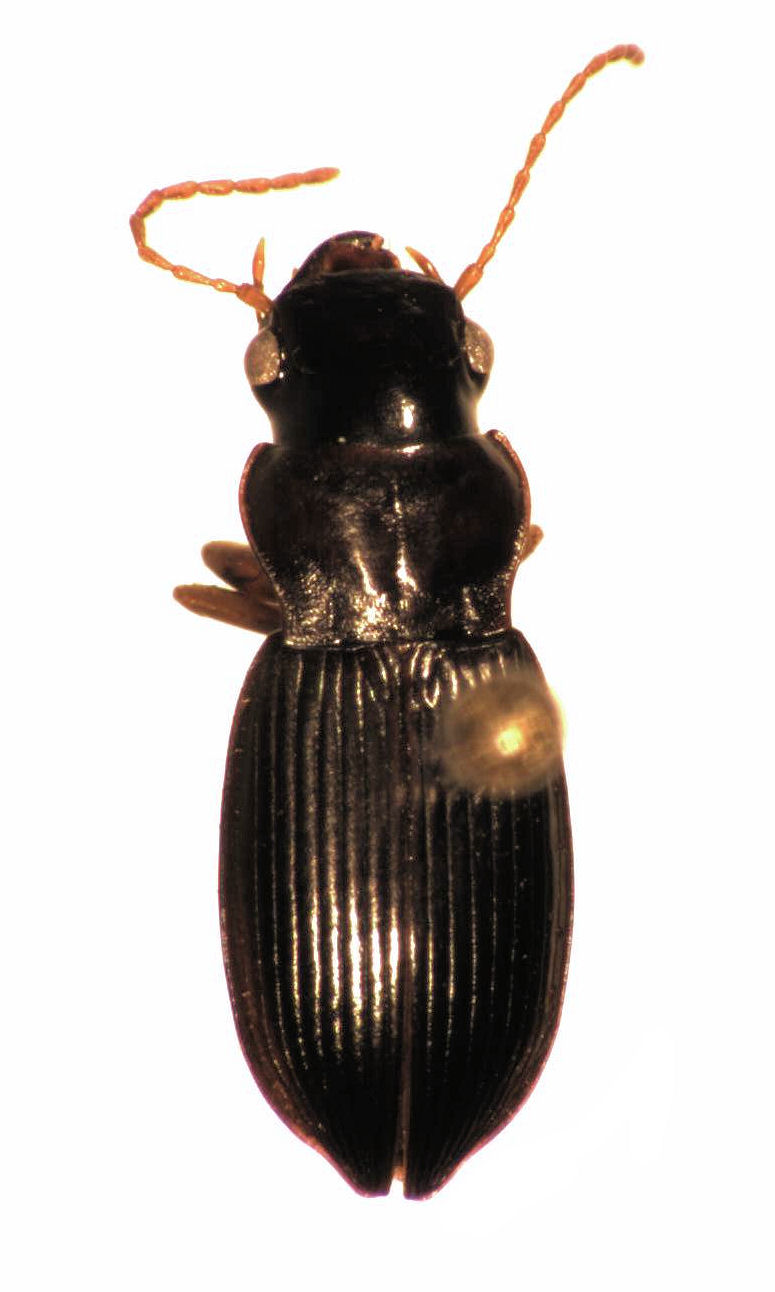
- Allocinopus sculpticollis

Scientific classification
- Kingdom: Animalia
- Phylum: Arthropoda
- Class: Insecta
- Order: Coleoptera
- Suborder: Adephaga
- Family: Carabidae
- Subfamily: Harpalinae
- Genus: Allocinopus; Broun, 1903

= Allocinopus =

Genus of beetles

Allocinopus is a genus of beetles in the family Carabidae, containing the following species:

- Allocinopus angustulus Broun, 1912
- Allocinopus belli Larochelle & Lariviere, 2005
- Allocinopus bousqueti Larochelle & Lariviere, 2005
- Allocinopus latitarsis Broun, 1911
- Allocinopus scuplticollis Broun, 1903
- Allocinopus smithi Broun, 1912
- Allocinopus wardi Larochelle & Lariviere, 2005
