= Nornalupia =

Scientific classification
- Domain: Eukaryota
- Kingdom: Animalia
- Phylum: Arthropoda
- Class: Insecta
- Order: Coleoptera
- Suborder: Adephaga
- Family: Carabidae
- Subfamily: Harpalinae
- Tribe: Anisodactylini
- Genus: Nornalupia; Kataev, 2002

Species of beetle

Nornalupia is a genus in the beetle family Carabidae. There are at least two described species in Nornalupia, found in Australia.

== Species ==
These two species belong to the genus Nornalupia:

- Nornalupia impuncta Kataev, 2007 (Australia)
- Nornalupia megacephala Kataev, 2002 (Australia)
