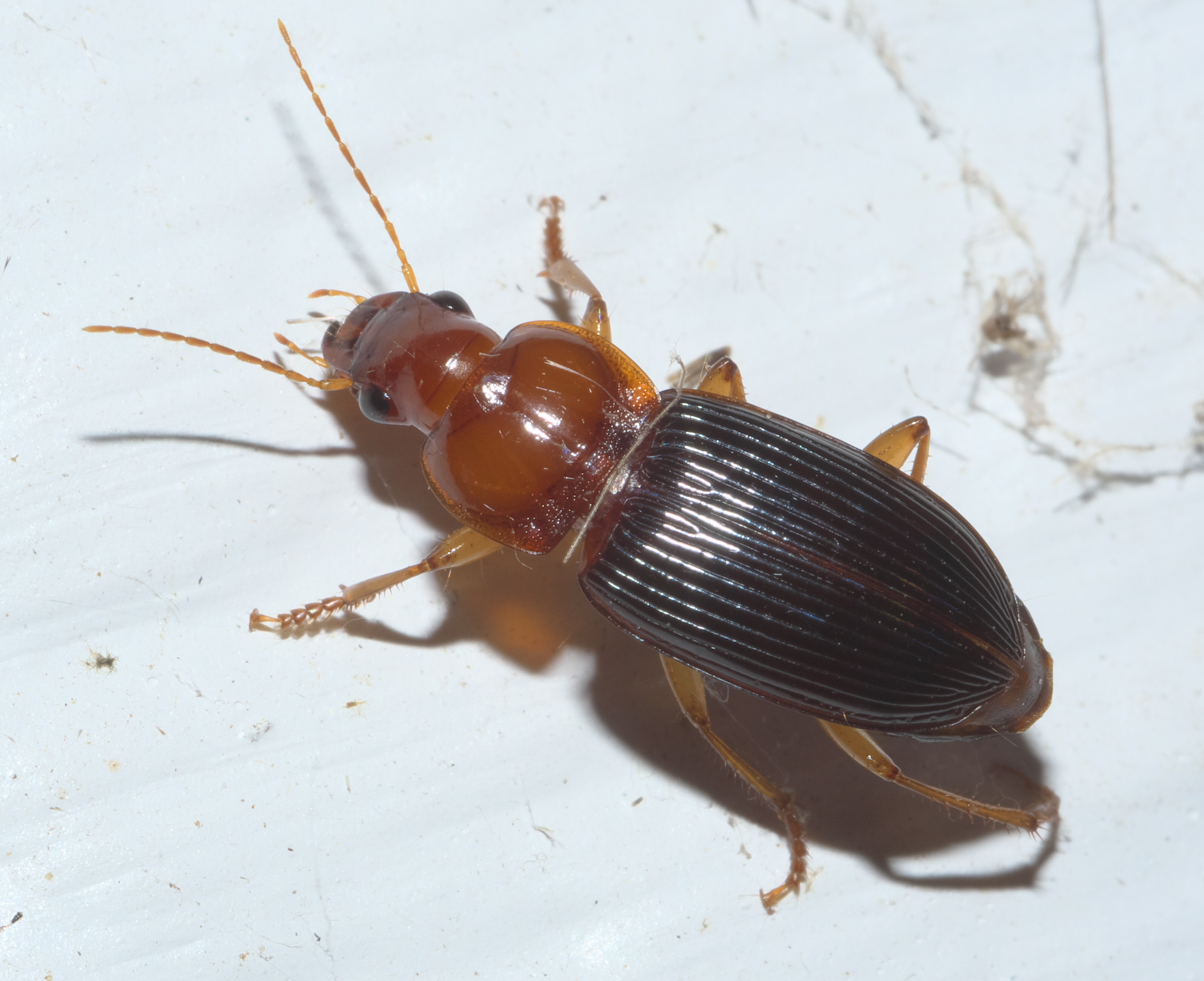
- Notiobia terminata

Scientific classification
- Domain: Eukaryota
- Kingdom: Animalia
- Phylum: Arthropoda
- Class: Insecta
- Order: Coleoptera
- Suborder: Adephaga
- Family: Carabidae
- Subfamily: Harpalinae
- Tribe: Harpalini
- Subtribe: Anisodactylina
- Genus: Notiobia; Perty, 1830

Subgenera
- Anisotarsus Chaudoir, 1837; Diatypus Murray, 1858; Notiobia Perty, 1830

= Notiobia =

Genus of beetles

Notiobia is a genus of ground beetles in the family Carabidae, comprising at least 100 species.

== Species ==
These 100 species belong to the genus Notiobia:

- Notiobia acuminata Arndt & Wrase, 2001
- Notiobia aeneola Putzeys, 1878
- Notiobia aethiopica Facchini, 2015
- Notiobia aguilarorum Noonan, 1981
- Notiobia angustula (Chaudoir, 1878)
- Notiobia aulica (Dejean, 1829)
- Notiobia bamboutensis (Basilewsky, 1949)
- Notiobia bradytoides (Bates, 1891)
- Notiobia brevicollis (Chaudoir, 1837)
- Notiobia cephala (Casey, 1914)
- Notiobia chalcea (Brullé, 1838)
- Notiobia chalcitis (Germar, 1823)
- Notiobia chiriquensis Bates, 1884
- Notiobia concinna (Erichson, 1847)
- Notiobia concolor Putzeys, 1878
- Notiobia cooperi Noonan, 1973
- Notiobia cupreola Bates, 1878
- Notiobia cupripennis (Germar, 1823)
- Notiobia curlettii Facchini, 2003
- Notiobia cyanippa (Bates, 1882)
- Notiobia dampierii (Laporte, 1867)
- Notiobia demeyeri Facchini, 2015
- Notiobia denisonensis (Laporte, 1867)
- Notiobia diffusa (Klug, 1833)
- Notiobia disparilis Bates, 1878
- Notiobia dohrnii (Murray, 1858)
- Notiobia dubia Putzeys, 1878
- Notiobia edwardsii (Laporte, 1867)
- Notiobia elgonensis (Basilewsky, 1948)
- Notiobia ewarti Noonan, 1973
- Notiobia feana (Basilewsky, 1949)
- Notiobia flavicincta (Erichson, 1847)
- Notiobia flavipalpis (W.J.MacLeay, 1864)
- Notiobia flebilis (LeConte, 1863)
- Notiobia germari (Laporte, 1867)
- Notiobia glabrata Arndt, 1998
- Notiobia hilariola (Bates, 1891)
- Notiobia inaequalipennis (Laporte, 1867)
- Notiobia incerta Bates, 1882
- Notiobia iridipennis (Chaudoir, 1843)
- Notiobia jucunda Putzeys, 1878
- Notiobia kinolae (Basilewsky, 1976)
- Notiobia kivuensis (Burgeon, 1936)
- Notiobia lamprota (Bates, 1882)
- Notiobia lapeyrousei (Laporte, 1867)
- Notiobia laticollis (W.J.MacLeay, 1888)
- Notiobia latiuscula (Emden, 1953)
- Notiobia leiroides Bates, 1878
- Notiobia leonensis (Basilewsky, 1949)
- Notiobia longipennis Putzeys, 1878
- Notiobia lucidicollis (Dejean, 1829)
- Notiobia maculicornis (Chaudoir, 1843)
- Notiobia maxima Arndt, 1998
- Notiobia melaena Bates, 1882
- Notiobia melanaria (Dejean, 1829)
- Notiobia mexicana (Dejean, 1829)
- Notiobia moffetti Noonan, 1981
- Notiobia nebrioides Perty, 1830
- Notiobia nigrans (W.J.MacLeay, 1888)
- Notiobia nitidipennis (LeConte, 1847)
- Notiobia oblongula Lorenz, 1998
- Notiobia obscura Bates, 1882
- Notiobia ovata (Chaudoir, 1878)
- Notiobia overlaeti (Burgeon, 1936)
- Notiobia pallipes Bates, 1882
- Notiobia papuella (Darlington, 1968)
- Notiobia papuensis (W.J.MacLeay, 1876)
- Notiobia patrueloides (Laporte, 1867)
- Notiobia peratra (Sloane, 1920)
- Notiobia peruviana (Dejean, 1829)
- Notiobia picina (Chaudoir, 1878)
- Notiobia planiuscula (Chaudoir, 1878)
- Notiobia planoimpressa (Laporte, 1867)
- Notiobia polita (W.J.MacLeay, 1888)
- Notiobia praeclara Putzeys, 1878
- Notiobia pseudolimbipennis Arndt, 1998
- Notiobia pujoli (Basilewsky, 1968)
- Notiobia purpurascens (Bates, 1882)
- Notiobia quadricollis (Chaudoir, 1878)
- Notiobia rectangula (Chaudoir, 1878)
- Notiobia ruficruris (Brullé, 1838)
- Notiobia rugosipennis (Laporte, 1867)
- Notiobia ruwenzorica (Burgeon, 1936)
- Notiobia sanctithomae (A.Serrano, 1995)
- Notiobia sayi (Blatchley, 1910)
- Notiobia schlingeri Noonan, 1973
- Notiobia schnusei (Emden, 1953)
- Notiobia sculptipennis (Laporte, 1867)
- Notiobia sericipennis (W.J.MacLeay, 1888)
- Notiobia similis Putzeys, 1878
- Notiobia smithii (Murray, 1858)
- Notiobia tagliaferrii Facchini, 2003
- Notiobia terminata (Say, 1823)
- Notiobia tucumana (Dejean, 1831)
- Notiobia uluguruana (Basilewsky, 1962)
- Notiobia variabilis Arndt & Wrase, 2001
- Notiobia virescens (Dejean, 1831)
- Notiobia viridipennis (Sloane, 1920)
- Notiobia viridula (Dejean, 1829)
- Notiobia wilkensii (Chaudoir, 1837)
