= Rhysopus =

Rhysopus klynstrai

Scientific classification
- Kingdom: Animalia
- Phylum: Arthropoda
- Class: Insecta
- Order: Coleoptera
- Suborder: Adephaga
- Family: Carabidae
- Subfamily: Harpalinae
- Genus: Rhysopus; Andrewes, 1929
- Species: R. klynstrai

Binomial name
- Rhysopus klynstrai Andrewes, 1929

Species of beetle

Rhysopus klynstrai is a species of beetle in the family Carabidae, the only species in the genus Rhysopus.
