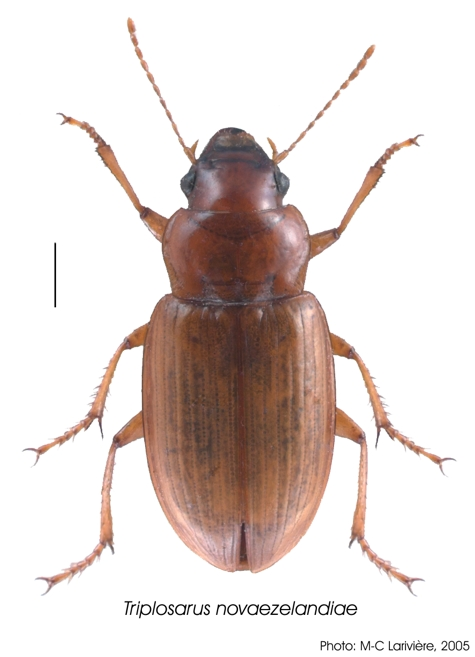

Scientific classification
- Kingdom: Animalia
- Phylum: Arthropoda
- Class: Insecta
- Order: Coleoptera
- Suborder: Adephaga
- Family: Carabidae
- Subfamily: Harpalinae
- Genus: Triplosarus; Bates, 1874
- Species: T. novaezelandiae

Binomial name
- Triplosarus novaezelandiae (Laporte de Castelnau, 1867)

= Triplosarus =

Triplosarus novaezelandiae

Species of beetle

Triplosarus novaezelandiae is a species of beetles in the family Carabidae, the only species in the genus Triplosarus. It is endemic to New Zealand.
