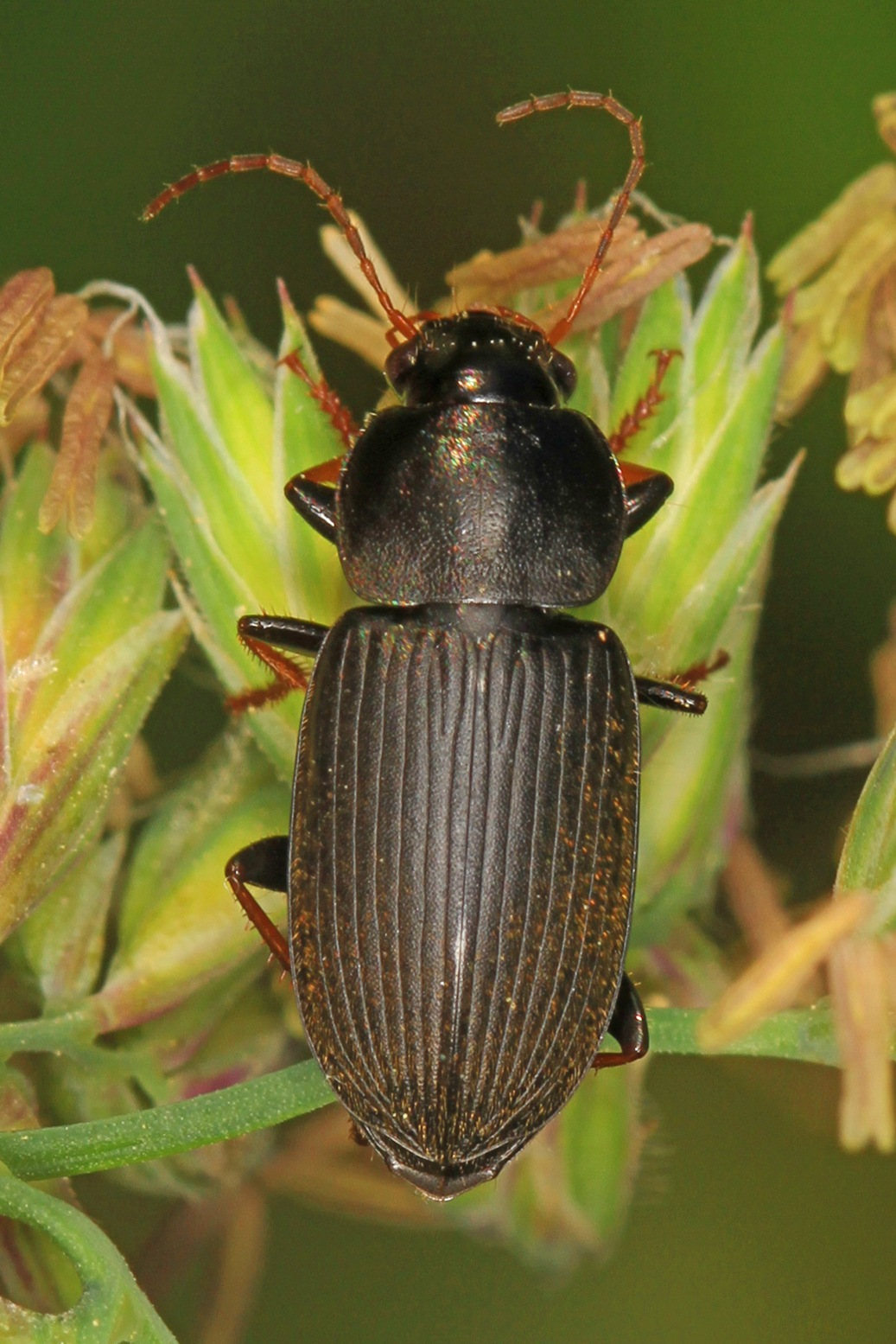
- Amphasia sericea

Scientific classification
- Kingdom: Animalia
- Phylum: Arthropoda
- Class: Insecta
- Order: Coleoptera
- Suborder: Adephaga
- Family: Carabidae
- Tribe: Harpalini
- Subtribe: Anisodactylina
- Genus: Amphasia; Newman, 1836

= Amphasia =

Genus of beetles

Amphasia is a genus of beetles in the family Carabidae, containing the following species:

- Amphasia interstitialis (Say, 1823)
- Amphasia sericea (T.W. Harris, 1828)
