= Dicheirus =

Scientific classification
- Kingdom: Animalia
- Phylum: Arthropoda
- Clade: Pancrustacea
- Class: Insecta
- Order: Coleoptera
- Suborder: Adephaga
- Family: Carabidae
- Subtribe: Anisodactylina
- Genus: Dicheirus; Mannerheim, 1843

Genus of beetles

Dicheirus is a genus of beetles in the family Carabidae, containing the following species:

- Dicheirus dilatatus Dejean, 1829
- Dicheirus obtusus LeConte, 1852
- Dicheirus piceus Menetries, 1845
- Dicheirus pilosus G. Horn, 1880
- Dicheirus strenuus G. Horn, 1868
