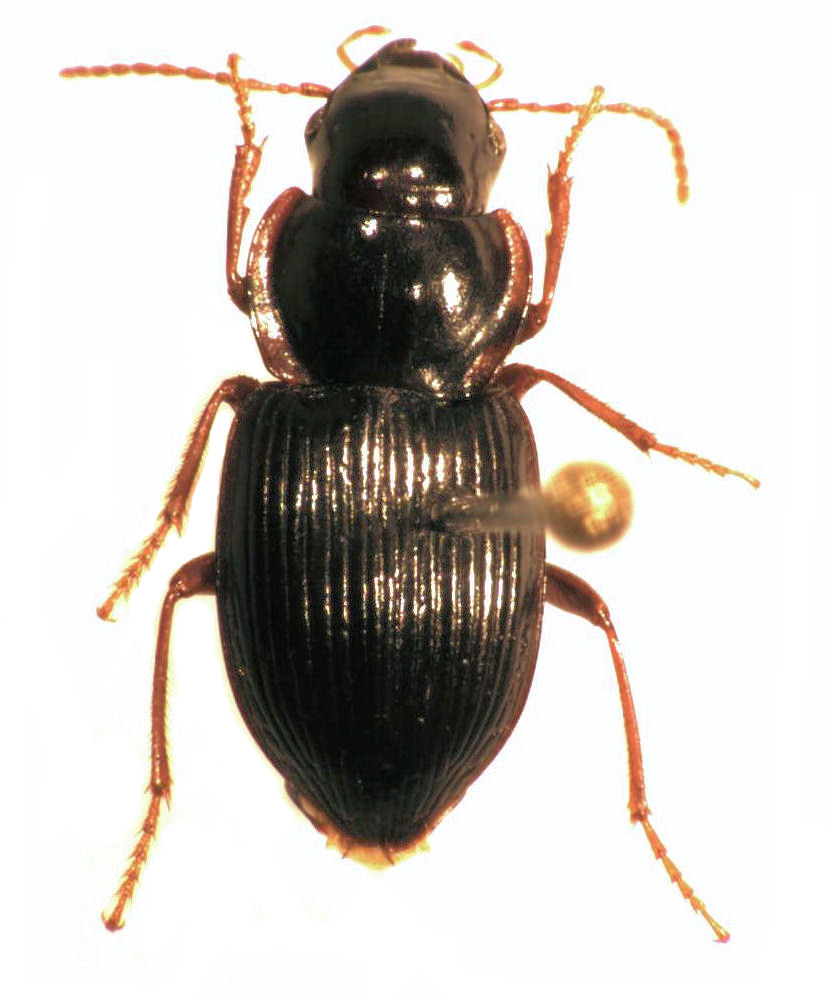
- Tuiharpalus moorei – type species of the genus

Scientific classification
- Domain: Eukaryota
- Kingdom: Animalia
- Phylum: Arthropoda
- Class: Insecta
- Order: Coleoptera
- Suborder: Adephaga
- Family: Carabidae
- Subfamily: Harpalinae
- Tribe: Harpalini
- Subtribe: Anisodactylina
- Genus: Tuiharpalus; Larochelle & Larivière, 2005

= Tuiharpalus =

Genus of beetles

Tuiharpalus is a genus of beetle in the family Carabidae. It is endemic to New Zealand, where it occurs only in Northland and on the Three Kings Islands.

== Species ==
- Tuiharpalus clunieae Larochelle & Larivière, 2005
- Tuiharpalus crosbyi Larochelle & Larivière, 2005
- Tuiharpalus gourlayi (Britton, 1964)
- Tuiharpalus hallae Larochelle & Larivière, 2005
- Tuiharpalus moorei Larochelle & Larivière, 2005

== Gallery ==
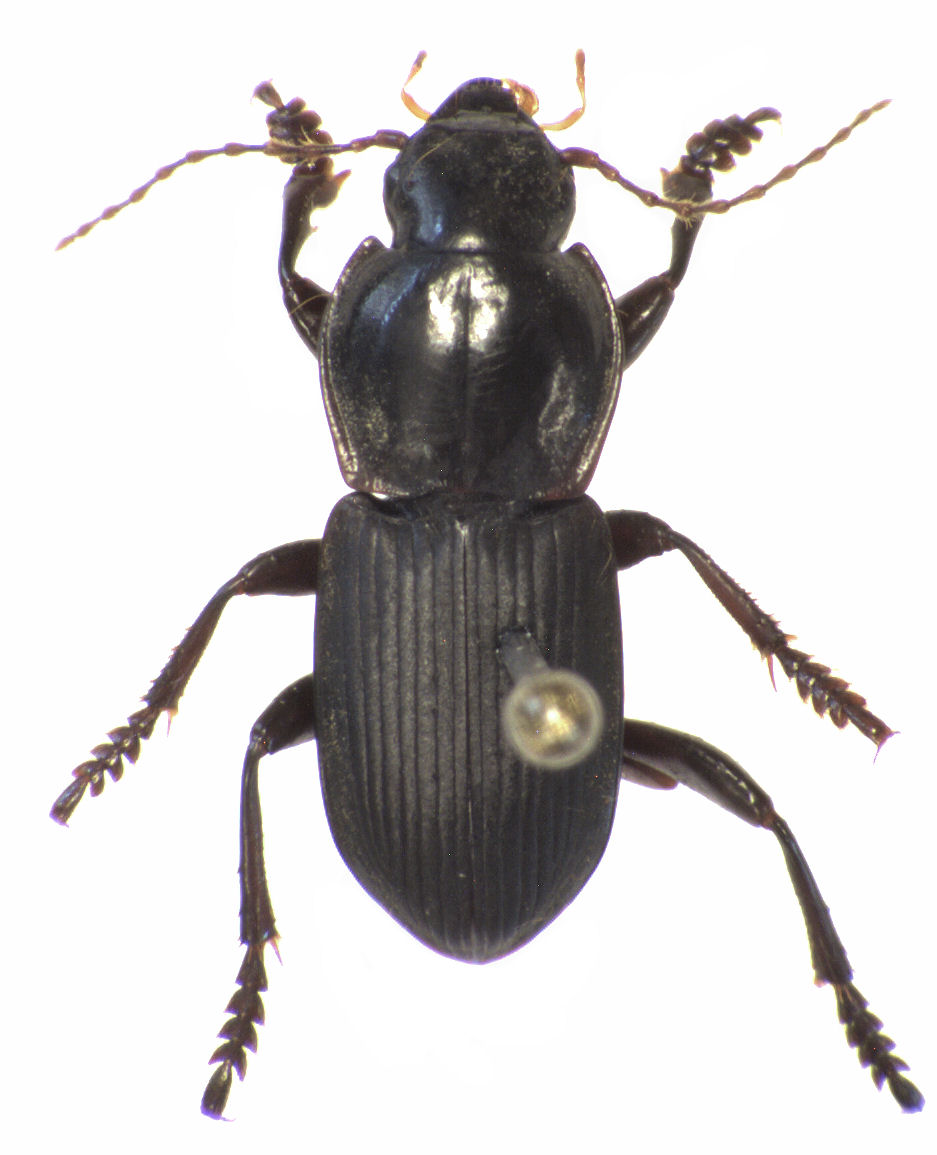
Tuiharpalus hallae (male)
