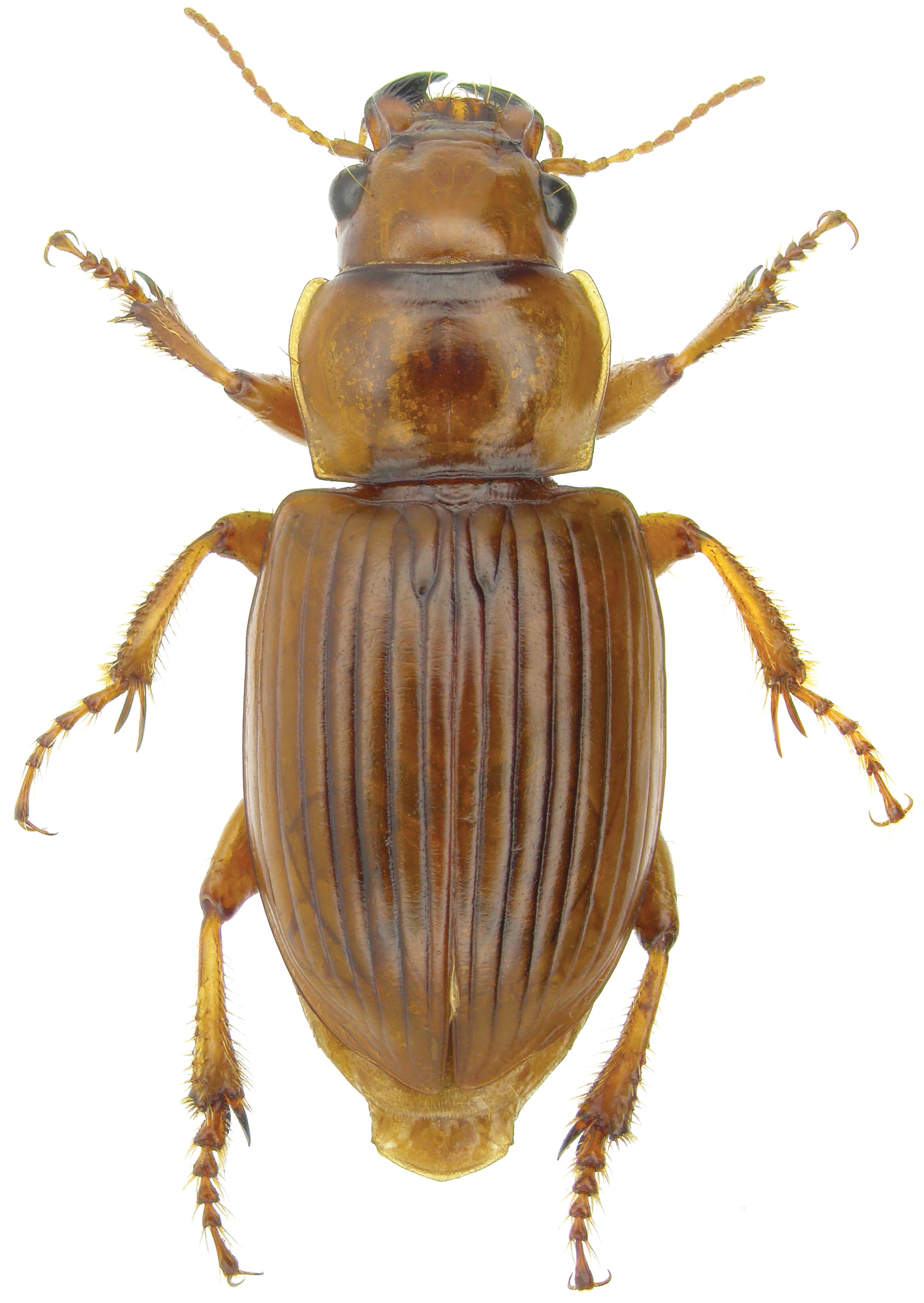

Scientific classification
- Kingdom: Animalia
- Phylum: Arthropoda
- Class: Insecta
- Order: Coleoptera
- Suborder: Adephaga
- Family: Carabidae
- Tribe: Harpalini
- Subtribe: Anisodactylina
- Genus: Geopinus; LeConte, 1847
- Species: G. incrassatus

Binomial name
- Geopinus incrassatus (Dejean, 1829)

= Geopinus =

Species of beetle

Geopinus incrassatus is a species of beetle in the family Carabidae, the only species in the genus Geopinus.

== Feeding habits ==
They are sometimes considered a minor pest when they eat the seedlings in seed beds in agricultural systems, especially wheat, cabbage, corn, flax and oats.

== Conservation ==
The species is listed as a special concern in Connecticut.
