= Allendia =

Allendia chilensis

Scientific classification
- Kingdom: Animalia
- Phylum: Arthropoda
- Clade: Pancrustacea
- Class: Insecta
- Order: Coleoptera
- Suborder: Adephaga
- Family: Carabidae
- Subfamily: Harpalinae
- Genus: Allendia; Noonan, 1974
- Species: A. chilensis

Binomial name
- Allendia chilensis (Dejean, 1829)

Genus of beetles

Allendia chilensis is a species of beetle in the family Carabidae, the only species in the genus Allendia.

It is named in honor of former Chilean President Salvador Allende.
