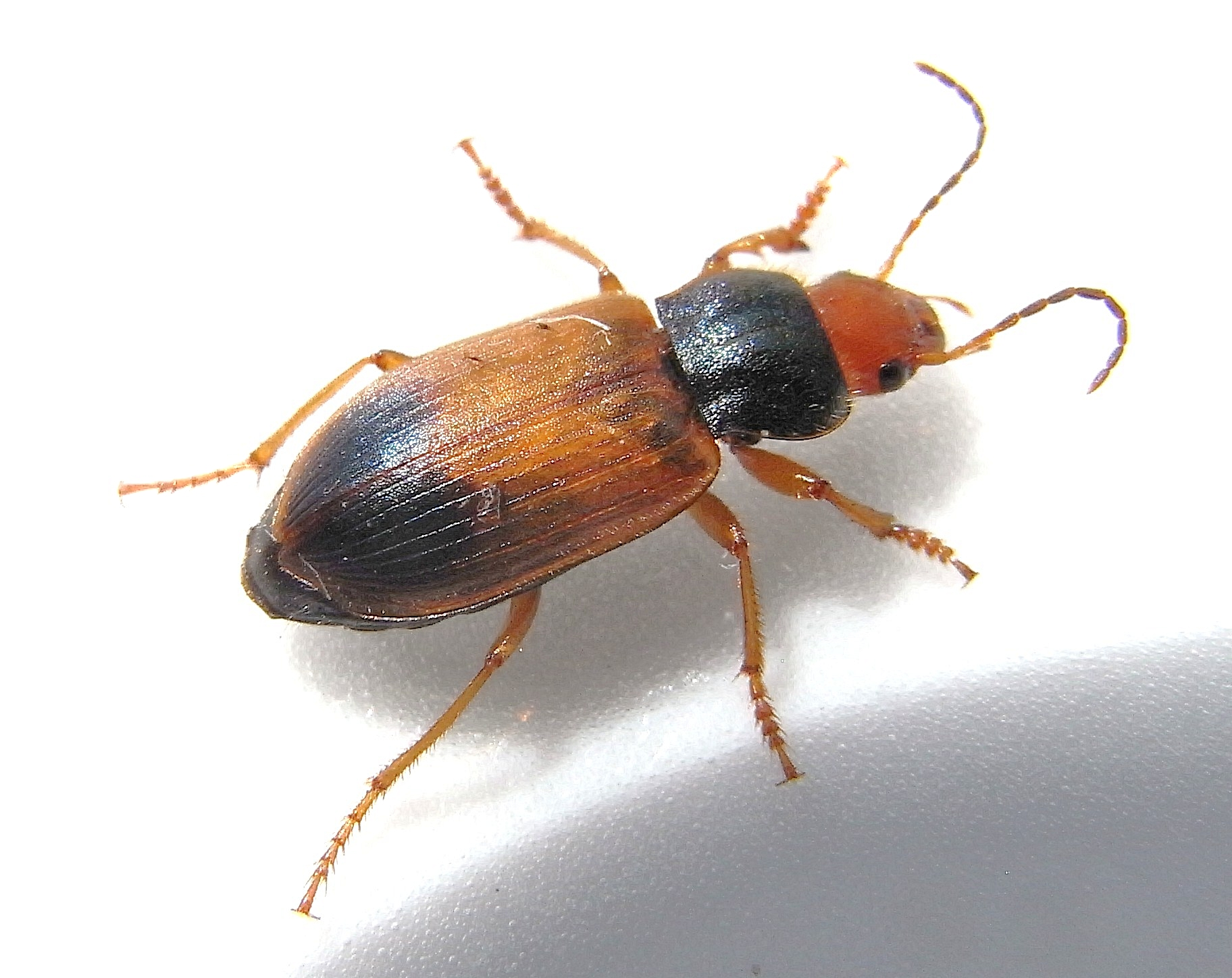
- Illustration of Diachromus germanus

Scientific classification
- Kingdom: Animalia
- Phylum: Arthropoda
- Class: Insecta
- Order: Coleoptera
- Suborder: Adephaga
- Family: Carabidae
- Genus: Diachromus
- Species: D. germanus

Binomial name
- Diachromus germanus (Linnaeus, 1758)

= Diachromus =

Species of beetle

Diachromus germanus is a species of ground beetle and the only species of the monotypic genus Diachromus.

It is native to Europe and the Near East. In Europe, it is found in Albania, Austria, Belarus, Belgium, Bosnia and Herzegovina, Bulgaria, Corsica, Crete, Croatia, the Czech Republic, mainland Denmark, mainland France, Germany, Great Britain including the Isle of Man, mainland Greece, Hungary, mainland Italy, Kaliningrad, Latvia, Liechtenstein, Luxembourg, Moldova, North Macedonia, Poland, mainland Portugal, Romania, central and southern Russia, Sardinia, Sicily, Slovakia, Slovenia, mainland Spain, Switzerland, the Netherlands, Ukraine and Yugoslavia.
