= A. harpaloides =

A. harpaloides may refer to:

- Abacetus harpaloides, a ground beetle
- Anisodactylus harpaloides, a ground beetle found in North America
