= Anisodactylus agricola =

Scientific classification
- Domain: Eukaryota
- Kingdom: Animalia
- Phylum: Arthropoda
- Class: Insecta
- Order: Coleoptera
- Suborder: Adephaga
- Family: Carabidae
- Subfamily: Harpalinae
- Tribe: Harpalini
- Genus: Anisodactylus
- Species: A. agricola

Binomial name
- Anisodactylus agricola (Say, 1823)

Species of beetle

Anisodactylus agricola is a species of ground beetle in the family Carabidae. It is found in North America.
