= Anisodactylus dulcicollis =

Scientific classification
- Kingdom: Animalia
- Phylum: Arthropoda
- Class: Insecta
- Order: Coleoptera
- Suborder: Adephaga
- Family: Carabidae
- Genus: Anisodactylus
- Species: A. dulcicollis

Binomial name
- Anisodactylus dulcicollis (LaFerté-Sénectère, 1841)

Species of beetle

Anisodactylus dulcicollis is a species of ground beetle in the family Carabidae. It is found in North America.
