= Anisodactylus ovularis =

Scientific classification
- Kingdom: Animalia
- Phylum: Arthropoda
- Class: Insecta
- Order: Coleoptera
- Suborder: Adephaga
- Family: Carabidae
- Genus: Anisodactylus
- Species: A. ovularis

Binomial name
- Anisodactylus ovularis (Casey, 1914)

Species of beetle

Anisodactylus ovularis is a species of ground beetle in the family Carabidae. It is found in North America.
