= Anisodactylus merula =

Scientific classification
- Domain: Eukaryota
- Kingdom: Animalia
- Phylum: Arthropoda
- Class: Insecta
- Order: Coleoptera
- Suborder: Adephaga
- Family: Carabidae
- Subfamily: Harpalinae
- Tribe: Harpalini
- Genus: Anisodactylus
- Species: A. merula

Binomial name
- Anisodactylus merula (Germar, 1824)

Species of beetle

Anisodactylus merula is a species of ground beetle in the family Carabidae. It is found in North America.
