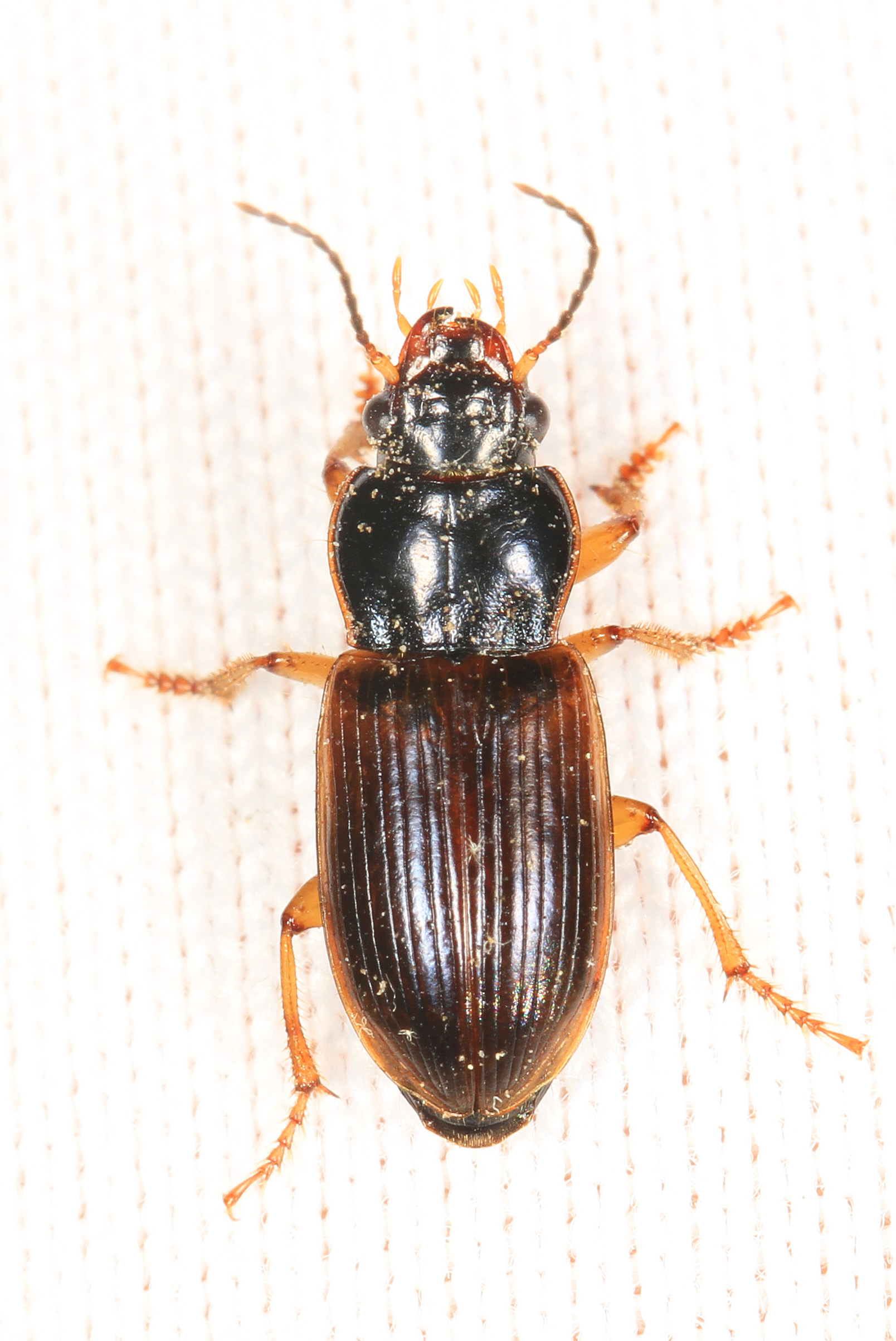

Scientific classification
- Kingdom: Animalia
- Phylum: Arthropoda
- Class: Insecta
- Order: Coleoptera
- Suborder: Adephaga
- Family: Carabidae
- Tribe: Harpalini
- Genus: Anisodactylus
- Species: A. sanctaecrucis

Binomial name
- Anisodactylus sanctaecrucis (Fabricius, 1798)

= Anisodactylus sanctaecrucis =

Species of beetle

Anisodactylus sanctaecrucis is a species of ground beetle in the family Carabidae. It is found in North America.
