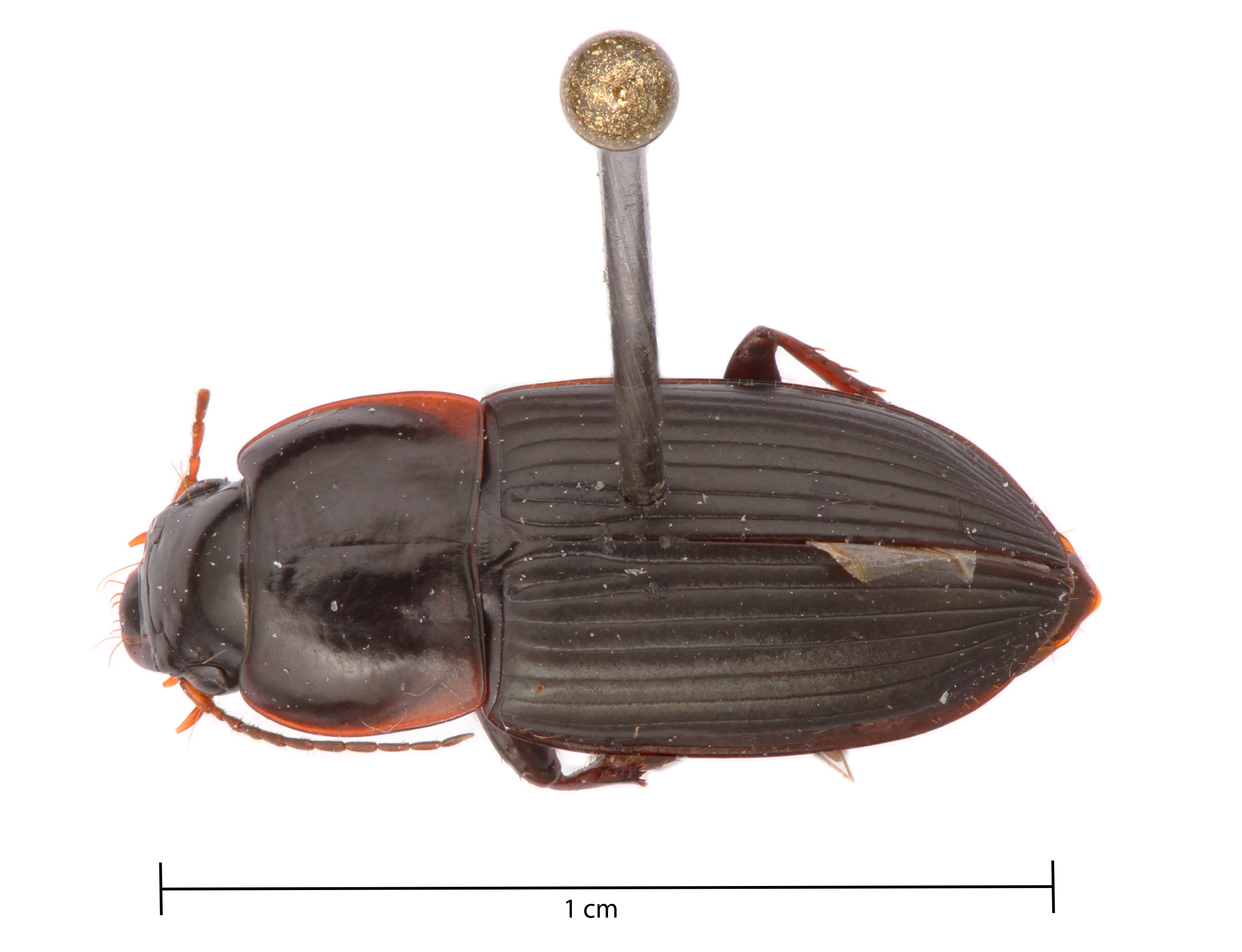

Scientific classification
- Domain: Eukaryota
- Kingdom: Animalia
- Phylum: Arthropoda
- Class: Insecta
- Order: Coleoptera
- Suborder: Adephaga
- Family: Carabidae
- Subfamily: Harpalinae
- Tribe: Harpalini
- Genus: Anisodactylus
- Species: A. opaculus

Binomial name
- Anisodactylus opaculus Leconte, 1863

= Anisodactylus opaculus =

Species of beetle

Anisodactylus opaculus is a ground beetle in the family Carabidae ("ground beetles"), in the suborder Adephaga ("ground and water beetles"). Anisodactylus opaculus is found in North America.
