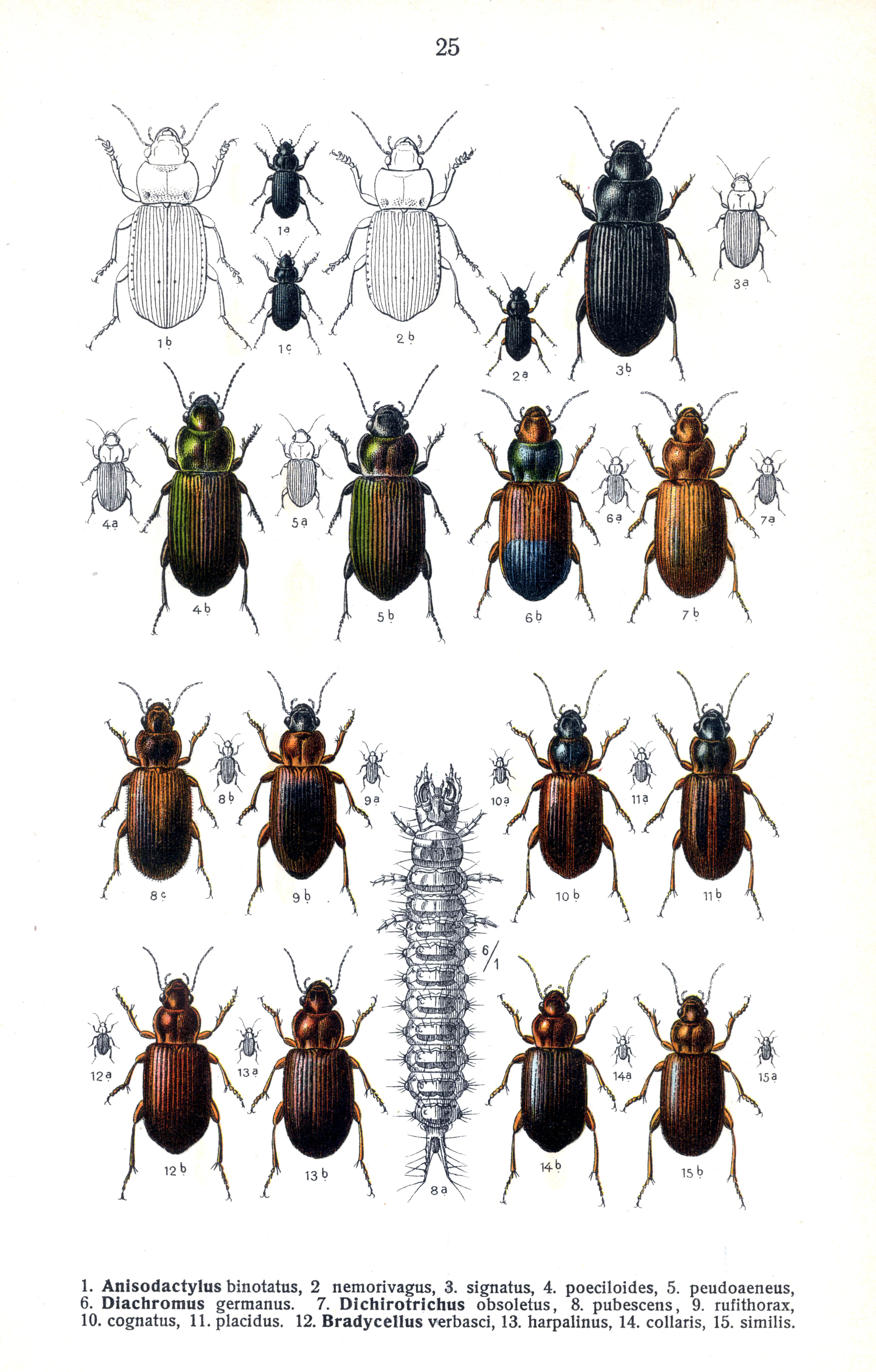

Scientific classification
- Kingdom: Animalia
- Phylum: Arthropoda
- Class: Insecta
- Order: Coleoptera
- Suborder: Adephaga
- Family: Carabidae
- Tribe: Harpalini
- Subtribe: Anisodactylina
- Genus: Anisodactylus
- Species: A. nemorivagus

Binomial name
- Anisodactylus nemorivagus (Duftschmid, 1812)

= Anisodactylus nemorivagus =

Species of beetle

Anisodactylus nemorivagus is a species of ground beetle native to Europe.
