= Anisodactylus anthracinus =

Scientific classification
- Kingdom: Animalia
- Phylum: Arthropoda
- Class: Insecta
- Order: Coleoptera
- Suborder: Adephaga
- Family: Carabidae
- Tribe: Harpalini
- Genus: Anisodactylus
- Species: A. anthracinus

Binomial name
- Anisodactylus anthracinus (Dejean, 1829)

Species of beetle

Anisodactylus anthracinus is a species of ground beetle in the family Carabidae. It is found in North America.
