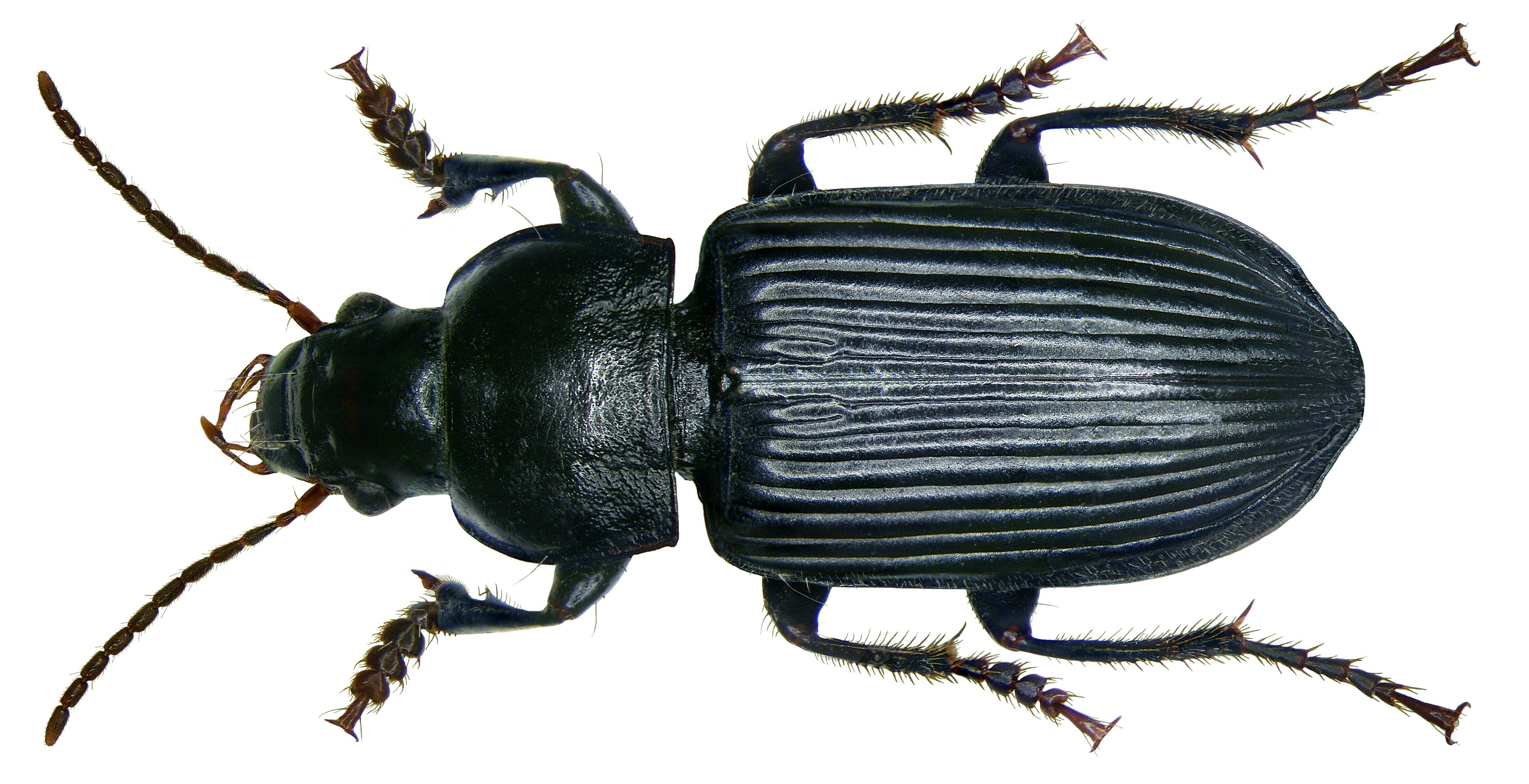

Scientific classification
- Kingdom: Animalia
- Phylum: Arthropoda
- Clade: Pancrustacea
- Class: Insecta
- Order: Coleoptera
- Suborder: Adephaga
- Family: Carabidae
- Tribe: Harpalini
- Subtribe: Anisodactylina
- Genus: Anisodactylus
- Species: A. binotatus

Binomial name
- Anisodactylus binotatus (Fabricius, 1787)

= Anisodactylus binotatus =

Species of beetle

Anisodactylus binotatus is a species of ground beetle native to Europe. It was discovered as being introduced to Canterbury, New Zealand in 1938. Anisodactylus binotatus (Fabricius, 1787) is a species of Carabidae, also known as the ground beetle family. Although this species of beetle has no official recorded common names, literature from England refers to it as the common shortspur beetle.

== Description ==
A. binotatus ranges from 10–12.7 mm (0.39–0.50 in) in length and has shiny black colouration. This shine is not metallic but a black polish shine. This black colouration is present on the head, pronotum, and femora. The pronotum is the first segment or hard plate that protects the thorax. The femora is the leg segment which connects to the tibia and coxa

A defining feature of the order Coleoptera is a hardened pair of forewings. This feature is referred to as the elytra. Because Anisodactylus binotatus belongs to Coleoptera, it too has these leather- like hardened forewings which are black. The elytra has a uniform impressed pattern, with small evenly spaced 'crinkle'-like waves in the elytra. Setae which look like light hairs can be found at the base or apex of the elytra and down the side

The tibia (leg segment connected to the femora) and tarsi (gripping segments on 'feet') have a light brown or red-black colouration. A defining feature of this beetle is the basal segment of the posterior tarsus being twice the length of the second tarsal segment. The Anisodactylus genus can be recognized by the length of its apical spur on the hind tibia. The first segment on the antennae are red-brown with the remaining segments black. The antennae reach the base of the pronotum

A distinctive feature of Anisodactylus binotatus is a red spot between the eyes on frons. The frons are the plate/segment of the exoskeleton which make up the front of the head between the eyes down to the mouth. Some individuals of this species have two separate red spots on the frons, this spot is elongated horizontally. The shoulders of this species are a defining feature as they are strongly developed and slightly rounded

== Geographic distribution ==
A. binotatus is native to Europe but can be found around the world. This species can be found in North America in states near the coast, throughout Europe, and in the Portuguese Islands. In the United Kingdom, this beetle has an extensive distribution. It can be found throughout England, Ireland and Wales. In lowland Scotland, it is a fairly common species.

The Anisodactylus genus currently contains around twenty-one species. Fifteen species are found in the Northern Hemisphere and six in the Southern Hemisphere. Specifically, thirteen are found in North America and are considered native. One species only occurs in Northern Africa and one other species occurs in both Africa and South West Eurasia. Six species exist in Eurasia.

== New Zealand range ==
This exotic species of ground beetle first established in Christchurch, New Zealand in 1938 and has since spread across mid Canterbury. To date, A. binotatus can be found throughout both the North and South islands of New Zealand. In the North Island, they can be found in the Wellington region, in the South Island they can be found in South and Mid Canterbury, Otago Lakes, Central Otago, and Dunedin.

== Habitat ==
A. binotatus can be found under substrate such as logs, stones, and plant debris. They can also be found in fields and soil burrows like many other ground beetles. Interestingly, A. binotatus are lowland dwelling and can often be found near water sources such as peat bogs, and near the lake banks. Explaining their preference for moderately moist soil conditions and clay loam soils. As demonstrated by its geographical distribution A. binotatus is an exceptionally successful colonist. Part of this could be because it can survive in habitats and niches of anthropogenic origin. Some of these habitats include reservoirs, greenhouses, dumps, and cultivated fields with grass or herbaceous cover.

== Life cycle/Phenology ==
While not much is known about the natural history and phenology of Anisodactylus binotatus, a study done in Europe on the life cycles of Carabidae included Anisodactylus signatus which belongs to the same genus. Based on the similarity of these species it is possible to suggest that Anisodactylus binotatus has an annual life cycle, where a new generation is produced each year.

Larvae undergo their development within several months and emerge as adults. In New Zealand during April larvae of this species tend to undergo imago, (the final development and growth stage for winged insects) forming a pupa. The Anisodactylus genus is suggested to have a summer reproductive rhythm. In New Zealand during September to April this species is most reproductively active. During the colder months, like many ground beetles they are relatively inactive. As suggested in European research, they could be in a state of hibernation.

Eleven species of the Carabidae family show behaviors of parental care from the females towards their larvae and eggs. Because A. binotatus belongs to Carabidae it is possible that it to has this parental behavior towards its offspring.

Carabidae stay underground during the larval stage of their life. Once larvae have emerged from metamorphosis as adults, the beetles begin to live on the surface. As adults they tend to be nocturnal but can sometimes be active during warm days.

In the UK A. binotatus can use the wings which develop during the pupal stage for flight as an adult. This is suggested to have impacted the global distribution as it allows the species to move larger distances and disperse easier than many other flightless Carabidae.

== Diet and foraging ==
Based on a study in Europe, A. binotatus larvae are carnivorous, feeding on small worms and Mollusca. species Adults become omnivorous, also feeding on small seeds and strawberries. Other studies suggest that it primarily feeds on seeds during its adult stage

== Predators, parasites, and diseases ==
There are many bird species and introduced pest predators that feed on New Zealand ground beetles. Starlings and kiwi are the most common predator for ground beetles, as well as hedgehogs. Birds such as Magpies, king fishers, fernbirds, and thrushes, as well as mammals including stoats, feral cats, rats, and even asilids are also occasional predators of the ground beetles.

Spiders appear to be one of the largest and most relevant predators to Carabidae. Spider predation in open fields of grasses/tussocks, fell fields, and fields with many herbaceous plants is most common.

Parasites in the form of mites and fungi can be found on many ground beetle species. About 137 species of carabid beetles observed have been found carrying Acari (mites), and 48 species can be infected with Laboulbeniales which is a parasitic biotrophic fungi.
