= Anisodactylus alternans =

Scientific classification
- Domain: Eukaryota
- Kingdom: Animalia
- Phylum: Arthropoda
- Class: Insecta
- Order: Coleoptera
- Suborder: Adephaga
- Family: Carabidae
- Subfamily: Harpalinae
- Tribe: Harpalini
- Genus: Anisodactylus
- Species: A. alternans

Binomial name
- Anisodactylus alternans (Motschulsky, 1845)

Synonyms
- Anisodactylus nivalis G. Horn, 1880

Species of beetle

Anisodactylus alternans is a species of ground beetle in the family Carabidae. It is found in North America.
