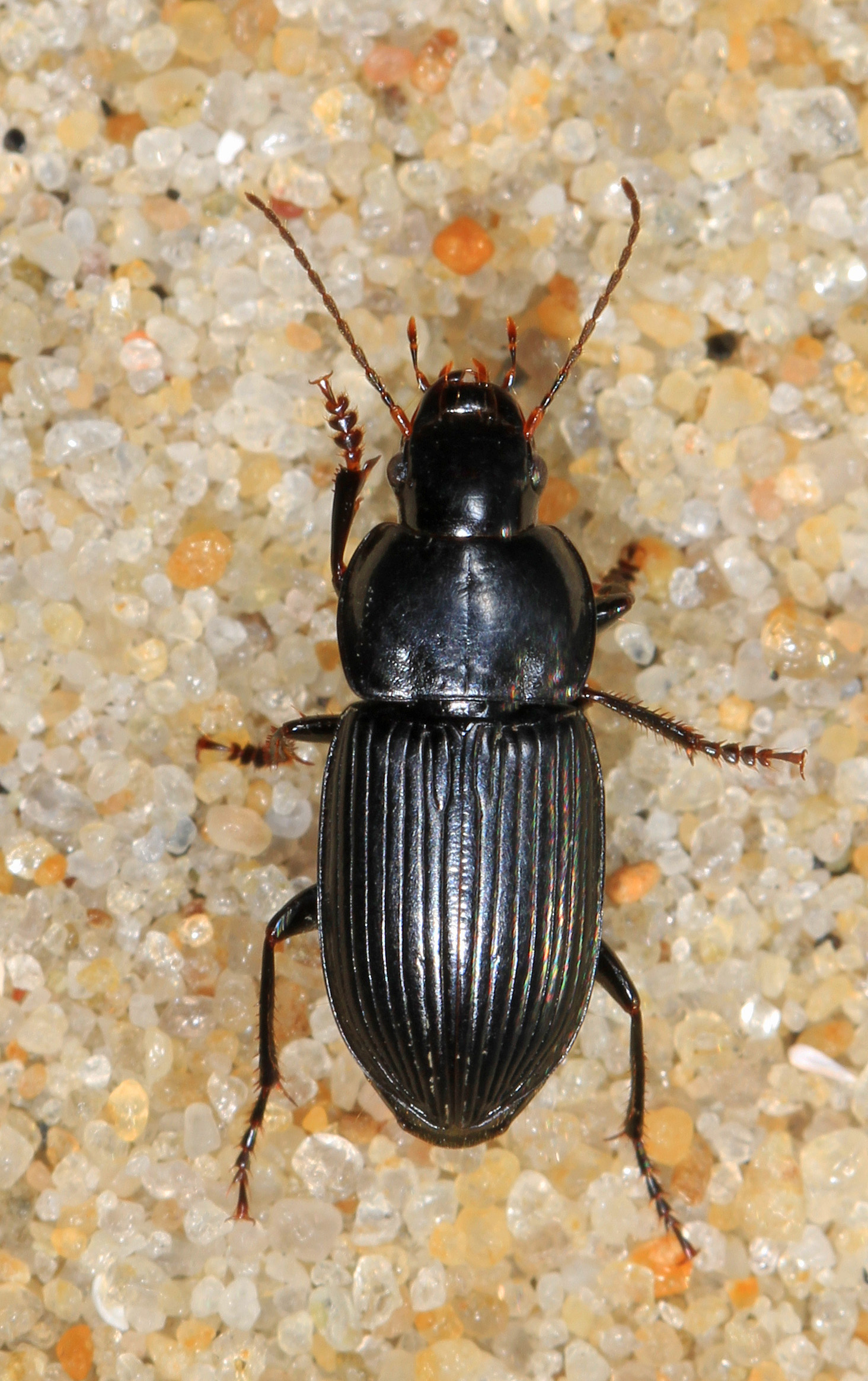
- Ground Beetle - Anisodactylus harrisii, Chincoteague National Wildlife Refuge, Chincoteague, Virginia

Scientific classification
- Domain: Eukaryota
- Kingdom: Animalia
- Phylum: Arthropoda
- Class: Insecta
- Order: Coleoptera
- Suborder: Adephaga
- Family: Carabidae
- Subfamily: Harpalinae
- Tribe: Harpalini
- Genus: Anisodactylus
- Species: A. harrisii

Binomial name
- Anisodactylus harrisii LeConte, 1863

= Anisodactylus harrisii =

Species of beetle

Anisodactylus harrisii is a species of ground beetle in the family Carabidae. It is found in North America.
