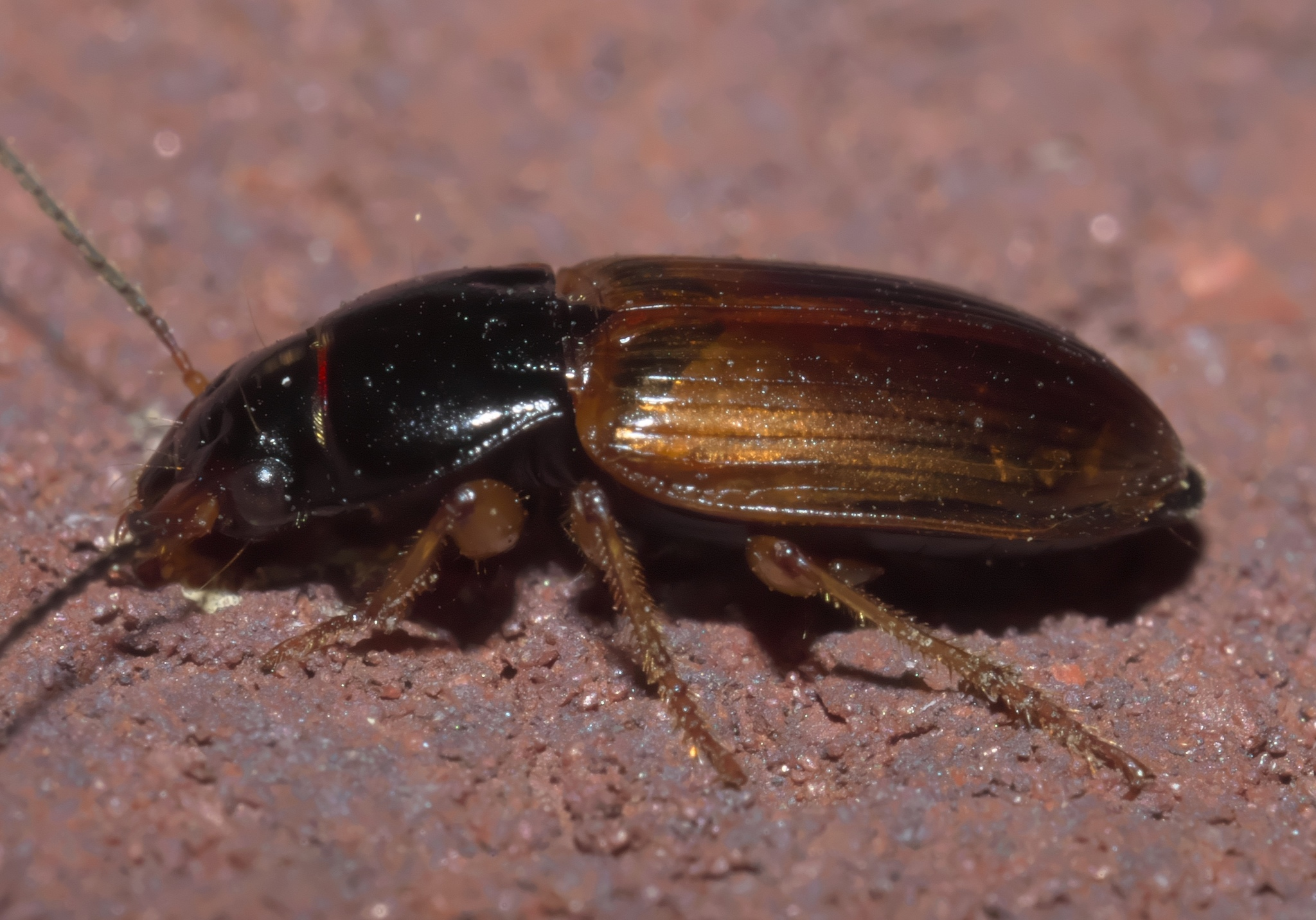
- Anisodactylus sanctaecrucis, Oklahoma

Scientific classification
- Domain: Eukaryota
- Kingdom: Animalia
- Phylum: Arthropoda
- Class: Insecta
- Order: Coleoptera
- Suborder: Adephaga
- Family: Carabidae
- Subfamily: Harpalinae
- Tribe: Harpalini
- Subtribe: Anisodactylina
- Genus: Anisodactylus; Dejean, 1829

Subgenera
- Anadaptus; Anisodactylus; Aplocentrus; Gynandrotarsus; Hexatrichus Tschitscherine, 1898; Pseudanisodactylus Noonan, 1973; Pseudaplocentrus Noonan, 1973; Pseudodichirus Lutshnik, 1921; Spongopus LeConte, 1847

= Anisodactylus =

Genus of beetles

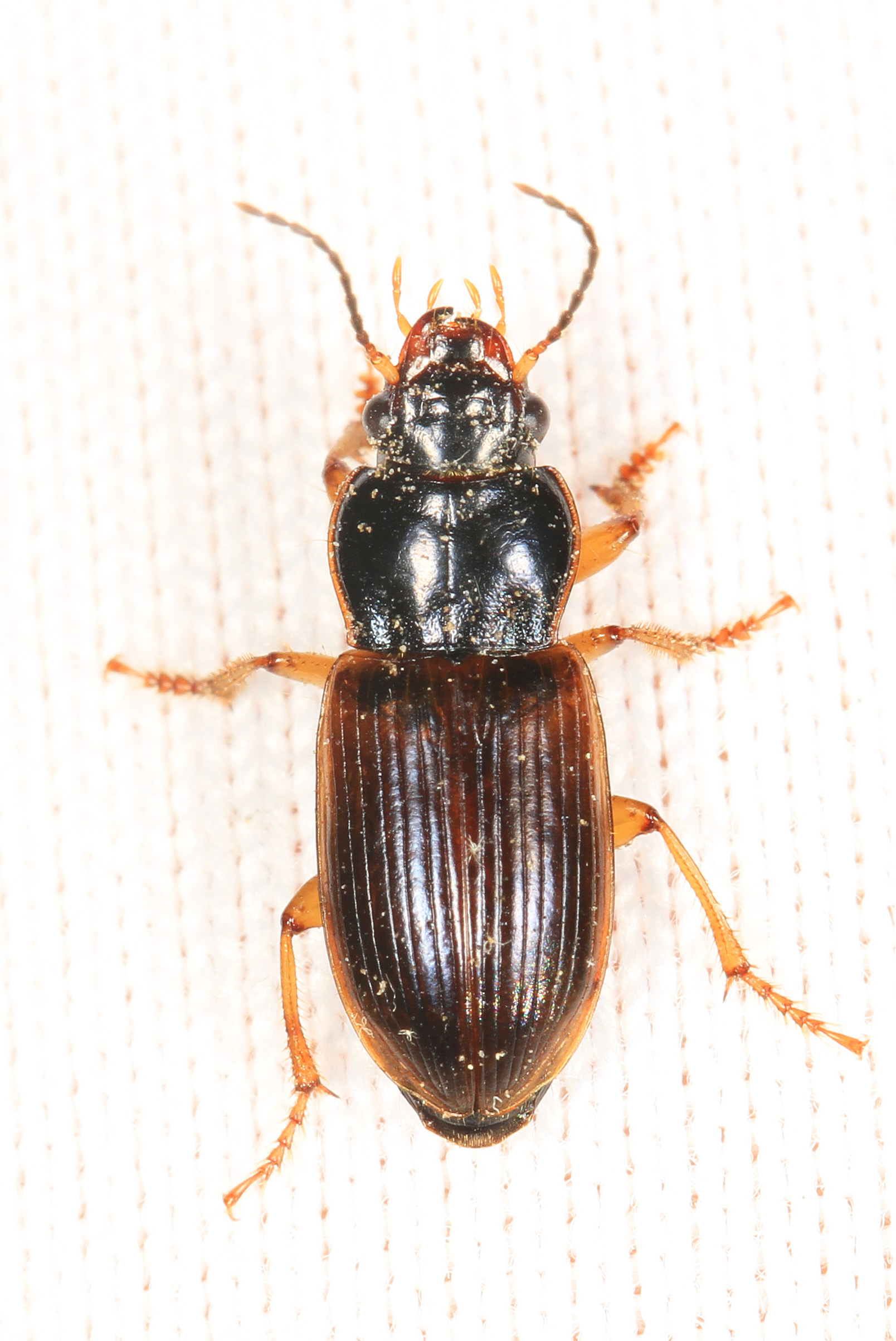
Anisodactylus sanctaecrucis, Maryland

Anisodactylus is a genus of ground beetle native to the Palearctic (including Europe), the Near East and North Africa.

== Species ==
These 54 species belong to the genus Anisodactylus:

- Anisodactylus afghanus Schauberger, 1929
- Anisodactylus agricola (Say, 1823)
- Anisodactylus alternans (Motschulsky, 1845)
- Anisodactylus amaroides LeConte, 1851
- Anisodactylus anthracinus (Dejean, 1829)
- Anisodactylus antoinei Puel, 1931
- Anisodactylus binotatus (Fabricius, 1787)
- Anisodactylus caenus (Say, 1823)
- Anisodactylus californicus Dejean, 1829
- Anisodactylus carbonarius (Say, 1823)
- Anisodactylus consobrinus LeConte, 1851
- Anisodactylus cuneatus Karsch, 1881
- Anisodactylus darlingtoni Noonan, 1973
- Anisodactylus discoideus Dejean, 1831
- Anisodactylus dulcicollis (LaFerté-Sénectère, 1841)
- Anisodactylus emarginatus N.Ito, 2003
- Anisodactylus furvus LeConte, 1863
- Anisodactylus haplomus Chaudoir, 1868
- Anisodactylus harpaloides (LaFerté-Sénectère, 1841)
- Anisodactylus harrisii LeConte, 1863
- Anisodactylus heros (Fabricius, 1801)
- Anisodactylus hispanus Puel, 1931
- Anisodactylus intermedius Dejean, 1829
- Anisodactylus karennius (Bates, 1892)
- Anisodactylus kirbyi Lindroth, 1953
- Anisodactylus laetus Dejean, 1829
- Anisodactylus lodingi Schaeffer, 1911
- Anisodactylus mandschuricus Jedlicka, 1942
- Anisodactylus melanopus (Haldeman, 1843)
- Anisodactylus merula (Germar, 1823)
- Anisodactylus nemorivagus (Duftschmid, 1812)
- Anisodactylus nigerrimus (Dejean, 1831)
- Anisodactylus nigrita Dejean, 1829
- Anisodactylus nivalis G.Horn, 1880
- Anisodactylus opaculus (LeConte, 1863)
- Anisodactylus ovularis (Casey, 1914)
- Anisodactylus pitychrous LeConte, 1861
- Anisodactylus poeciloides (Stephens, 1828)
- Anisodactylus porosus (Motschulsky, 1845)
- Anisodactylus pseudagricola Noonan, 1996
- Anisodactylus pueli Schauberger, 1933
- Anisodactylus punctatipennis A.Morawitz, 1862
- Anisodactylus rotundangulus Bates, 1878
- Anisodactylus rudis LeConte, 1863
- Anisodactylus rusticus (Say, 1823)
- Anisodactylus sadoensis Schauberger, 1932
- Anisodactylus sanctaecrucis (Fabricius, 1798)
- Anisodactylus signatus (Panzer, 1796)
- Anisodactylus similis LeConte, 1851
- Anisodactylus texanus Schaeffer, 1910
- Anisodactylus tricuspidatus A.Morawitz, 1863
- Anisodactylus verticalis (LeConte, 1847)
- Anisodactylus virens Dejean, 1829
- † Anisodactylus giganteus Zhang; Liu & Shangguan, 1989
