= Notophilus =

Notophilus may refer to:

- Notophilus, a genus of beetles in the family Carabidae; synonym of Amblystomus
- Notophilus, a genus of flowering plants in the family Ranunculaceae; synonym of Ranunculus
