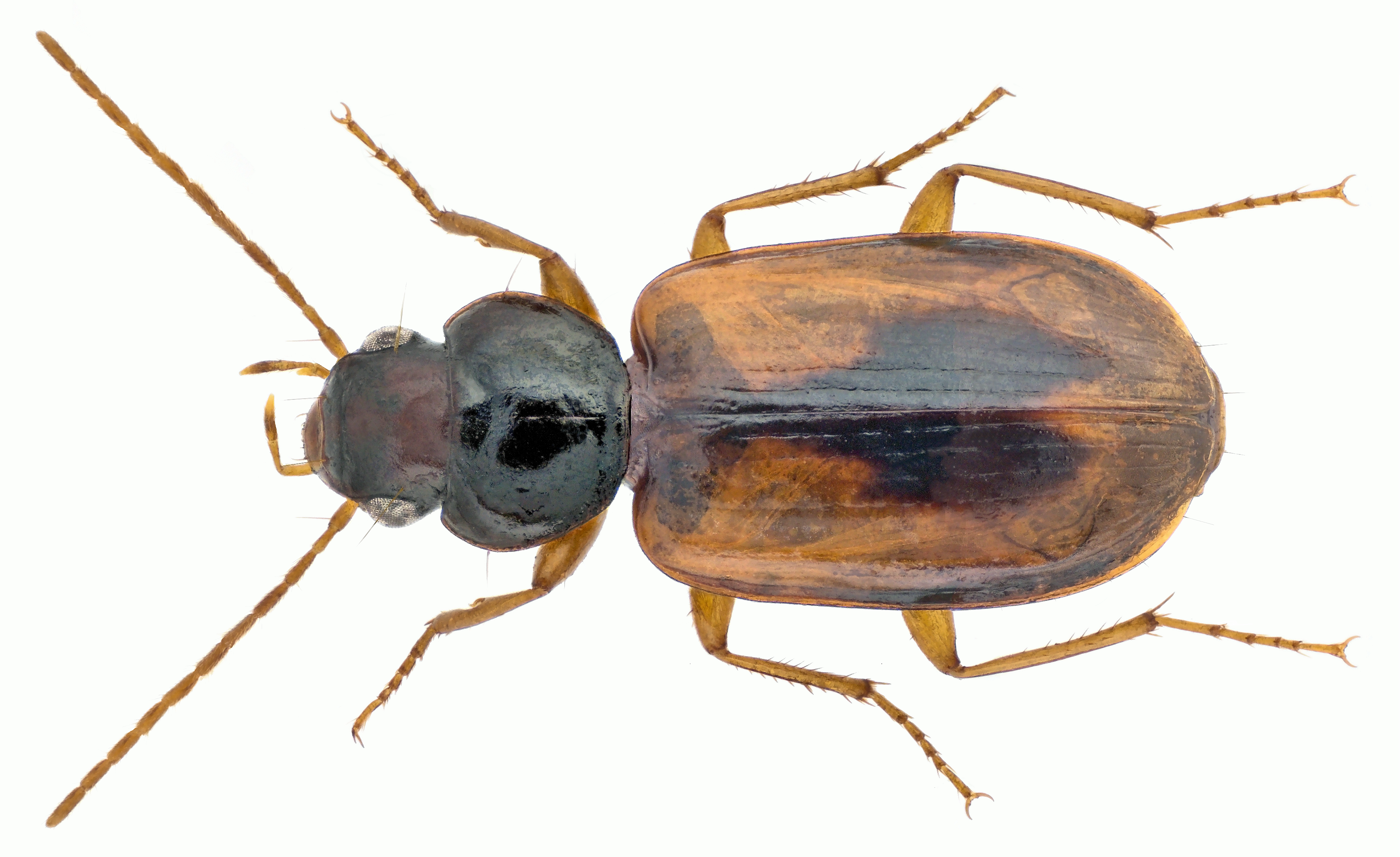
- Amblystomus amabilis

Scientific classification
- Kingdom: Animalia
- Phylum: Arthropoda
- Class: Insecta
- Order: Coleoptera
- Suborder: Adephaga
- Family: Carabidae
- Subfamily: Harpalinae
- Tribe: Harpalini
- Subtribe: Amblystomina
- Genus: Amblystomus; Erichson, 1837

Synonyms
- Notophilus Blackburn, 1888

= Amblystomus =

Genus of beetles

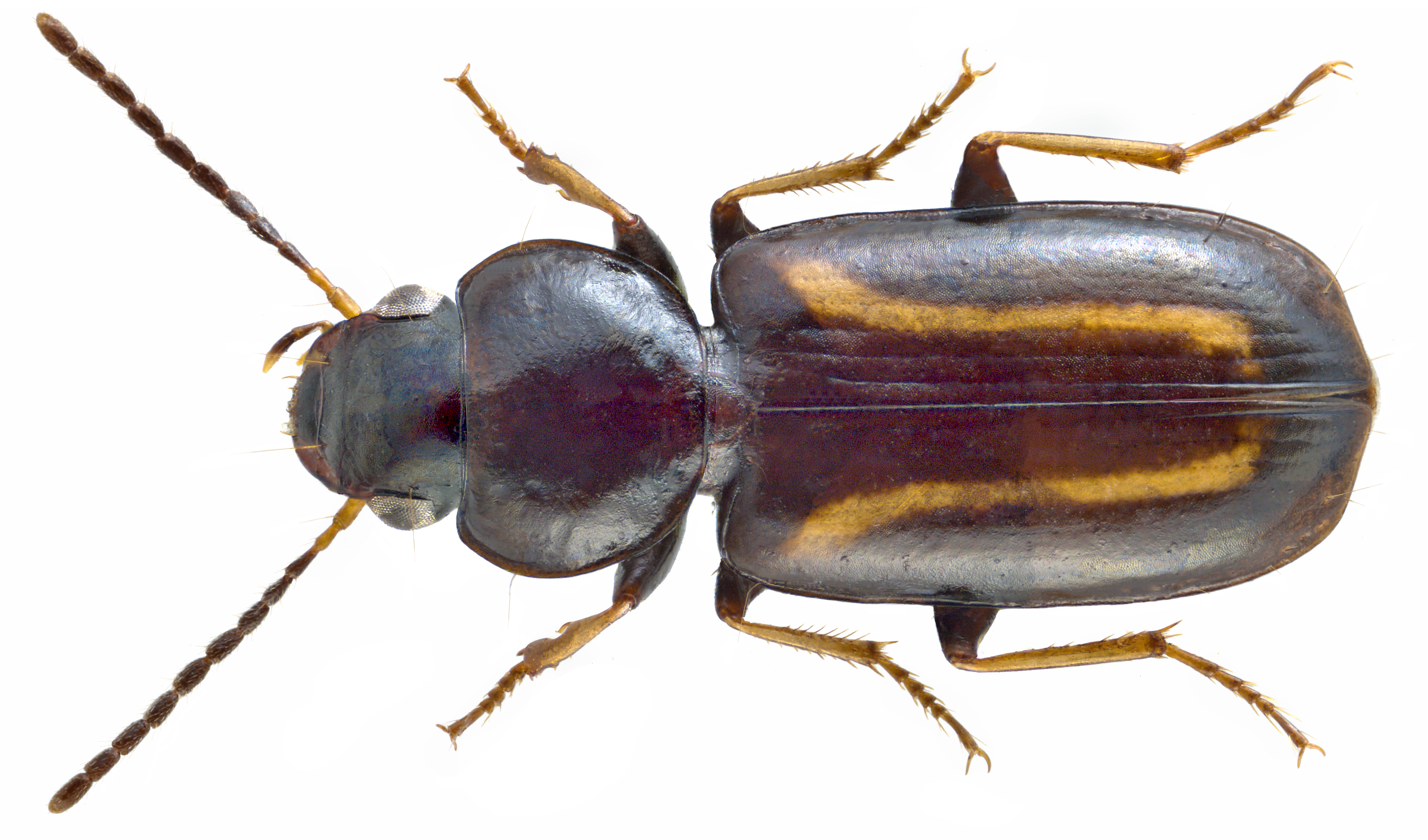
Amblystomus orpheus

Amblystomus is a genus in the beetle family Carabidae. Its species are found mainly in Africa, Asia, Europe, and Australia.

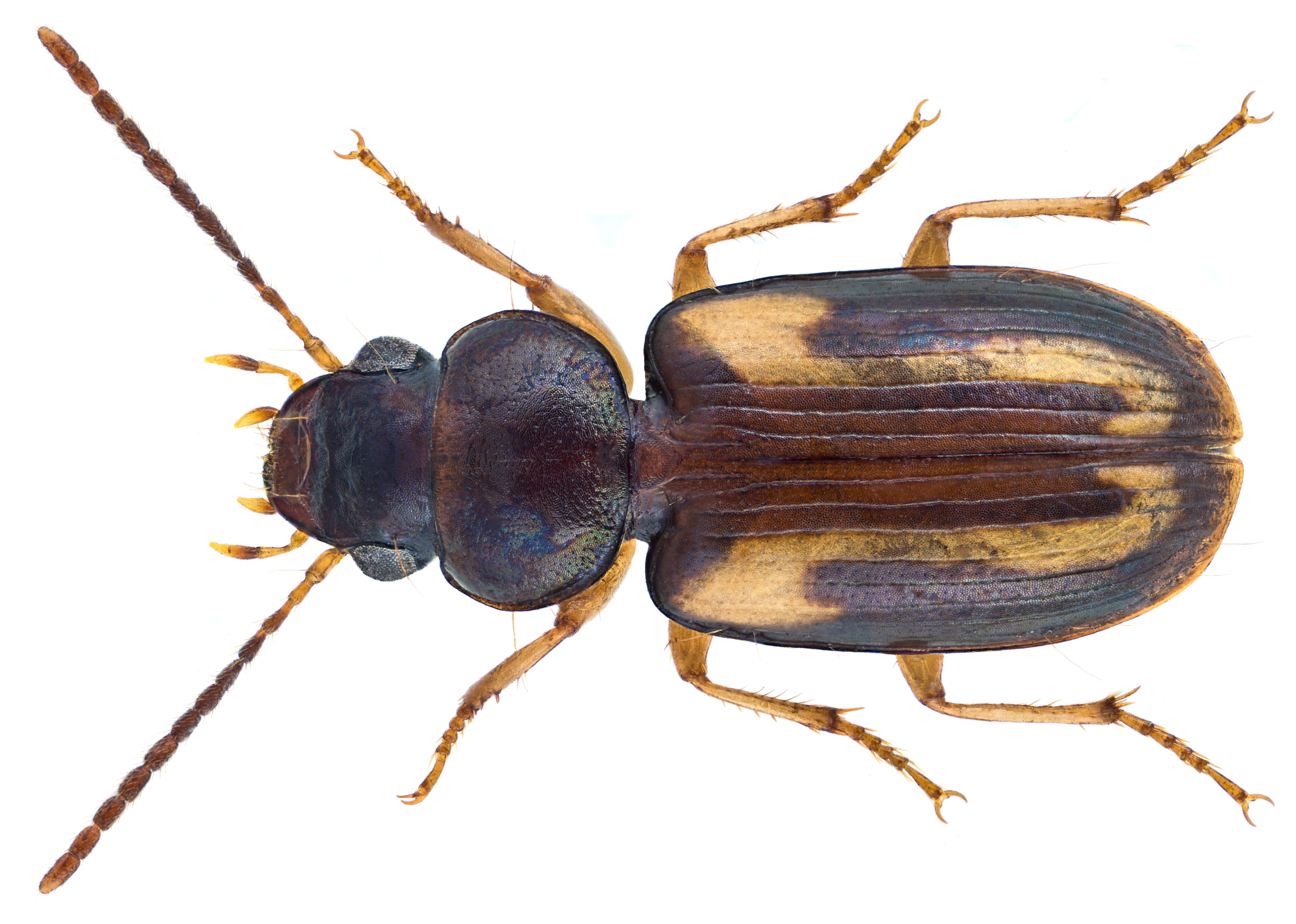
Amblystomus quadrisignatus

== Species ==
These 127 species belong to the genus Amblystomus:

- Amblystomus aeneolus Chaudoir, 1876
- Amblystomus aenescens Motschulsky, 1858
- Amblystomus alberti Basilewsky, 1951
- Amblystomus algirinus Reitter, 1887
- Amblystomus amabilis Boheman, 1848
- Amblystomus anthracinus Sloane, 1898
- Amblystomus australis Motschulsky, 1864
- Amblystomus basalis Péringuey, 1896
- Amblystomus bayeri Burgeon, 1935
- Amblystomus bilineatus G. Müller, 1942
- Amblystomus biplagiatus G. Müller, 1942
- Amblystomus bivittatus Andrewes, 1919
- Amblystomus blandus Péringuey, 1896
- Amblystomus breviceps Andrewes, 1947
- Amblystomus capensis Motschulsky, 1864
- Amblystomus cephalotes Reitter, 1896
- Amblystomus chalceus Andrewes, 1930
- Amblystomus colasi Basilewsky, 1948
- Amblystomus convexus W.S. MacLeay, 1825
- Amblystomus cuneatus Landin, 1955
- Amblystomus dantei Facchini, 2012
- Amblystomus decaryi Alluaud, 1935
- Amblystomus dispar Basilewsky, 1951
- Amblystomus dorsiger G. Müller, 1942
- Amblystomus dromioides Bates, 1889
- Amblystomus eburneus Basilewsky, 1951
- Amblystomus eduardinus Burgeon, 1935
- Amblystomus escorialensis Gautier des Cottes, 1866
- Amblystomus femoralis Motschulsky, 1858
- Amblystomus flavipes Motschulsky, 1858
- Amblystomus fuscescens Motschulsky, 1858
- Amblystomus gagatinus W.J. MacLeay, 1871
- Amblystomus geayi Alluaud, 1935
- Amblystomus gracilis Blackburn, 1888
- Amblystomus guttatus Bates, 1873
- Amblystomus guttula Dejean, 1831
- Amblystomus hessei Basilewsky, 1948
- Amblystomus ignobilis Andrewes, 1947
- Amblystomus imerinae Jeannel, 1948
- Amblystomus indicus Nietner, 1858
- Amblystomus indotatus Basilewsky, 1946
- Amblystomus inflaticeps Andrewes, 1947
- Amblystomus intermedius Péringuey, 1898
- Amblystomus iranicus Jedlicka, 1961
- Amblystomus jeanneli Basilewsky, 1948
- Amblystomus katanganus Burgeon, 1935
- Amblystomus kenyanus Facchini, 2005
- Amblystomus labroexcisus Facchini, 2012
- Amblystomus laetus Blackburn, 1888
- Amblystomus latefasciatus Basilewsky, 1963
- Amblystomus laticeps Andrewes, 1933
- Amblystomus latus Andrewes, 1947
- Amblystomus lepineyi Alluaud, 1934
- Amblystomus louwerensi Landin, 1955
- Amblystomus mandibularis Nietner, 1858
- Amblystomus mauritanicus Dejean, 1829
- Amblystomus melonii Wrase & Magrini, 2012
- Amblystomus metallescens Dejean, 1829
- Amblystomus metallicus Blackburn, 1888
- Amblystomus metrius Basilewsky, 1951
- Amblystomus minimus Dejean, 1829
- Amblystomus minutulus Basilewsky, 1946
- Amblystomus minutus Laporte, 1867
- Amblystomus montanus Blackburn, 1891
- Amblystomus natalicus Péringuey, 1896
- Amblystomus niger Heer, 1841
- Amblystomus nigrinus Csiki, 1931
- Amblystomus nigrofemoratus Basilewsky, 1946
- Amblystomus nitidiceps G. Müller, 1942
- Amblystomus notabilis Landin, 1955
- Amblystomus nyassicus Facchini, 2015
- Amblystomus obliquus (Sloane, 1898)
- Amblystomus omoxanthus Basilewsky, 1948
- Amblystomus ornatipennis (Boheman, 1848)
- Amblystomus orpheus LaFerté-Sénectère, 1853
- Amblystomus ovalis Sloane, 1900
- Amblystomus pallidicolor G. Müller, 1942
- Amblystomus pallidipennis Facchini, 2015
- Amblystomus pallipes Motschulsky, 1858
- Amblystomus palustris Blackburn, 1888
- Amblystomus parvus Blackburn, 1888
- Amblystomus photophilus Basilewsky, 1948
- Amblystomus picinus Baudi di Selve, 1864
- Amblystomus poggii Facchini, 2005
- Amblystomus posticalis Basilewsky, 1953
- Amblystomus pulchellus G. Müller, 1942
- Amblystomus punctatus Bates, 1892
- Amblystomus quadriguttatus Motschulsky, 1858
- Amblystomus quadrillum Dejean, 1829
- Amblystomus quadrimaculatus Facchini, 2005
- Amblystomus quadrinotatus Dejean, 1831
- Amblystomus quadripustulatus Jeannel, 1948
- Amblystomus quadrisignatus (Boheman, 1848)
- Amblystomus raymondi Gautier des Cottes, 1861
- Amblystomus rectangulus Reitter, 1883
- Amblystomus regularis Landin, 1955
- Amblystomus resectus Andrewes, 1924
- Amblystomus rotundiceps Bates, 1892
- Amblystomus rutshuruanus Basilewsky, 1951
- Amblystomus sardous Baudi di Selve, 1864
- Amblystomus scitus Péringuey, 1896
- Amblystomus seriepunctatus Basilewsky, 1948
- Amblystomus seyrigi Alluaud, 1935
- Amblystomus similis Landin, 1955
- Amblystomus sinuaticollis Facchini, 2015
- Amblystomus sloanei Andrewes, 1936
- Amblystomus solskyi Reiche, 1864
- Amblystomus somalicus Basilewsky, 1948
- Amblystomus stenolophoides Nietner, 1858
- Amblystomus striatus Landin, 1955
- Amblystomus subviridulus Basilewsky, 1948
- Amblystomus sudanicus Basilewsky, 1946
- Amblystomus suspectus Landin, 1955
- Amblystomus suturellus Basilewsky, 1963
- Amblystomus suturifer G. Müller, 1942
- Amblystomus tchadicus Basilewsky, 1948
- Amblystomus tetrasemus Chaudoir, 1878
- Amblystomus umbrifer Chaudoir, 1876
- Amblystomus umbrinus Landin, 1955
- Amblystomus unicolor Facchini, 2005
- Amblystomus versicolor Basilewsky, 1948
- Amblystomus villiersanus Bruneau de Miré, 1991
- Amblystomus villiersi Basilewsky, 1964
- Amblystomus viridulus Erichson, 1843
- Amblystomus vittipennis Boheman, 1848
- Amblystomus vulneratus Dejean, 1831
- Amblystomus zambezianus Basilewsky, 1948
