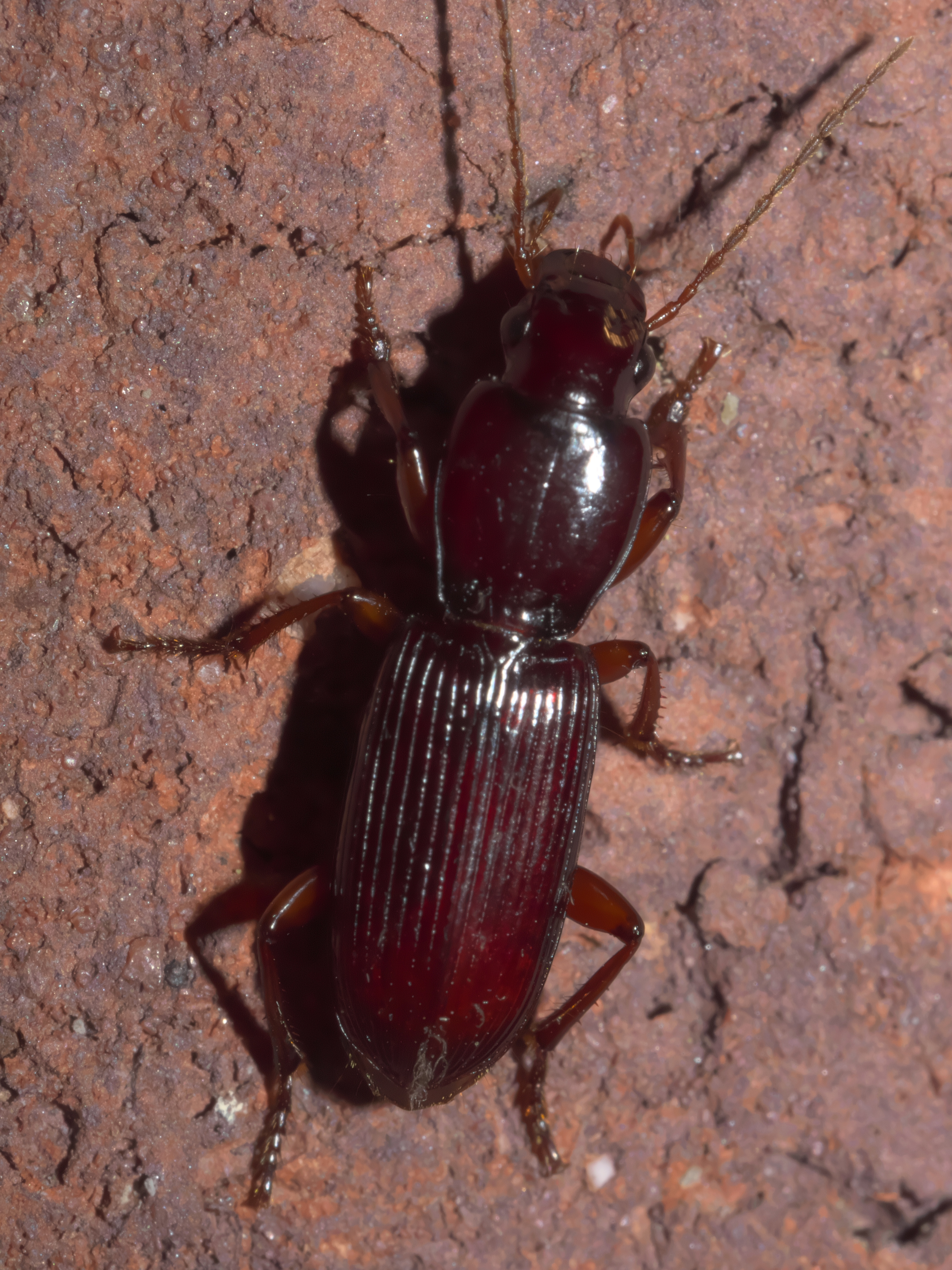
- Stenomorphus californicus rufipes

Scientific classification
- Domain: Eukaryota
- Kingdom: Animalia
- Phylum: Arthropoda
- Class: Insecta
- Order: Coleoptera
- Suborder: Adephaga
- Family: Carabidae
- Subfamily: Harpalinae
- Tribe: Harpalini
- Subtribe: Harpalina
- Genus: Stenomorphus
- Species: S. californicus

Binomial name
- Stenomorphus californicus (Ménétriés, 1843)

Synonyms
- Stenomorphus rossi Van Dyke, 1943

= Stenomorphus californicus =

Species of beetle

Stenomorphus californicus is a species of ground beetle in the family Carabidae. It is found in North America.

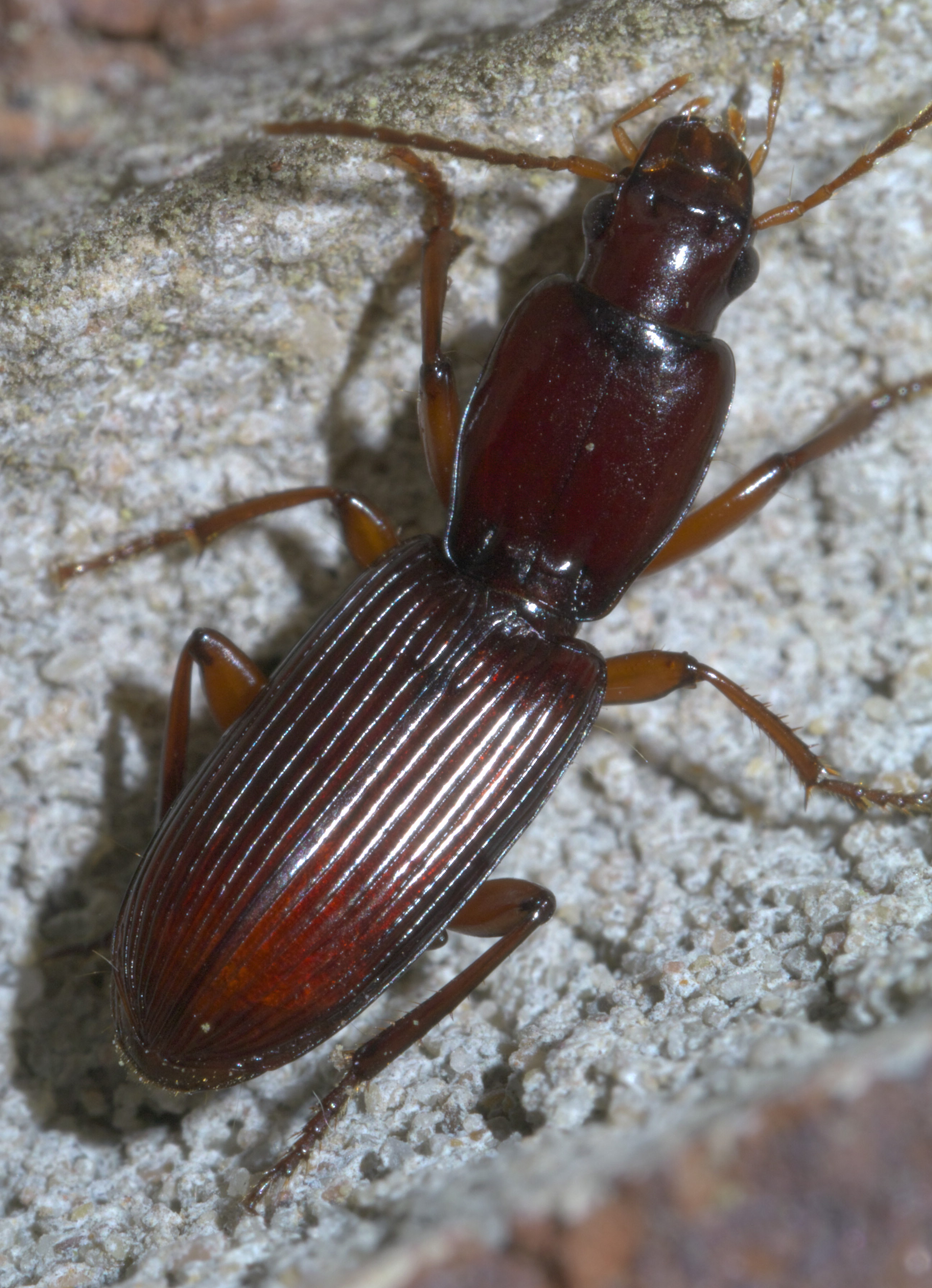
Stenomorphus californicus rufipes

== Subspecies ==
These four subspecies belong to the species Stenomorphus californicus:

- Stenomorphus californicus californicus (Ménétriés, 1843)
- Stenomorphus californicus darlingtoni Ball & Shpeley&Currie, 1991
- Stenomorphus californicus manni Darlington, 1934
- Stenomorphus californicus rufipes LeConte, 1858
