= Stenomorphus convexior =

Scientific classification
- Domain: Eukaryota
- Kingdom: Animalia
- Phylum: Arthropoda
- Class: Insecta
- Order: Coleoptera
- Suborder: Adephaga
- Family: Carabidae
- Subfamily: Harpalinae
- Tribe: Harpalini
- Subtribe: Harpalina
- Genus: Stenomorphus
- Species: S. convexior

Binomial name
- Stenomorphus convexior Notman, 1922

Species of beetle

Stenomorphus convexior is a species of ground beetle in the family Carabidae. It is found in North America.
