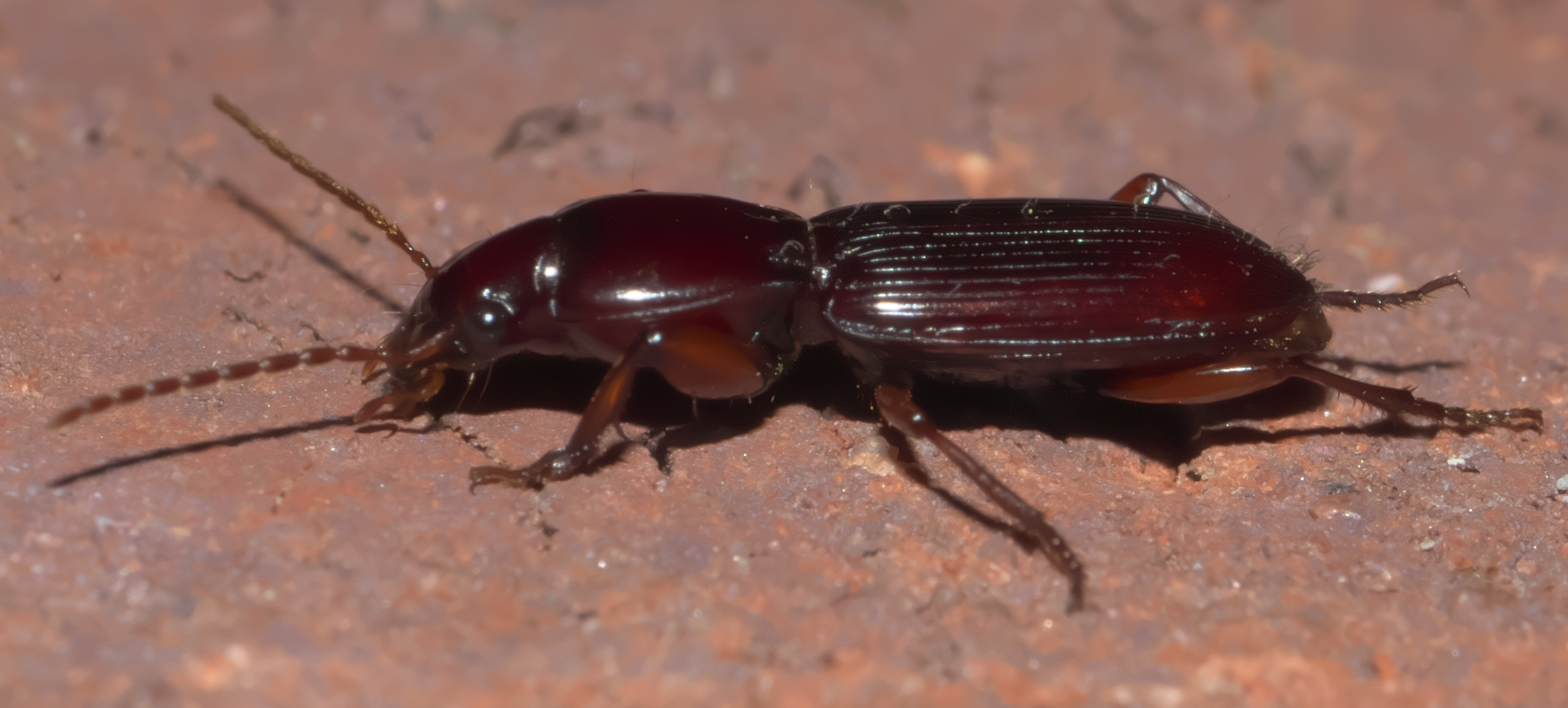
- Stenomorphus californicus

Scientific classification
- Kingdom: Animalia
- Phylum: Arthropoda
- Class: Insecta
- Order: Coleoptera
- Suborder: Adephaga
- Family: Carabidae
- Tribe: Harpalini
- Subtribe: Harpalina
- Genus: Stenomorphus; Dejean, 1831

= Stenomorphus =

Genus of beetles

Stenomorphus is a genus of beetles in the family Carabidae, containing the following species:

- Stenomorphus angustatus Dejean, 1831
- Stenomorphus californicus (Menetries, 1843)
- Stenomorphus convexior Notman, 1922
- Stenomorphus cubanus Darlington, 1937
- Stenomorphus penicillatus Darlington, 1936
- Stenomorphus sinaloae Darlington, 1936
