= Stenomorphus sinaloae =

Scientific classification
- Domain: Eukaryota
- Kingdom: Animalia
- Phylum: Arthropoda
- Class: Insecta
- Order: Coleoptera
- Suborder: Adephaga
- Family: Carabidae
- Subfamily: Harpalinae
- Tribe: Harpalini
- Subtribe: Harpalina
- Genus: Stenomorphus
- Species: S. sinaloae

Binomial name
- Stenomorphus sinaloae Darlington, 1936

Species of beetle

Stenomorphus sinaloae is a species of ground beetle in the family Carabidae. It is found in North America.
