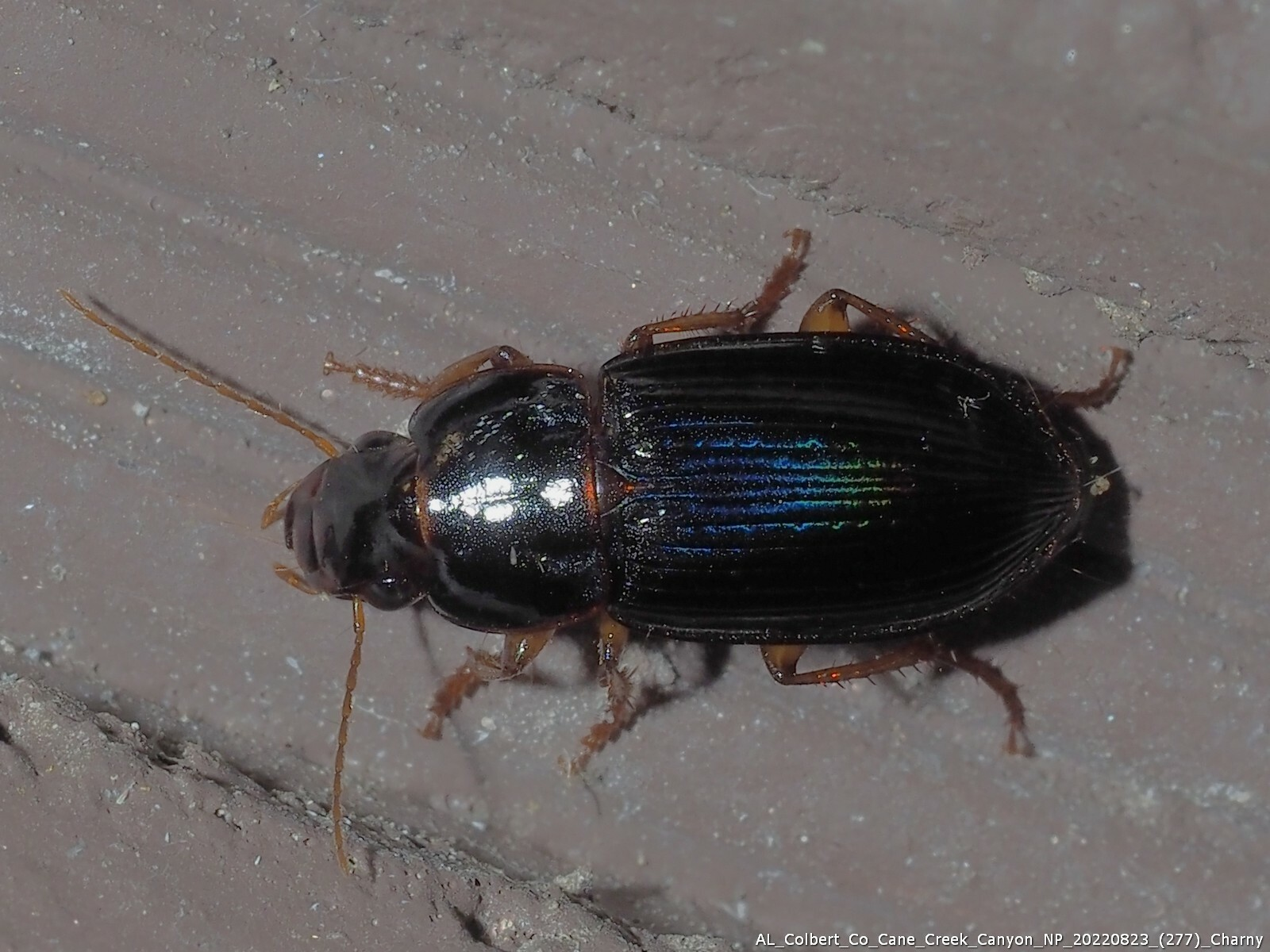

Scientific classification
- Domain: Eukaryota
- Kingdom: Animalia
- Phylum: Arthropoda
- Class: Insecta
- Order: Coleoptera
- Suborder: Adephaga
- Family: Carabidae
- Subfamily: Harpalinae
- Tribe: Harpalini
- Genus: Amblygnathus
- Species: A. mexicanus

Binomial name
- Amblygnathus mexicanus Bates, 1882

Synonyms
- Amblygnathus delumbis (Casey, 1914)

= Amblygnathus mexicanus =

Species of beetle

Amblygnathus mexicanus is a species of ground beetle in the family Carabidae. It is found in North America.
