= Amblygnathus =

Scientific classification
- Kingdom: Animalia
- Phylum: Arthropoda
- Class: Insecta
- Order: Coleoptera
- Suborder: Adephaga
- Family: Carabidae
- Subfamily: Harpalinae
- Tribe: Harpalini
- Subtribe: Harpalina
- Genus: Amblygnathus; Dejean, 1829

Genus of beetles

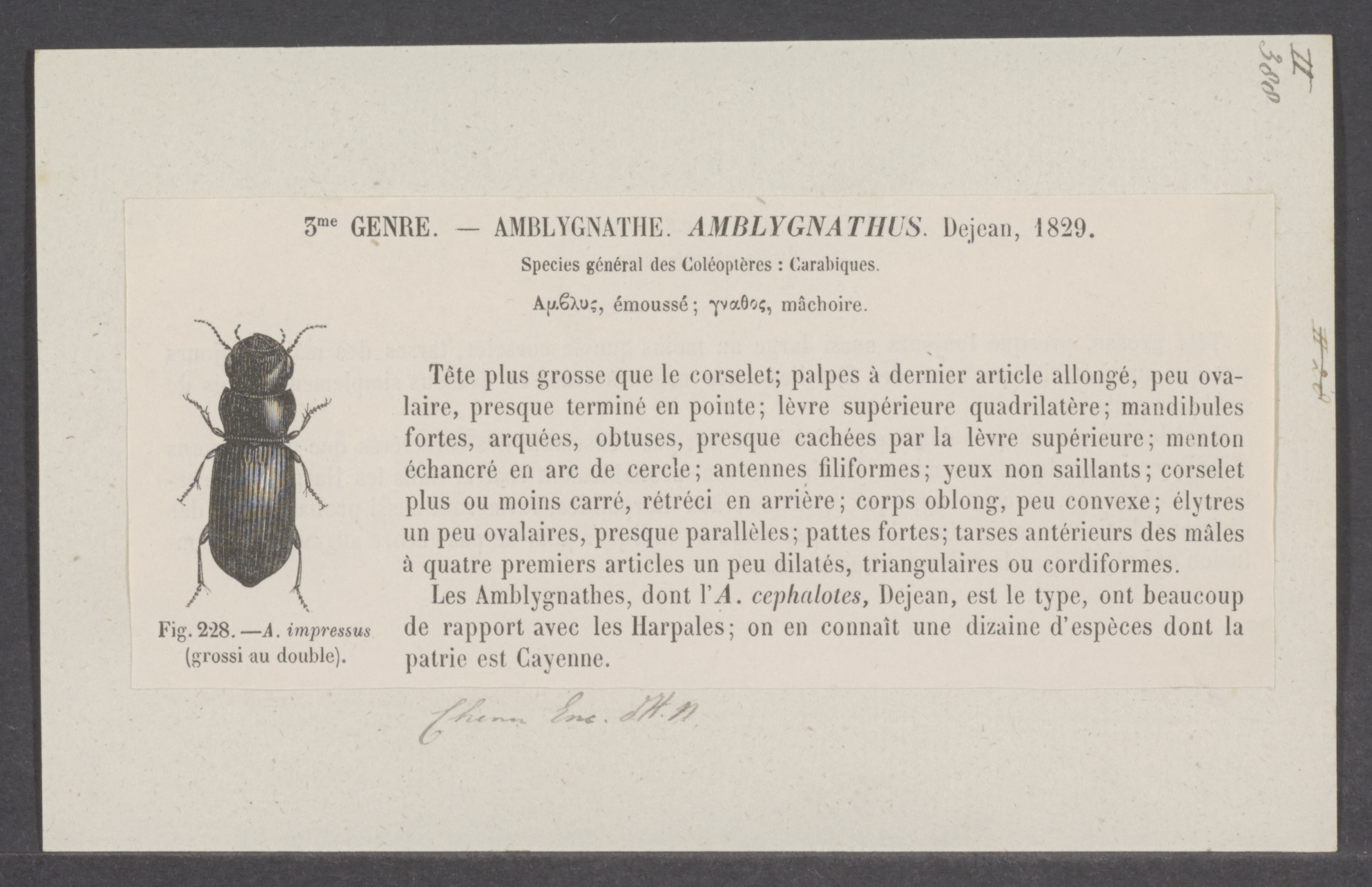
Amblygnathus.

Amblygnathus is a genus in the beetle family Carabidae. There are more than 20 described species in Amblygnathus.

== Species ==
These 25 species belong to the genus Amblygnathus:

- Amblygnathus bicolor Ball & Maddison, 1987 (South America)
- Amblygnathus braziliensis Ball & Maddison, 1987 (Brazil)
- Amblygnathus cephalotes Dejean, 1829 (Central and South America)
- Amblygnathus corvinus Dejean, 1829 (Bolivia, Surinam, French Guiana, Brazil)
- Amblygnathus darlingtoni Ball & Maddison, 1987 (Central and South America)
- Amblygnathus evansi Ball & Maddison, 1987 (United States, El Salvador, Mexico)
- Amblygnathus fricki Ball & Maddison, 1987 (Panama)
- Amblygnathus geminatus Ball & Maddison, 1987 (Surinam)
- Amblygnathus georgei Shpeley, 2008 (Chile, Paraguay, Peru)
- Amblygnathus gigas Ball & Maddison, 1987 (Brazil)
- Amblygnathus gilvipes Ball & Maddison, 1987 (Central and South America)
- Amblygnathus interior Ball & Maddison, 1987 (Mexico)
- Amblygnathus iripennis (Say, 1823) (United States)
- Amblygnathus janthinus Dejean, 1829 (Central and South America)
- Amblygnathus lucidus Dejean, 1829 (South America)
- Amblygnathus mexicanus Bates, 1882 (United States, Panama, and Mexico)
- Amblygnathus panamensis Ball & Maddison, 1987 (Panama)
- Amblygnathus puncticollis (Putzeys, 1878) (the Lesser Antilles, Hispaniola, and Cuba)
- Amblygnathus reichardti Ball & Maddison, 1987 (Bolivia and Brazil)
- Amblygnathus subtinctus (LeConte, 1867) (United States and Mexico)
- Amblygnathus suturalis Putzeys, 1845 (Central and South America)
- Amblygnathus tikal Ball & Maddison, 1987 (Guatemala and Mexico)
- Amblygnathus whiteheadi Ball & Maddison, 1987 (Mexico)
- Amblygnathus woodruffi Ball & Maddison, 1987 (Central and South America)
- Amblygnathus xingu Ball & Maddison, 1987 (Brazil)
