= Amblygnathus subtinctus =

Scientific classification
- Domain: Eukaryota
- Kingdom: Animalia
- Phylum: Arthropoda
- Class: Insecta
- Order: Coleoptera
- Suborder: Adephaga
- Family: Carabidae
- Subfamily: Harpalinae
- Tribe: Harpalini
- Genus: Amblygnathus
- Species: A. subtinctus

Binomial name
- Amblygnathus subtinctus (LeConte, 1867)

Synonyms
- Amblygnathus angulatus (Casey, 1914)

Species of beetle

Amblygnathus subtinctus is a species of ground beetle in the family Carabidae. It is found in North America.
