= Bradybaenus festivus =

Scientific classification
- Kingdom: Animalia
- Phylum: Arthropoda
- Class: Insecta
- Order: Coleoptera
- Suborder: Adephaga
- Family: Carabidae
- Tribe: Harpalini
- Genus: Bradybaenus
- Species: B. festivus

Binomial name
- Bradybaenus festivus Dejean, 1829

Synonyms
- Calodromus exornatus Nietner, 1858; Bradybaenus exornatus (Nietner, 1858); Bradybaenus ornatus L. Redtenbacher, 1867

Species of beetle

Bradybaenus festivus is a species of ground beetle in the family Carabidae. It is found in India and Sri Lanka.
