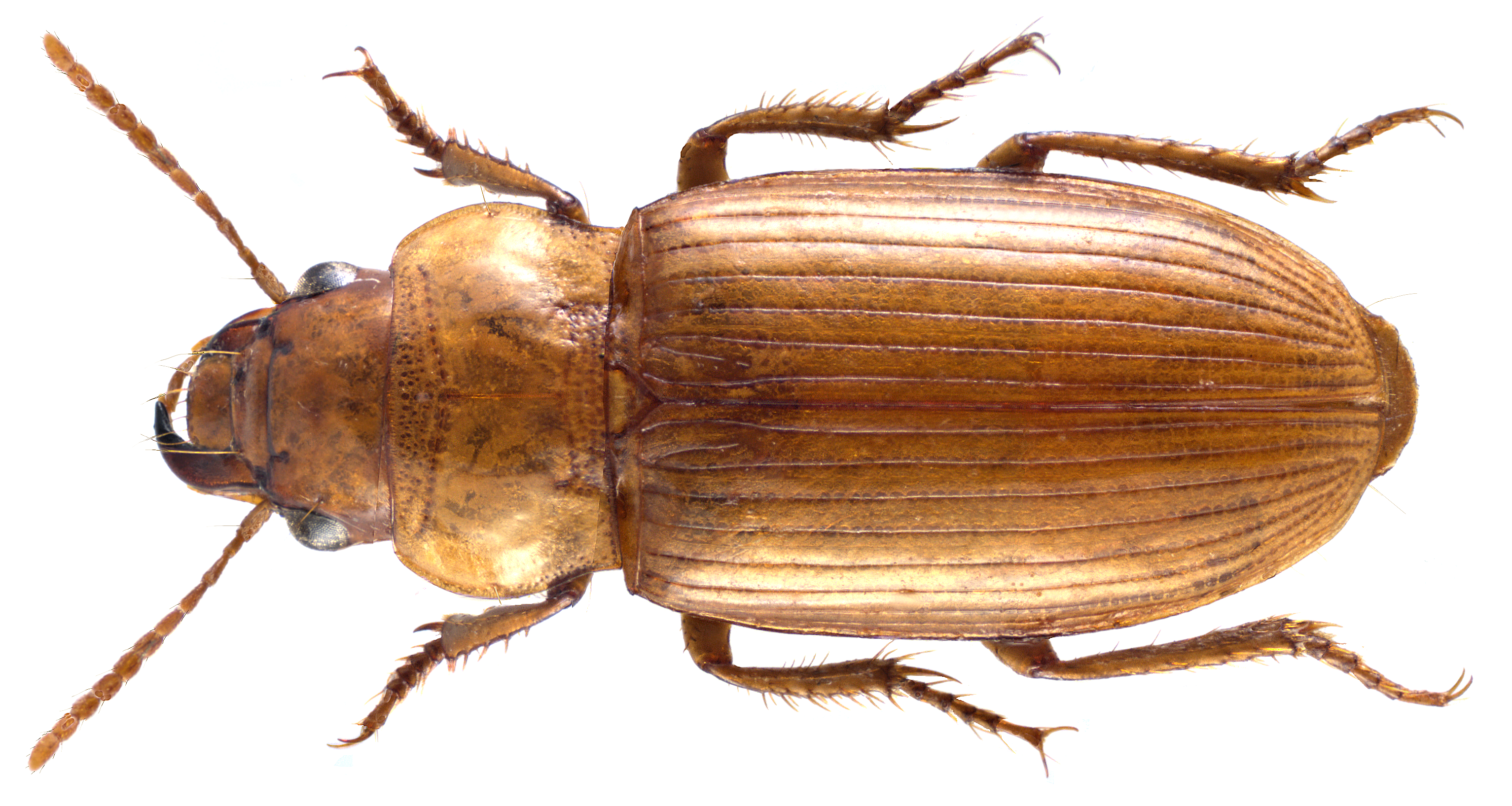
- Bradybaenus cephalotes

Scientific classification
- Kingdom: Animalia
- Phylum: Arthropoda
- Class: Insecta
- Order: Coleoptera
- Suborder: Adephaga
- Family: Carabidae
- Subfamily: Harpalinae
- Tribe: Harpalini
- Subtribe: Harpalina
- Genus: Bradybaenus; Dejean, 1829

= Bradybaenus =

Genus of beetles

Bradybaenus is a genus in the beetle family Carabidae. There are about 16 described species in Bradybaenus.

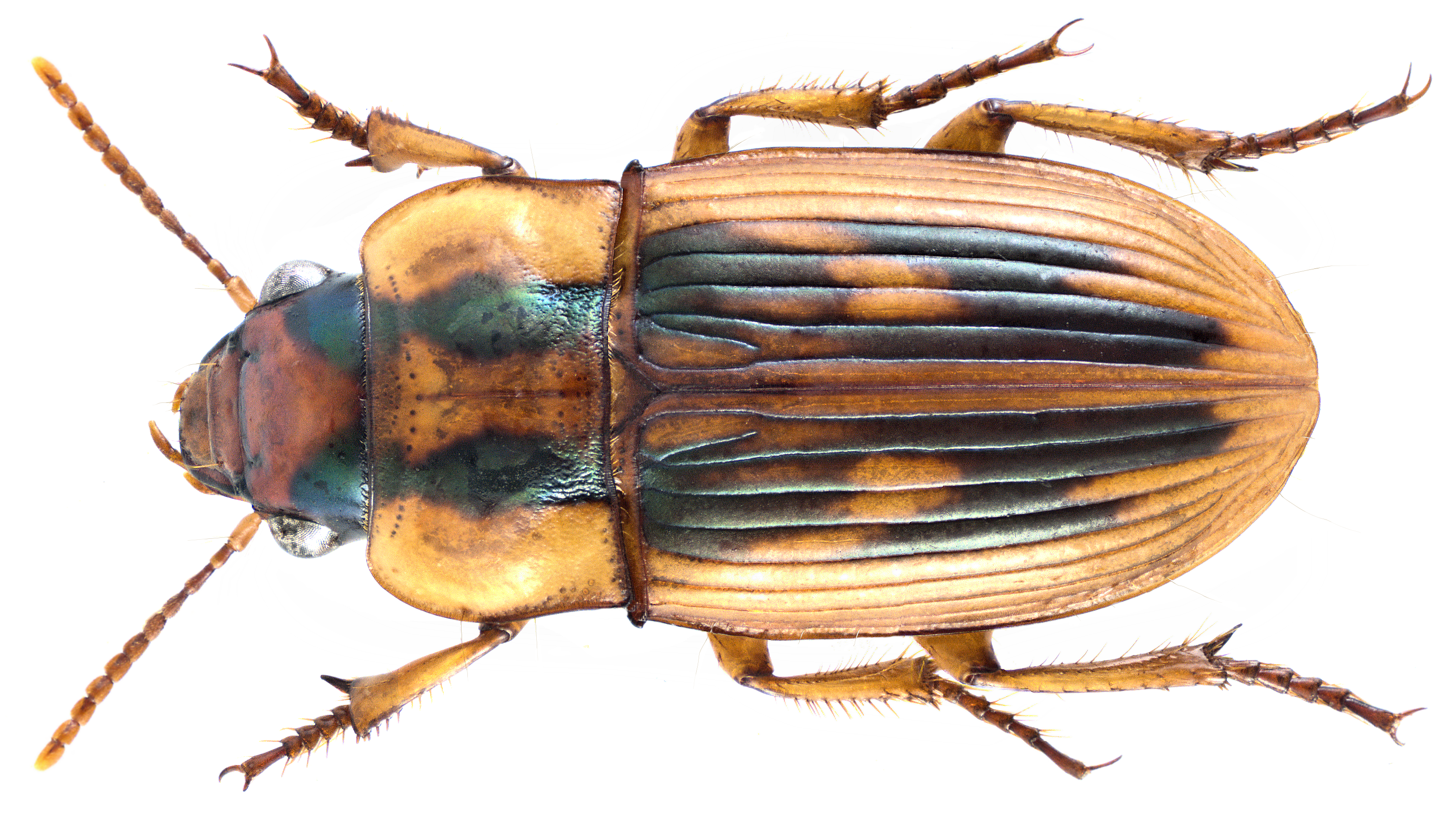
Bradybaenus scalaris

== Species ==
These 16 species belong to the genus Bradybaenus:

- Bradybaenus cephalotes Basilewsky, 1946 (Namibia and South Africa)
- Bradybaenus czeppeli Facchini & Sciaky, 2004 (Botswana and Namibia)
- Bradybaenus exiguus Facchini, 2011 (Zambia, Mozambique, and South Africa)
- Bradybaenus festivus Dejean, 1829 (Sri Lanka and India)
- Bradybaenus halli Basilewsky, 1946 (Somalia and Kenya)
- Bradybaenus neavei Basilewsky, 1946 (Malawi, Mozambique, Zimbabwe, and South Africa)
- Bradybaenus obscurus Basilewsky, 1984 (Tanzania)
- Bradybaenus opulentus Boheman, 1848 (Africa)
- Bradybaenus oxyomus Chaudoir, 1843 (Africa)
- Bradybaenus periphanus Basilewsky, 1951 (Tanzania)
- Bradybaenus perrieri Jeannel, 1948 (Madagascar)
- Bradybaenus plumbeus Basilewsky, 1948 (Angola and Zambia)
- Bradybaenus puncticollis Burgeon, 1936 (Congo (Brazzaville) and Democratic Republic of the Congo)
- Bradybaenus robustus Facchini & Sciaky, 2004 (Chad)
- Bradybaenus scalaris (Olivier, 1808) (Africa)
- Bradybaenus sellatus Dejean, 1831 (Africa)
