= Discoderus impotens =

Scientific classification
- Domain: Eukaryota
- Kingdom: Animalia
- Phylum: Arthropoda
- Class: Insecta
- Order: Coleoptera
- Suborder: Adephaga
- Family: Carabidae
- Subfamily: Harpalinae
- Tribe: Harpalini
- Subtribe: Harpalina
- Genus: Discoderus
- Species: D. impotens

Binomial name
- Discoderus impotens (LeConte, 1858)

Species of beetle

Discoderus impotens is a species of ground beetle in the family Carabidae. It is found in North America.
