= Discoderus aequalis =

Scientific classification
- Domain: Eukaryota
- Kingdom: Animalia
- Phylum: Arthropoda
- Class: Insecta
- Order: Coleoptera
- Suborder: Adephaga
- Family: Carabidae
- Subfamily: Harpalinae
- Tribe: Harpalini
- Subtribe: Harpalina
- Genus: Discoderus
- Species: D. aequalis

Binomial name
- Discoderus aequalis Casey, 1914

Species of beetle

Discoderus aequalis is a species of ground beetle in the family Carabidae. It is found in North America.
