= Discoderus amoenus =

Scientific classification
- Domain: Eukaryota
- Kingdom: Animalia
- Phylum: Arthropoda
- Class: Insecta
- Order: Coleoptera
- Suborder: Adephaga
- Family: Carabidae
- Subfamily: Harpalinae
- Tribe: Harpalini
- Genus: Discoderus
- Species: D. amoenus

Binomial name
- Discoderus amoenus LeConte, 1863

Species of beetle

Discoderus amoenus is a species of beetle in the family Carabidae. It is endemic to the United States.
