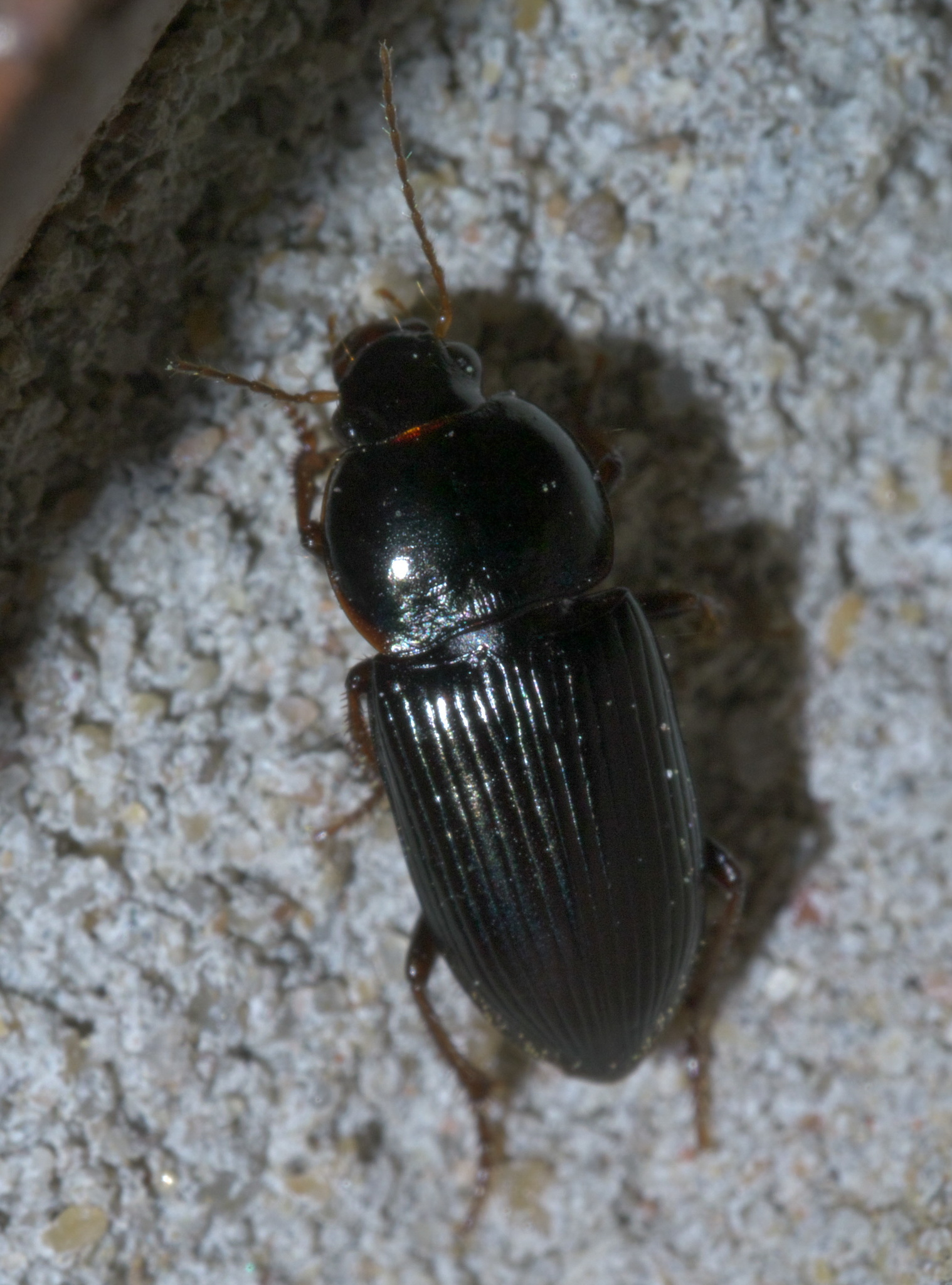
- Discoderus parallelus, Oklahoma

Scientific classification
- Kingdom: Animalia
- Phylum: Arthropoda
- Class: Insecta
- Order: Coleoptera
- Suborder: Adephaga
- Family: Carabidae
- Subfamily: Harpalinae
- Tribe: Harpalini
- Subtribe: Harpalina
- Genus: Discoderus; LeConte, 1853

= Discoderus =

Genus of beetles

Discoderus is a genus in the beetle family Carabidae. There are more than 30 described species in Discoderus.

== Species ==
These 33 species belong to the genus Discoderus:

- Discoderus acinopoides Bates, 1884 (Mexico)
- Discoderus aequalis Casey, 1914 (United States)
- Discoderus amoenus LeConte, 1863 (United States)
- Discoderus arcuatus (Putzeys, 1878) (Mexico)
- Discoderus beauvoisii (Dejean, 1829) (Lesser Antilles, Cuba, Bahamas)
- Discoderus cinctus (Putzeys, 1878) (Cuba)
- Discoderus congruens Casey, 1914 (United States)
- Discoderus cordicollis G.Horn, 1891 (United States)
- Discoderus crassicollis G.Horn, 1891 (United States)
- Discoderus crassiusculus (Putzeys, 1878) (Mexico)
- Discoderus cyaneopacus (Darlington, 1934) (Hispaniola)
- Discoderus dallasensis Casey, 1924 (United States)
- Discoderus difformipes Bates, 1882 (Mexico)
- Discoderus discoderoides (Schaeffer, 1910) (United States)
- Discoderus dislocatus Bates, 1891 (Mexico)
- Discoderus distortus Bates, 1882 (Mexico)
- Discoderus impotens (LeConte, 1858) (United States and Mexico)
- Discoderus longicollis Casey, 1914 (United States)
- Discoderus melanthus Bates, 1884 (Mexico)
- Discoderus obsidianus Casey, 1914 (United States)
- Discoderus papagonis Casey, 1924 (United States)
- Discoderus parallelus (Haldeman, 1843) (United States and Canada)
- Discoderus parilis (Casey, 1914) (United States)
- Discoderus peregrinus Casey, 1924 (United States)
- Discoderus piger Bates, 1882 (Mexico)
- Discoderus pinguis Casey, 1884 (United States)
- Discoderus pulvinatus Bates, 1884 (Mexico)
- Discoderus robustus G.Horn, 1883 (United States)
- Discoderus subviolaceus Casey, 1914 (United States)
- Discoderus symbolicus Casey, 1914 (United States)
- Discoderus tenebrosus (LeConte, 1847) (United States)
- Discoderus texanus Casey, 1924 (United States)
- Discoderus thoracicus (Putzeys, 1878) (Hispaniola)
