= Discoderus parallelus =

Scientific classification
- Kingdom: Animalia
- Phylum: Arthropoda
- Class: Insecta
- Order: Coleoptera
- Suborder: Adephaga
- Family: Carabidae
- Genus: Discoderus
- Species: D. parallelus

Binomial name
- Discoderus parallelus (Haldeman, 1843)

Species of beetle

Discoderus parallelus is a ground beetle in the family Carabidae ("ground beetles"), in the suborder Adephaga ("ground and water beetles"). Discoderus parallelus is found in North America.
