= Discoderus cordicollis =

Scientific classification
- Domain: Eukaryota
- Kingdom: Animalia
- Phylum: Arthropoda
- Class: Insecta
- Order: Coleoptera
- Suborder: Adephaga
- Family: Carabidae
- Subfamily: Harpalinae
- Tribe: Harpalini
- Subtribe: Harpalina
- Genus: Discoderus
- Species: D. cordicollis

Binomial name
- Discoderus cordicollis G. Horn, 1891

Species of beetle

Discoderus cordicollis is a species of ground beetle in the family Carabidae. It is found in North America.
