= Discoderus robustus =

Scientific classification
- Domain: Eukaryota
- Kingdom: Animalia
- Phylum: Arthropoda
- Class: Insecta
- Order: Coleoptera
- Suborder: Adephaga
- Family: Carabidae
- Subfamily: Harpalinae
- Tribe: Harpalini
- Subtribe: Harpalina
- Genus: Discoderus
- Species: D. robustus

Binomial name
- Discoderus robustus G. Horn, 1883

Species of beetle

Discoderus robustus is a species of ground beetle in the family Carabidae. It is found in North America.

== Subspecies ==
These two subspecies belong to the species Discoderus robustus:

- Discoderus robustus piceus Casey, 1914
- Discoderus robustus robustus G. Horn, 1883
