= Coleolissus perlucens =

Scientific classification
- Kingdom: Animalia
- Phylum: Arthropoda
- Class: Insecta
- Order: Coleoptera
- Suborder: Adephaga
- Family: Carabidae
- Subfamily: Harpalinae
- Tribe: Harpalini
- Genus: Coleolissus
- Species: C. perlucens

Binomial name
- Coleolissus perlucens (Bates, 1878)

Synonyms
- Harpalus perlucens

Species of beetle

Coleolissus perlucens is a species in the beetle family Carabidae. It is found in Pakistan and India.
