= Coleolissus =

Scientific classification
- Domain: Eukaryota
- Kingdom: Animalia
- Phylum: Arthropoda
- Class: Insecta
- Order: Coleoptera
- Suborder: Adephaga
- Family: Carabidae
- Subfamily: Harpalinae
- Tribe: Harpalini
- Genus: Coleolissus; Henry Bates, 1892

Subgenera
- Coleolissus Bates, 1892; Tenuistilus Habu, 1978

Genus of beetles

Coleolissus is a genus in the beetle family Carabidae. There are more than 50 described species in Coleolissus, found in Asia.

== Species ==
These 51 species belong to the genus Coleolissus:

- Coleolissus angulatus Darlington, 1968 (Indonesia and New Guinea)
- Coleolissus azumai Habu, 1973 (Japan)
- Coleolissus biakensis Baehr, 2018 (Indonesia and New Guinea)
- Coleolissus bicoloripes (Bates, 1892) (China, Myanmar, Indonesia, Borneo)
- Coleolissus buruensis Habu, 1973 (Indonesia)
- Coleolissus cupripennis N.Ito, 2014 (Indonesia)
- Coleolissus cyanescens N.Ito, 1993 (Malaysia, Indonesia, Borneo)
- Coleolissus debilopunctatus N.Ito, 2006 (Laos)
- Coleolissus doisaketensis N.Ito, 2008 (Thailand)
- Coleolissus elongatus N.Ito, 1991 (Thailand)
- Coleolissus eulamprus (Bates, 1892) (Myanmar)
- Coleolissus formosanus N.Ito, 1993 (Taiwan)
- Coleolissus fulvomarginatus N.Ito, 2017 (Indonesia)
- Coleolissus impunctatus N.Ito, 2014 (Malaysia, Indonesia, Borneo)
- Coleolissus iridipennis N.Ito, 1999 (Laos)
- Coleolissus iris Andrewes, 1924 (Pakistan, Nepal, Sri Lanka, India)
- Coleolissus kalisi Louwerens, 1952 (Indonesia)
- Coleolissus katoi N.Ito, 2001 (Philippines)
- Coleolissus kimanisensis N.Ito, 2014 (Malaysia, Indonesia, Borneo)
- Coleolissus kiyoyamai N.Ito, 1987 (Malaysia)
- Coleolissus lamprotus (Bates, 1892) (Myanmar)
- Coleolissus latemarginatus N.Ito, 2004 (Laos)
- Coleolissus leveri Emden, 1937 (Indonesia and the Solomon Islands)
- Coleolissus martini N.Ito, 2014 (Indonesia)
- Coleolissus masumotoi N.Ito, 1991 (Thailand)
- Coleolissus missai Baehr, 2018 (New Guinea and Papua)
- Coleolissus nakajimai N.Ito, 2016 (India)
- Coleolissus nigricans N.Ito, 1987 (Malaysia)
- Coleolissus nigridorsis N.Ito, 2014 (Indonesia)
- Coleolissus nigrocupreus N.Ito & Liang, 2018 (Laos)
- Coleolissus niisatoi N.Ito, 2017 (Indonesia)
- Coleolissus nitens Andrewes, 1933 (Indonesia)
- Coleolissus nitidus N.Ito, 1991 (Thailand)
- Coleolissus noeli Andrewes, 1930 (India)
- Coleolissus novaeirlandicus Baehr, 2018 (New Guinea)
- Coleolissus ohkurai N.Ito, 1993 (Malaysia, Indonesia, Borneo)
- Coleolissus ohtanii N.Ito & Liang, 2018 (Laos)
- Coleolissus papua Darlington, 1968 (Indonesia, New Guinea, Australia)
- Coleolissus perlucens (Bates, 1878) (Pakistan and India)
- Coleolissus philippinus N.Ito, 2001 (Philippines)
- Coleolissus puncticollis N.Ito, 2008 (Laos)
- Coleolissus satoi N.Ito, 2007 (Vietnam)
- Coleolissus shibatai N.Ito, 1987 (Taiwan)
- Coleolissus similis N.Ito, 1993 (Malaysia, Indonesia, Borneo)
- Coleolissus splendens (N.Ito, 1997) (Sri Lanka and India)
- Coleolissus subcastaneus N.Ito, 2008 (Indonesia and Borneo)
- Coleolissus teradai (Habu, 1978) (Taiwan)
- Coleolissus turturensis N.Ito, 2016 (Nepal)
- Coleolissus viridellus (Bates, 1892) (Nepal and Myanmar)
- Coleolissus yamasakoi N.Ito & Liang, 2018 (Indonesia)
- Coleolissus yunnanus N.Ito & Wrase, 2000 (China)
