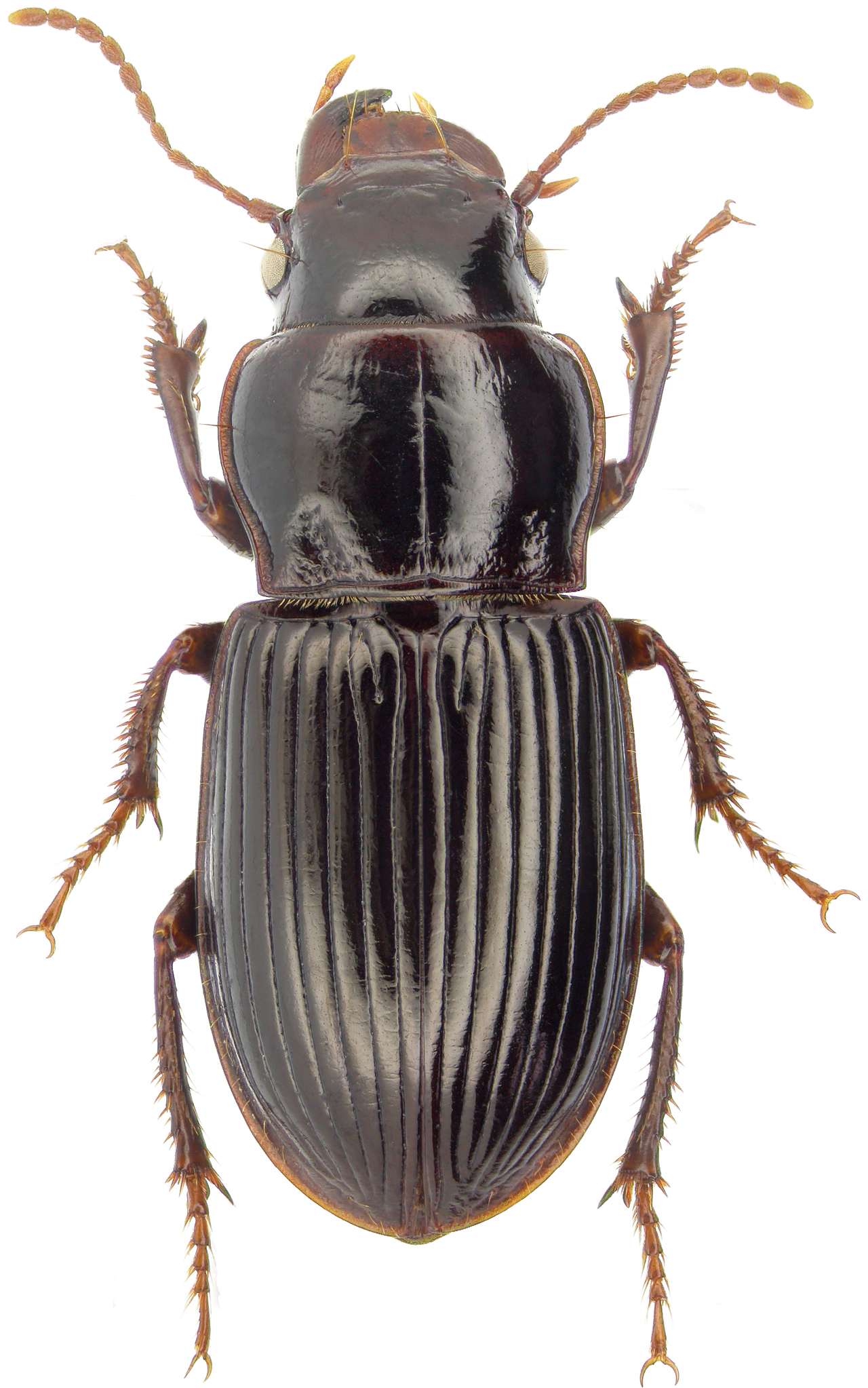

Scientific classification
- Kingdom: Animalia
- Phylum: Arthropoda
- Class: Insecta
- Order: Coleoptera
- Suborder: Adephaga
- Family: Carabidae
- Subfamily: Harpalinae
- Genus: Cratacanthus; Dejean, 1829
- Species: C. dubius

Binomial name
- Cratacanthus dubius Palisot de Beauvoi, 1811

= Cratacanthus =

Cratacanthus dubius

Species of beetle

Cratacanthus dubius is a species of beetle in the family Carabidae, the only species in the genus Cratacanthus.
