= Pseudohyparpalus =

Scientific classification
- Domain: Eukaryota
- Kingdom: Animalia
- Phylum: Arthropoda
- Class: Insecta
- Order: Coleoptera
- Suborder: Adephaga
- Family: Carabidae
- Subfamily: Harpalinae
- Tribe: Harpalini
- Subtribe: Harpalina
- Genus: Pseudohyparpalus; Basilewsky, 1946

Genus of beetles

Pseudohyparpalus is a genus in the beetle family Carabidae. There are more than 20 described species in Pseudohyparpalus, found mainly in Africa.

== Species ==
These 25 species belong to the genus Pseudohyparpalus:

- Pseudohyparpalus angustipennis (Putzeys in Chaudoir, 1876)
- Pseudohyparpalus audens (Péringuey, 1898)
- Pseudohyparpalus basilewskyi Lecordier, 1978
- Pseudohyparpalus bulirschi Facchini, 2004
- Pseudohyparpalus burgeoni Basilewsky, 1949
- Pseudohyparpalus casperi (Kuntzen, 1919)
- Pseudohyparpalus diastictus (Alluaud, 1927)
- Pseudohyparpalus elegans Clarke, 1981
- Pseudohyparpalus elongatus (Jeannel, 1948)
- Pseudohyparpalus fimbriatus Clarke, 1981
- Pseudohyparpalus hova (Alluaud, 1918)
- Pseudohyparpalus kolbei (Kuntzen, 1919)
- Pseudohyparpalus luluensis (Burgeon, 1936)
- Pseudohyparpalus metabolus (Alluaud, 1927)
- Pseudohyparpalus mossoensis Basilewsky, 1956
- Pseudohyparpalus nindae (Burgeon, 1937)
- Pseudohyparpalus nyassicus Clarke, 1981
- Pseudohyparpalus orientis Facchini, 2015
- Pseudohyparpalus puncticollis (Boheman, 1848)
- Pseudohyparpalus quadratus Clarke, 1981
- Pseudohyparpalus rectangularis Clarke, 1981
- Pseudohyparpalus tanzaniensis Facchini, 2015
- Pseudohyparpalus tenuissimus (Barker, 1922)
- Pseudohyparpalus velutinus (Dejean, 1829)
- Pseudohyparpalus zambiensis Facchini, 2015
