= Hartonymus hoodi =

Scientific classification
- Kingdom: Animalia
- Phylum: Arthropoda
- Class: Insecta
- Order: Coleoptera
- Suborder: Adephaga
- Family: Carabidae
- Tribe: Harpalini
- Subtribe: Harpalina
- Genus: Hartonymus
- Species: H. hoodi

Binomial name
- Hartonymus hoodi Casey, 1914

Species of beetle

Hartonymus hoodi is a species of ground beetle in the family Carabidae. It is found in North America.
