= Hartonymus alternatus =

Scientific classification
- Domain: Eukaryota
- Kingdom: Animalia
- Phylum: Arthropoda
- Class: Insecta
- Order: Coleoptera
- Suborder: Adephaga
- Family: Carabidae
- Subfamily: Harpalinae
- Tribe: Harpalini
- Genus: Hartonymus
- Species: H. alternatus

Binomial name
- Hartonymus alternatus (LeConte, 1863)

Species of beetle

Hartonymus alternatus is a species of ground beetle in the family Carabidae. It is found in North America.
