= Hartonymus =

Scientific classification
- Kingdom: Animalia
- Phylum: Arthropoda
- Class: Insecta
- Order: Coleoptera
- Suborder: Adephaga
- Family: Carabidae
- Subfamily: Harpalinae
- Tribe: Harpalini
- Subtribe: Harpalina
- Genus: Hartonymus; Casey, 1914

Genus of beetles

Hartonymus is a genus of carabids in the beetle family Carabidae. There are at least two described species in Hartonymus, found in the United States.

== Species ==
These two species belong to the genus Hartonymus:

- Hartonymus alternatus (LeConte, 1863)
- Hartonymus hoodi Casey, 1914
