= Geodromus becvari =

Scientific classification
- Domain: Eukaryota
- Kingdom: Animalia
- Phylum: Arthropoda
- Class: Insecta
- Order: Coleoptera
- Suborder: Adephaga
- Family: Carabidae
- Subfamily: Harpalinae
- Tribe: Harpalini
- Genus: Geodromus
- Species: G. becvari

Binomial name
- Geodromus becvari Kataev & Wrase, 2006

Species of beetle

Geodromus becvari is a species of ground beetle in the subfamily Harpalinae and genus Geodromus.
