= Geodromus dumolinii =

Scientific classification
- Kingdom: Animalia
- Phylum: Arthropoda
- Class: Insecta
- Order: Coleoptera
- Suborder: Adephaga
- Family: Carabidae
- Tribe: Harpalini
- Genus: Geodromus
- Species: G. dumolinii

Binomial name
- Geodromus dumolinii Dejean, 1829

Species of beetle

Geodromus dumolinii is a species of ground beetle in the subfamily Harpalinae and genus Geodromus.
