= Geodromus =

Scientific classification
- Kingdom: Animalia
- Phylum: Arthropoda
- Class: Insecta
- Order: Coleoptera
- Suborder: Adephaga
- Family: Carabidae
- Tribe: Harpalini
- Subtribe: Harpalina
- Genus: Geodromus; Dejean, 1829

Genus of beetles

Geodromus is a genus of beetles in the family Carabidae, containing the following species:

- Geodromus becvari Kataev & Wrase, 2006
- Geodromus dumolinii Dejean, 1829
