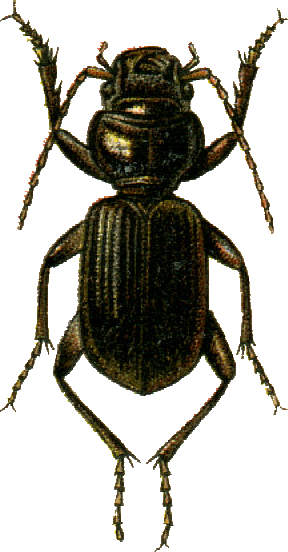
- Carenochyrus titanus

Scientific classification
- Domain: Eukaryota
- Kingdom: Animalia
- Phylum: Arthropoda
- Class: Insecta
- Order: Coleoptera
- Suborder: Adephaga
- Family: Carabidae
- Subfamily: Harpalinae
- Tribe: Harpalini
- Subtribe: Ditomina
- Genus: Carenochyrus; Solsky, 1874
- Species: C. titanus

Binomial name
- Carenochyrus titanus Solsky, 1874

Synonyms
- Carenochirus Reitter, 1900

= Carenochyrus =

Species of beetle

Carenochyrus is a genus in the ground beetle family Carabidae. This genus has a single species, Carenochyrus titanus. It is found in Iran, Kazakhstan, Uzbekistan, Turkmenistan, Kyrgyzstan, Tadzhikistan, and Afghanistan.
