= Pachycarus =

Scientific classification
- Domain: Eukaryota
- Kingdom: Animalia
- Phylum: Arthropoda
- Class: Insecta
- Order: Coleoptera
- Suborder: Adephaga
- Family: Carabidae
- Subfamily: Harpalinae
- Tribe: Harpalini
- Subtribe: Ditomina
- Genus: Pachycarus; Solier, 1835

Subgenera
- Mystropterus Chaudoir, 1842; Pachycarus Solier, 1835

Genus of beetles

Pachycarus is a genus in the beetle family Carabidae. There are about six described species in Pachycarus.

== Species ==
These six species belong to the genus Pachycarus:

- Pachycarus aculeatus Reiche & Saulcy, 1855 (Greece)
- Pachycarus artipunctatus (Dvorak, 1993) (Turkey)
- Pachycarus brevipennis Chaudoir, 1850 (Turkey and Iraq)
- Pachycarus coeruleus (Brullé, 1832) (Greece)
- Pachycarus cyaneus (Dejean, 1830) (North Macedonia, Greece, Bulgaria, and Turkey)
- Pachycarus latreillei Solier, 1835 (Turkey)
