= Harponixus =

Scientific classification
- Domain: Eukaryota
- Kingdom: Animalia
- Phylum: Arthropoda
- Class: Insecta
- Order: Coleoptera
- Suborder: Adephaga
- Family: Carabidae
- Subfamily: Harpalinae
- Tribe: Harpalini
- Subtribe: Harpalina
- Genus: Harponixus; Basilewsky, 1950
- Species: H. pubescens

Binomial name
- Harponixus pubescens Basilewsky, 1950

Species of beetle

Harponixus pubescens is a species of beetle in the family Carabidae, the only species in the genus Harponixus.
