= Harpalobrachys =

Scientific classification
- Kingdom: Animalia
- Phylum: Arthropoda
- Class: Insecta
- Order: Coleoptera
- Suborder: Adephaga
- Family: Carabidae
- Tribe: Harpalini
- Subtribe: Harpalina
- Genus: Harpalobrachys; Tschitschérine, 1899
- Species: H. leiroides

Binomial name
- Harpalobrachys leiroides (Motschulsky, 1844)

Species of beetle

Harpalobrachys leiroides is a species of ground beetle in the subfamily Harpalinae, the only species in the genus Harpalobrachys.
