= Aspidogaster limacoides =

Scientific classification
- Kingdom: Animalia
- Phylum: Platyhelminthes
- Class: Trematoda
- Order: Aspidogastrida
- Family: Aspidogastridae
- Genus: Aspidogaster
- Species: A. limacoides

Binomial name
- Aspidogaster limacoides Diesing, 1835

Synonyms
- Aspidogaster donicum Popoff, 1926

Species of fluke

Aspidogaster limacoides is a species of the trematodes in the family Aspidogastridae.

== Distribution ==
Distribution of Aspidogaster limacoides include:

- Austria - since 2001

== Hosts ==
Hosts of Aspidogaster limacoides include:

- Radix balthica
- Barbus barbus
