= Aspidogaster conchicola =

Scientific classification
- Kingdom: Animalia
- Phylum: Platyhelminthes
- Class: Trematoda
- Order: Aspidogastrida
- Family: Aspidogastridae
- Genus: Aspidogaster
- Species: A. conchicola

Binomial name
- Aspidogaster conchicola Baer, 1827

Synonyms
- Aspidogaster amurensis Achmerov, 1956

Species of fluke

Aspidogaster conchicola is a trematode parasite of the Aspidogastrea subclass that commonly infects freshwater clams. It has not been well studied since it is of little economic or medical importance, but A. conchicola and its fellow aspidogastreans are of significant biological importance since they may represent a step between free-living and parasitic organisms.

== Morphology ==
A. conchicola has a large ventral opisthaptor that extends most of its body's length, which is divided into sections called alveoli or loculi. It also possesses a longitudinal septum, a horizontal layer of muscle and connective tissue that separates the dorsal and ventral compartments of the body. The tegument is similar to that of other parasitic flatworms.

== Life cycle ==
Aspidogaster conchicola infects many species of freshwater bivalves belonging to several families, as well as freshwater snails, many species of freshwater fishes of several families, and freshwater tortoises.

Hosts include: Sinanodonta woodiana.
