= Imuta-ike =

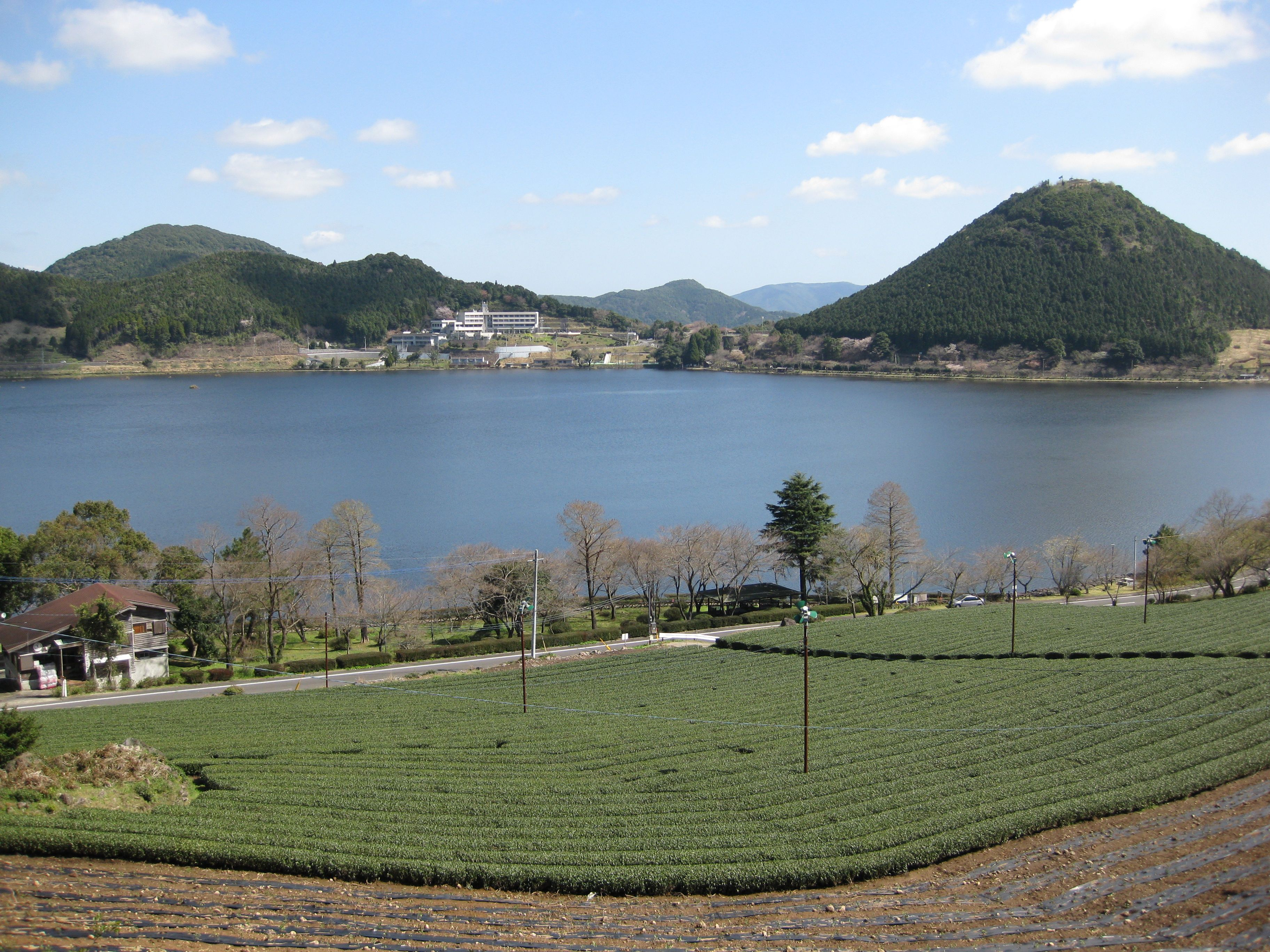
- Imuta-ike in Kagoshima Prefecture, a Ramsar Site

- Location within Japan
- Location: Kagoshima Prefecture
- Coordinates: 31°49′N 130°28′E
- Type: caldera lake
- Surface area: 0.63 square kilometres (63 ha)
- Max. depth: 2.7 metres (8.9 ft)
- Water volume: 0.0005 cubic kilometres (18,000,000 ft^{3})
- Surface elevation: 295 metres (968 ft)

Ramsar Wetland
- Designated: 8 November 2005
- Reference no.: 1544

Imuta-ike (藺牟田池) is a freshwater caldera lake in Satsumasendai, Kagoshima Prefecture, Japan. It forms part of Imutaike Prefectural Natural Park. Its plant communities were designated a Natural Monument of Japan in 1921 and sixty hectares of wetlands were designated a Ramsar Site in 2005.

== Geography ==
Imuta-ike is surrounded by mountains; Funamidake (498.8 metres (1,636 ft)), San-o-dake (491 metres (1,611 ft)), Katagi-yama (508.8 metres (1,669 ft)), Tōmigashiro (477 metres (1,565 ft)), Ī-moriyama (432 metres (1,417 ft), known due to its beauty also as Imuta-fuji), and there is no incoming large river. The outgoing water flows into Sendai River and Hiwagi River. Imuta-ike is in the last stage of the lake-pond formation cycle and is shrinking with the deposition of sediment. The colour of the pond is brown, 14 on the Forel-Ule scale, and its pH is 6.8; the water of the pond contains organic substances. There are many cherry trees around the pond. About one third of its area, to the northwest, is wetland; dotted by floating islands composed of peat. This is very rare in warm areas and the pond was designated a Natural Monument as the "peat forming vegetation of Imuta-ike" in 1921.

== Biota ==
On the surface of the pond, phragmites and wild rice grow thick and in the water, there are Brasenia, Nymphaea tetragona, water caltrop. As for fish, species include Zacco platypus (Oikawa (追河)), Black bass, Carassius langsdorfii and Oryzias latipes. A rare dragonfly, Libellula angelina is found, leading to the pond's selection as a Ramsar Site.

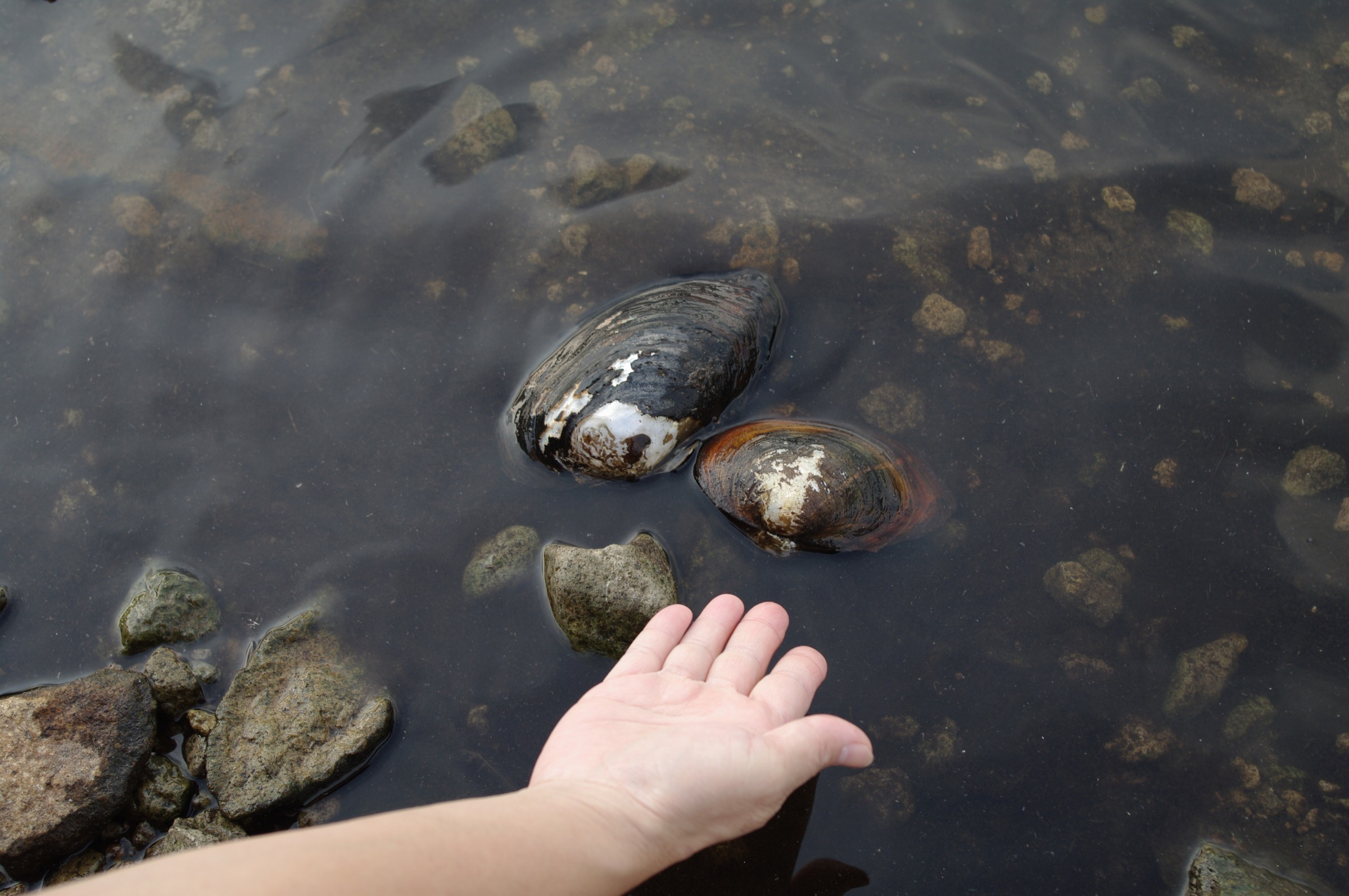
Sinanodonta woodiana in Imuta-ike

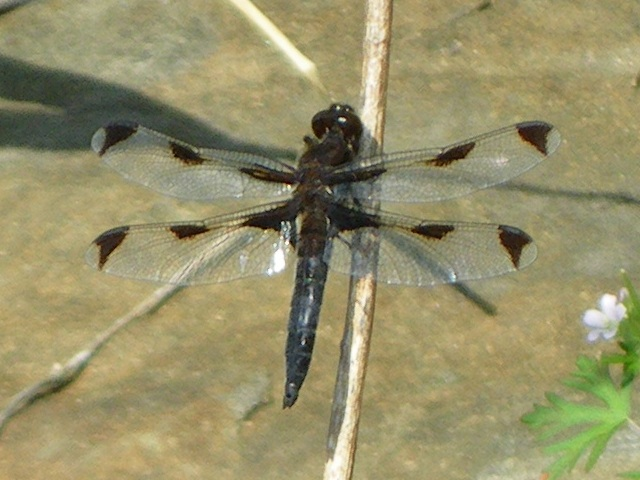
Libellula angelina

== History ==
Between 300,000 and 400,000 years ago, there were groups of lava domes, 4 km from east to west and 7 km from north to south. The centre of the domes was depressed forming a caldera. The lava dome formed Iimori-yama. The depression collected water and Imuta-ike was formed.

Prior to the Taishō era (1912–1926), Imuta-ike was known for the growth of common rushes (Juncus effusus), the raw material for tatami mats. In autumn, villagers used to cut and bundle rushes. Between 1741 and 1763, a 380-meter tunnel water lane was made at the eastern end of the pond, and 15 hectares of rice fields were made. In 1953, Imuta-ike was made a Prefectural Natural Park.

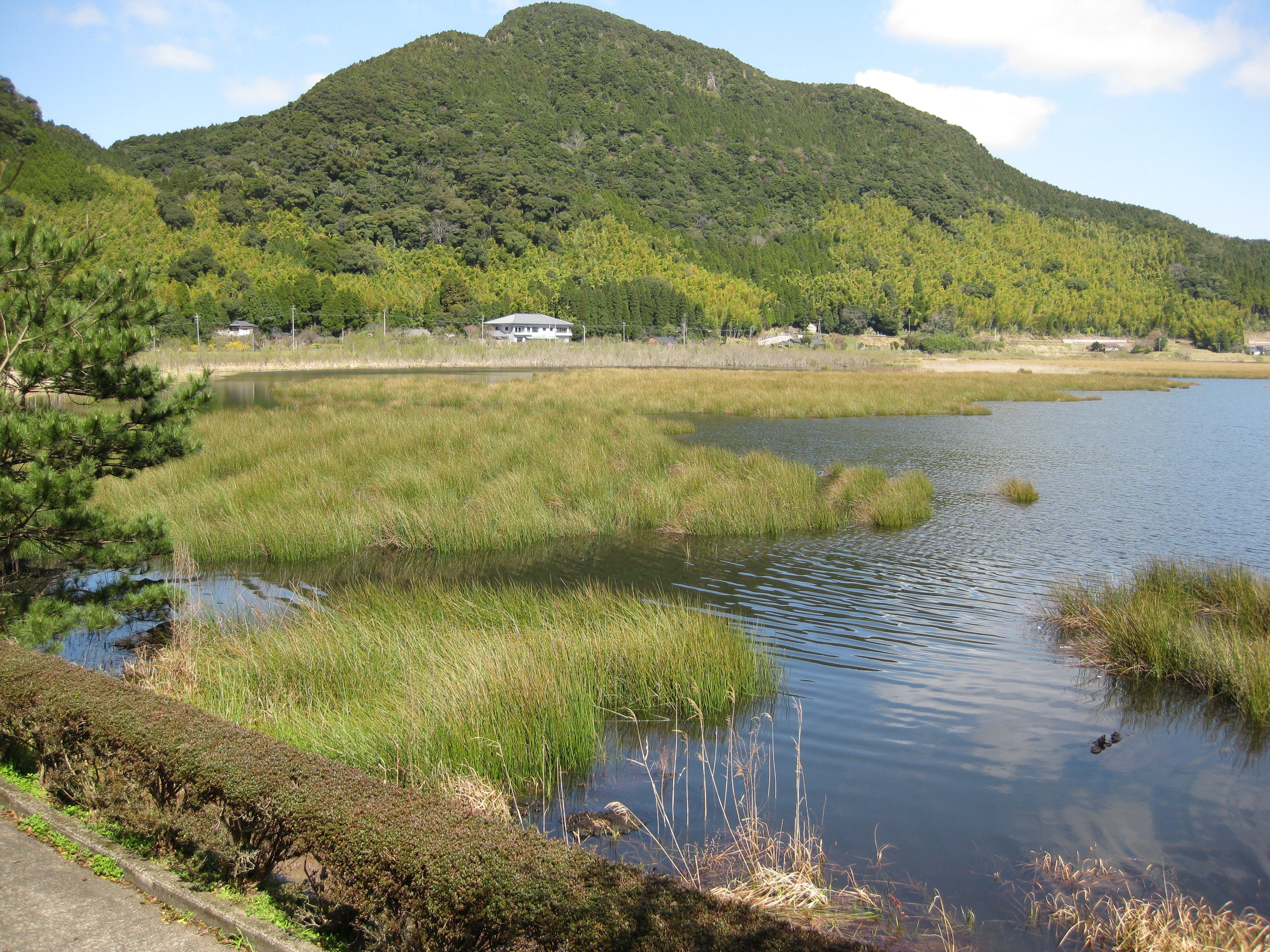
Peat forming vegetation

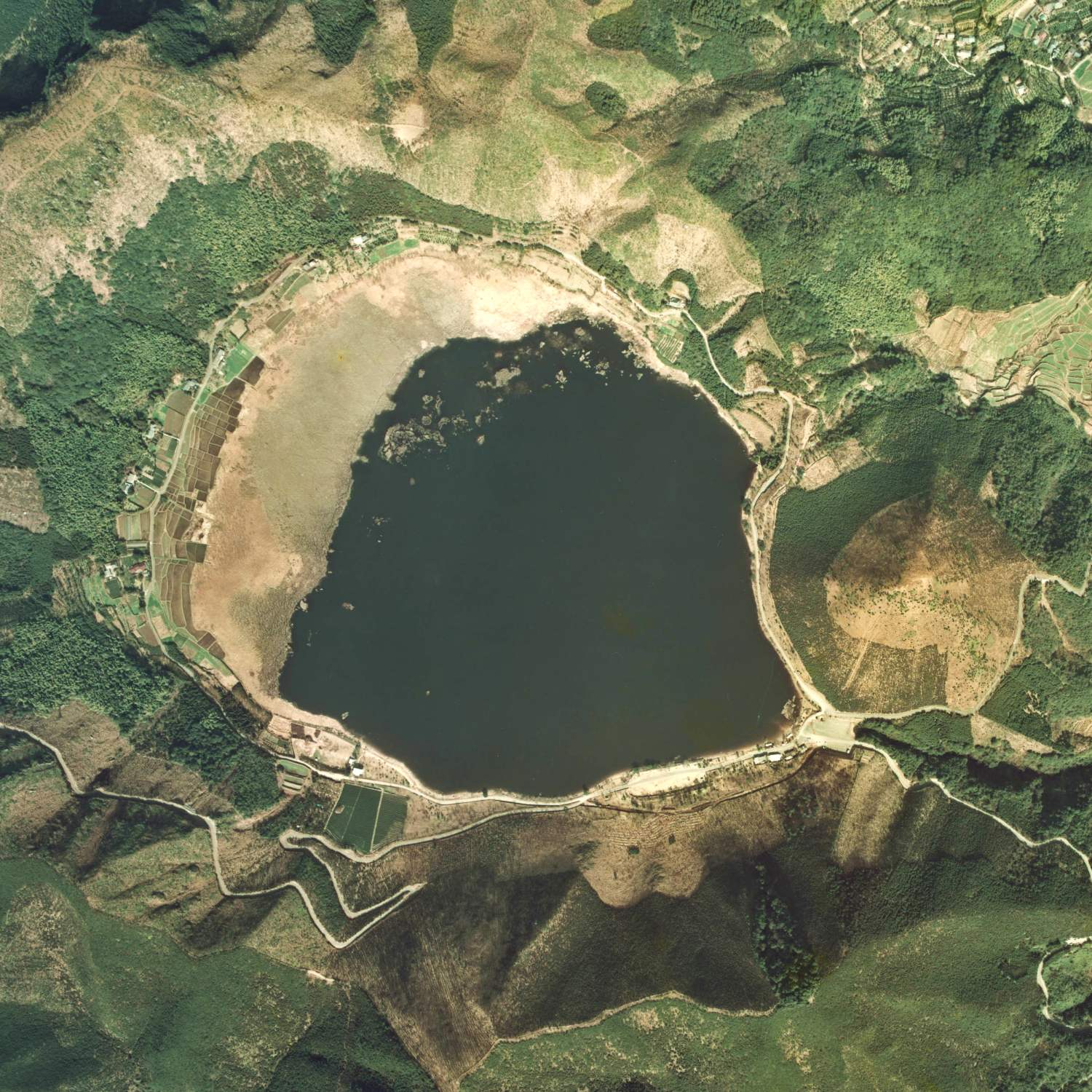
Aerial photograph, 1974

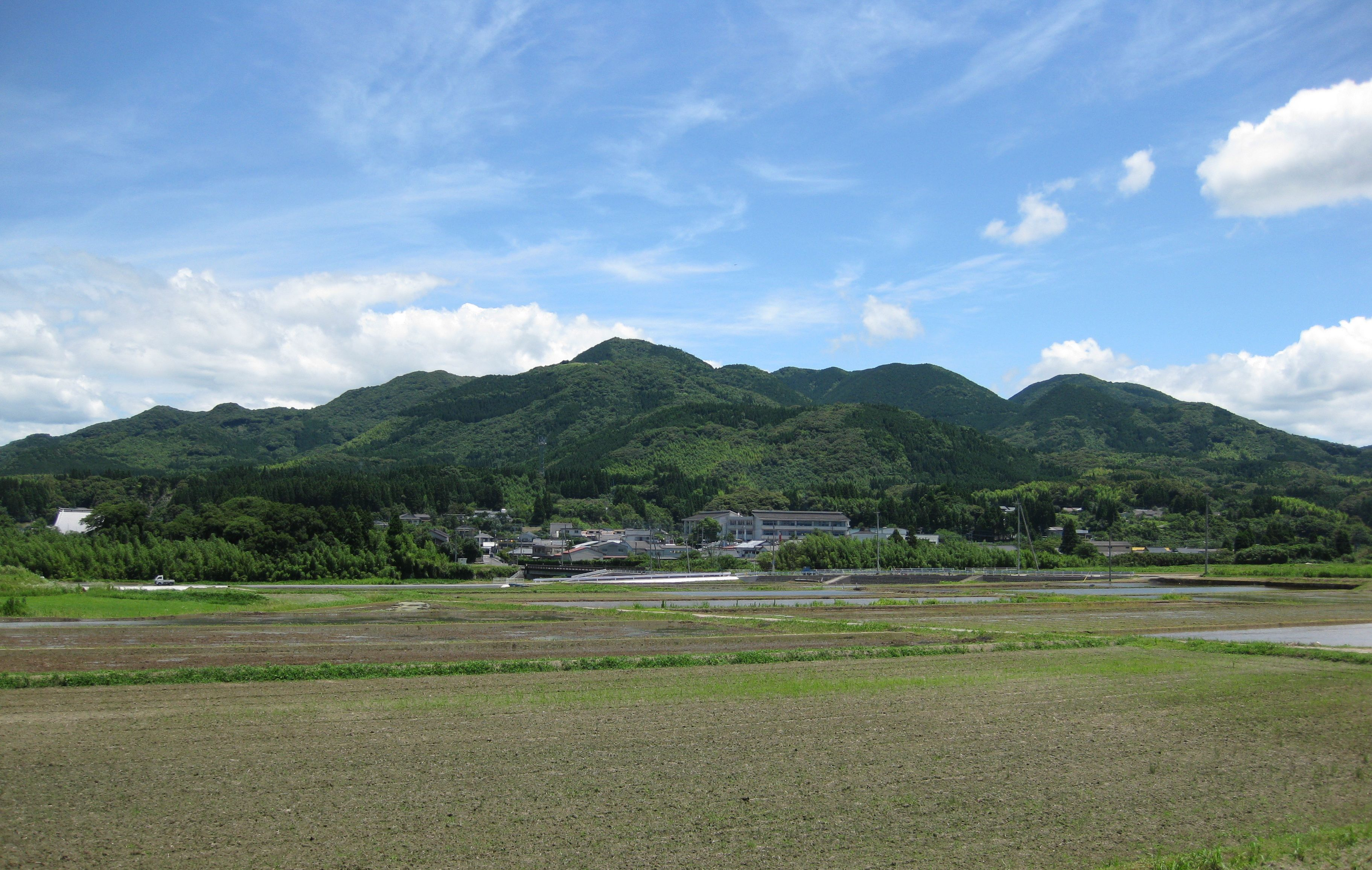
Imuta volcano

== See also ==
- List of Ramsar sites in Japan
- List of Special Places of Scenic Beauty, Special Historic Sites and Special Natural Monuments
