= Dockville Regatta =

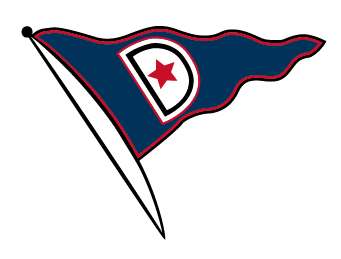
Official Burgee of the Dockville Regatta

Established in 2013, the Dockville Regatta is a sailing regatta held annually on the first Saturday of August in Mount Pleasant, South Carolina. Referred to by most as simply “Dockville”, the event is widely known for the raucous party that takes place on the pier-head. There has never been an actual race at the Dockville Regatta, making it the longest standing regatta with no participants. This peculiar phenomenon caused the Dockville Regatta to become known as “the race that never left the dock”. Experts attribute the perpetual lack of maritime competition to the fact that patrons are generally more concerned with socializing with their peers and consuming alcoholic beverages.

== History and origins ==
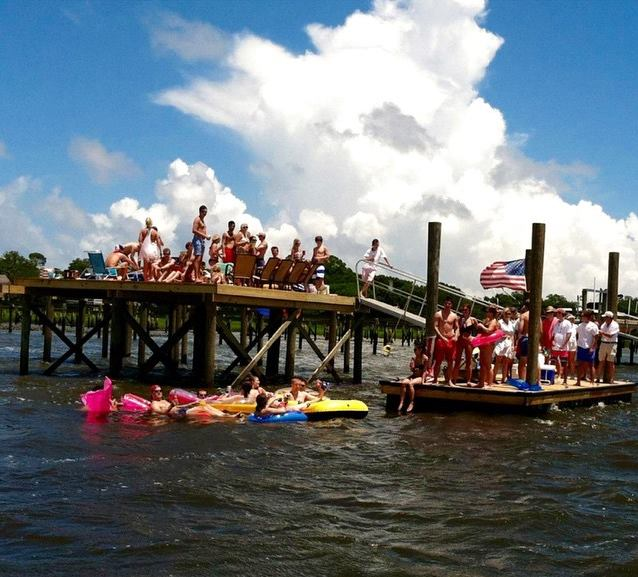
The 1st Annual Dockville Regatta seen from the Mount Pleasant Channel.

The Dockville Regatta, which began in August 2013, is an offshoot of the Rockville Regatta which is put on by the Sea Island Yacht Club of Wadmalaw Island and takes place on the same weekend each year. The first annual Dockville Regatta occurred somewhat whimsically as a number of locals sought an alternative gathering to attend on the weekend of the Rockville Regatta. To this day, the Dockville Regatta is the premier event for boaters and party-goers who want to avoid the madness of Cherry Point Boat Landing and being harassed by every DNR officer in the state at Rockville.

The advent of Dockville was met with such critical acclaim that it quickly became one of the most anticipated social events of the summer in the greater Charleston area. To celebrate the festivities, Dockville T-shirts were produced by the hundreds in anticipation of the 2nd Annual Dockville Regatta. Although Dockville is always a rain or shine event, the 3rd Annual Dockville Regatta was temporarily impeded by thunderstorms which led to the occurrence of "Porchville". When the weather cleared, the 3rd Annual Dockville went on to feature live music by local music icon DJ Sparkbox and the crowd numbered over one hundred people.

== Activities and culture ==
The primary activity at Dockville is the imbibing of libations and many attendees concern themselves with nothing else for the duration of the event. However, Dockville is home to a number of other extracurriculars including the following:

=== Floating ===
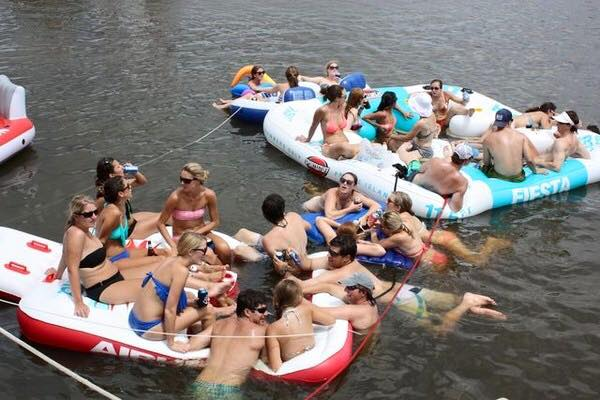
Floating is a favorite activity at Dockville and becomes a necessity when space is limited on the dock.

Many Dockvillers bring inflatable floats for lounging in the water. To prevent floaters from drifting in the current, a stationary dock line is set up across the water adjacent to the floating dock. The iconic Oasis Float Island was the flagship float of the 2nd and 3rd Annual Dockville Regattas, but it was retired after suffering multiple puncture wounds by raucous party-goers.

=== Attempts at sailing ===
Prior to the 3rd Annual Dockville Regatta, rumors circulated that an attempt would be made to hold an actual sailing regatta during Dockville. Plans were made for a small number of competitors to race their Sunfish sailboats in the Mount Pleasant Channel, but shortly before the event contestants decided it would require too much effort.

=== Boodle ===
The word “boodle” is a portmanteau from the words “beer” and “noodle”. Boodling is a hallmark method of rapidly imbibing beverages at the Dockville Regatta and involves pouring a can of beer down a pool noodle for consumption. The boodle is to be respected and this activity should only be attempted in the presence of an experienced boodler.

=== Artistic renderings ===
An iconic photograph from the 1st annual Dockville Regatta inspired a local artist to memorialize the event with an oil painting on wood.

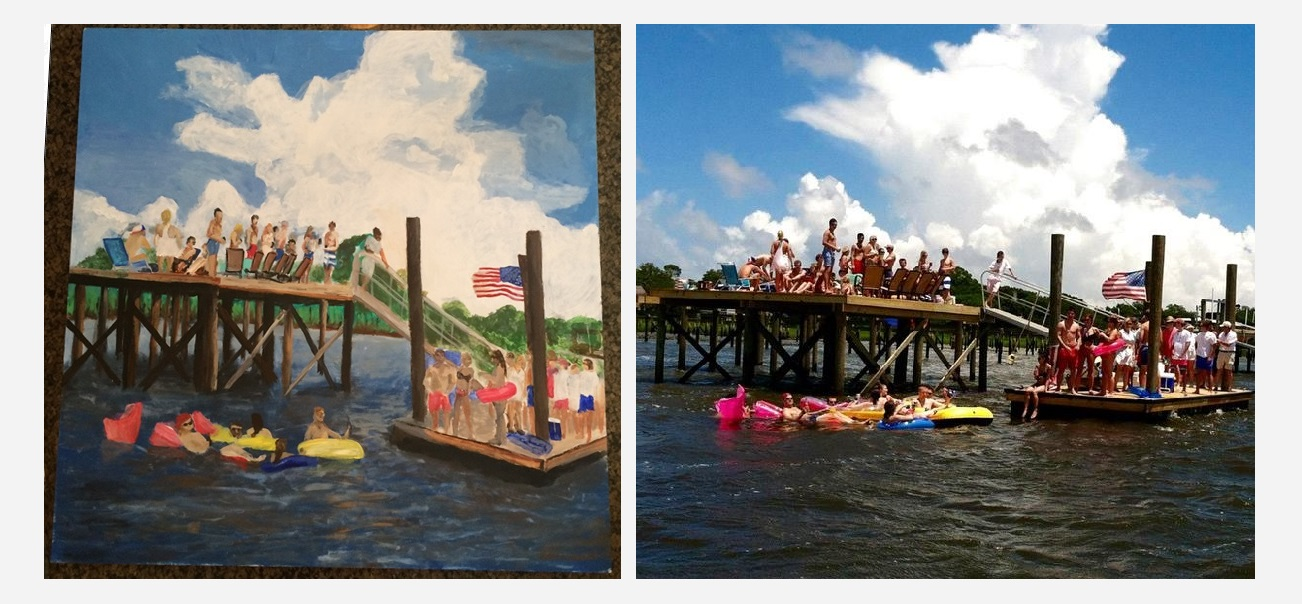
