= Aspidogaster =

Scientific classification
- Kingdom: Animalia
- Phylum: Platyhelminthes
- Class: Trematoda
- Order: Aspidogastrida
- Family: Aspidogastridae
- Genus: Aspidogaster; Baer, 1826

Genus of worms

Aspidogaster is a genus of flatworms belonging to the family Aspidogastridae.

The species of this genus are found in Europe and Northern America.

Species:

- Aspidogaster africana Saoud, El-Naffar & Abdel-Hamid, 1974
- Aspidogaster antipai Lepsi, 1932
- Aspidogaster ascidiae Diesing, 1858
- Aspidogaster chongqingensis Wei, Huang & Dai, 2001
- Aspidogaster conchicola Baer, 1827
- Aspidogaster decatis Eckmann, 1932
- Aspidogaster ijimai Kawamura, 1913
- Aspidogaster indica Dayal, 1943
- Aspidogaster limacoides Diesing, 1834
- Aspidogaster nilotica Abdel-Salam & Aboul Dahab, 1994
- Aspidogaster parabramae Tang & Tang, 1963
- Aspidogaster piscicola Rawat, 1948
- Aspidogaster tigarai Bhadauria & Dandotia, 1988
