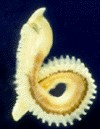
- Multicalyx elegans

Scientific classification
- Domain: Eukaryota
- Kingdom: Animalia
- Phylum: Platyhelminthes
- Class: Trematoda
- Subclass: Aspidogastrea; Faust & Tang, 1936

Orders
- Aspidogastrida; Stichocotylida

= Aspidogastrea =

Species of fluke

The Aspidogastrea (Ancient Greek: ἀσπίς aspis “shield”, γαστήρ gaster “stomach/pouch”) is a small group of flukes comprising about 80 species. It is a subclass of the trematoda, and sister group to the Digenea. Species range in length from approximately one millimeter to several centimeters. They are parasites of freshwater and marine molluscs and vertebrates (cartilaginous and bony fishes and turtles). Maturation may occur in the mollusc or vertebrate host. None of the species has any economic importance, but the group is of very great interest to biologists because it has several characters which appear to be archaic.

== Morphology ==
=== Shared characteristics ===
Shared characteristics of the group are a large ventral disc with a large number of small alveoli ("suckerlets") or a row of suckers and a tegument with short protrusions, so-called "microtubercles". Aspidogastreans are an understudied class of parasitic flatworms that possess unique anterior attachment structures and are found exclusively in freshwater and marine environments, infecting a variety of hosts including fish, amphibians, and reptiles.

=== Larval physiology ===
Larvae of some species have ciliated patches. Those of Multicotyle purvisi have four patches on the anterior side of the posterior sucker and six at the posterior side, those of Cotylogaster occidentalis have an anterior ring of eight and a posterior ring of six, while larvae of Aspidogaster conchicola, Lobatostoma manteri, Rugogaster hydrolagi lack cilia altogether. Larvae of some species hatch from eggs, others do not.

=== Excretory system ===
Like most platyhelminthes, aspidogastreans use flame cells as an excretory mechanism. The two excretory bladders are located dorsally, on the anterior side of the posterior sucker, connected to ducts, and three flame cell "bulbs" on each side of the body; the ducts contain cilia to aid the flow of excreta.

=== Nervous system ===
Aspidogastreans have a nervous system of extraordinary complexity, greater than that of related free-living forms, and a great number of sensory receptors of many different types. The nervous system is of great complexity, consisting of a great number of longitudinal nerves (connectives) connected by circular commissures. The brain (cerebral commissure) is located dorsally, in the anterior part of the body, the eyes dorsally attached to it. A nerve from the main connective enters the pharynx and also supplies the intestine. Posteriorly, the main connective enters the sucker.

Sensory receptors are scattered over the ventral and dorsal surface, the largest numbers occurring on the ventral surface, at the anterior end and on the posterior sucker. Electron-microscopic studies revealed 13 types of receptors.

== Life cycles ==
Their life cycle is much simpler than that of digenean trematodes, including a mollusc and a facultative or compulsory vertebrate host. There are no multiplicative larval stages in the mollusc host, as known from all digeneans.

Host specificity of most aspidogastreans is very low, i.e., a single species of aspidogastrean can infect a wide range of host species, whereas a typical digenean trematode is restricted to few species (at least of molluscs). For example, Aspidogaster conchicola infects many species of freshwater bivalves belonging to several families, as well as freshwater snails, many species of freshwater fishes of several families, and freshwater tortoises.

Life cycles have been elucidated for a number of species. Lobatostoma manteri is an example of a species which has obligate vertebrate hosts. Adult worms live in the small intestine of the snubnosed dart, Trachinotus blochi (Teleostei, Carangidae), on the Great Barrier Reef. They produce large numbers of eggs which are shed in the faeces. If eaten by various prosobranch snails, larvae hatch in the stomach, and—depending on the species of snail—stay there or migrate to the digestive gland where they grow up to the preadult stage which has all the characteristics of the adult including a testis and ovary.

== Evolutionary relationships ==
Digenean trematodes have been cultured in various, complex, media. However, their parasitic stages die soon in water. Aspidogastreans may survive for many days or even weeks outside a host in simple physiological saline solution). For example, adult A. conchicola survived in water for a fortnight, and in a mixture of water and saline solution for up to five weeks. L. manteri extracted from fish could be kept alive for up to 13 days in dilute sea water in which they laid eggs containing larvae infective to snails. This has led to the suggestions that aspidogastreans are archaic trematodes, not yet well adapted to specific hosts, which have given rise to the more "advanced" digenean trematodes, and that the complex life cycles of digenean trematodes have evolved from the simple ones of aspidogastreans.

Synapomorphies of the trematodes are presence of a Laurer's Canal, a posterior sucker (transformed to an adhesive disc in the Aspidogastrea), and life cycles involving molluscs and vertebrates. DNA studies have consistently supported this sister group relationship. The question of whether vertebrates or molluscs are the original hosts of the trematodes, has not been resolved.

This view is supported by the evolutionary relationships of the hosts which these two subclasses utilise. The hosts of aspidogastreans include chondrichthyan fishes (sharks, rays and chimaeras), a group that is 450 million years old, whereas the digeneans, are known from teleost fishes (210 million years old) as well as from various "higher" vertebrates; very few species have invaded chondrichthyans secondarily.

== Families within the Aspidogastrea ==
Rohde (2001) distinguish four families of Aspidogastrea:

- The Rugogastridae include a single genus, Rugogaster, with two species from the rectal glands of holocephalan fishes. It is characterised by a single row of rugae (transverse thickenings of the body surface), numerous testes, and two caeca. Species of all other families have a single caecum and either one or two testes.
- The Stichocotylidae include the single species Stichocotyle nephropis from the intestine of elasmobranchs. It has a single ventral row of well separated suckers.
- The Multicalycidae include the single genus Multicalyx from the intestine of holocephalans and elasmobranchs. It is characterised by a single ventral row of alveoli.
- The Aspidogastridae includes species infecting molluscs, teleosts and turtles. The ventral adhesive disc bears either three or four rows of alveoli. Rohde distinguishes three subfamilies of Aspidogastridae, the Rohdellinae, Cotylaspidinae and Aspidogastrinae.

Gibson further recognized two orders, the Aspidogastrida with the single family Aspidogastridae, and the Stichocotylida including the Stichocotylidae, Multicalycidae and Rugogastridae. However, similarities between species of these two orders are so great that distinction at the level of orders does not seem justified.
