= Multicalycidae =

Scientific classification
- Kingdom: Animalia
- Phylum: Platyhelminthes
- Class: Trematoda
- Subclass: Aspidogastrea
- Family: Multicalycidae; Gibson & Chinabut, 1984

Family of flukes

Multicalycidae is a family of trematodes in the order Aspidogastrida. It consists of one genus, Multicalyx Faust & Tang, 1936.

== Species ==
- Multicalyx cristata Faust & Tang, 1936
- Multicalyx elegans (Olsson, 1869)
