= Ikido =

Japanese execution method

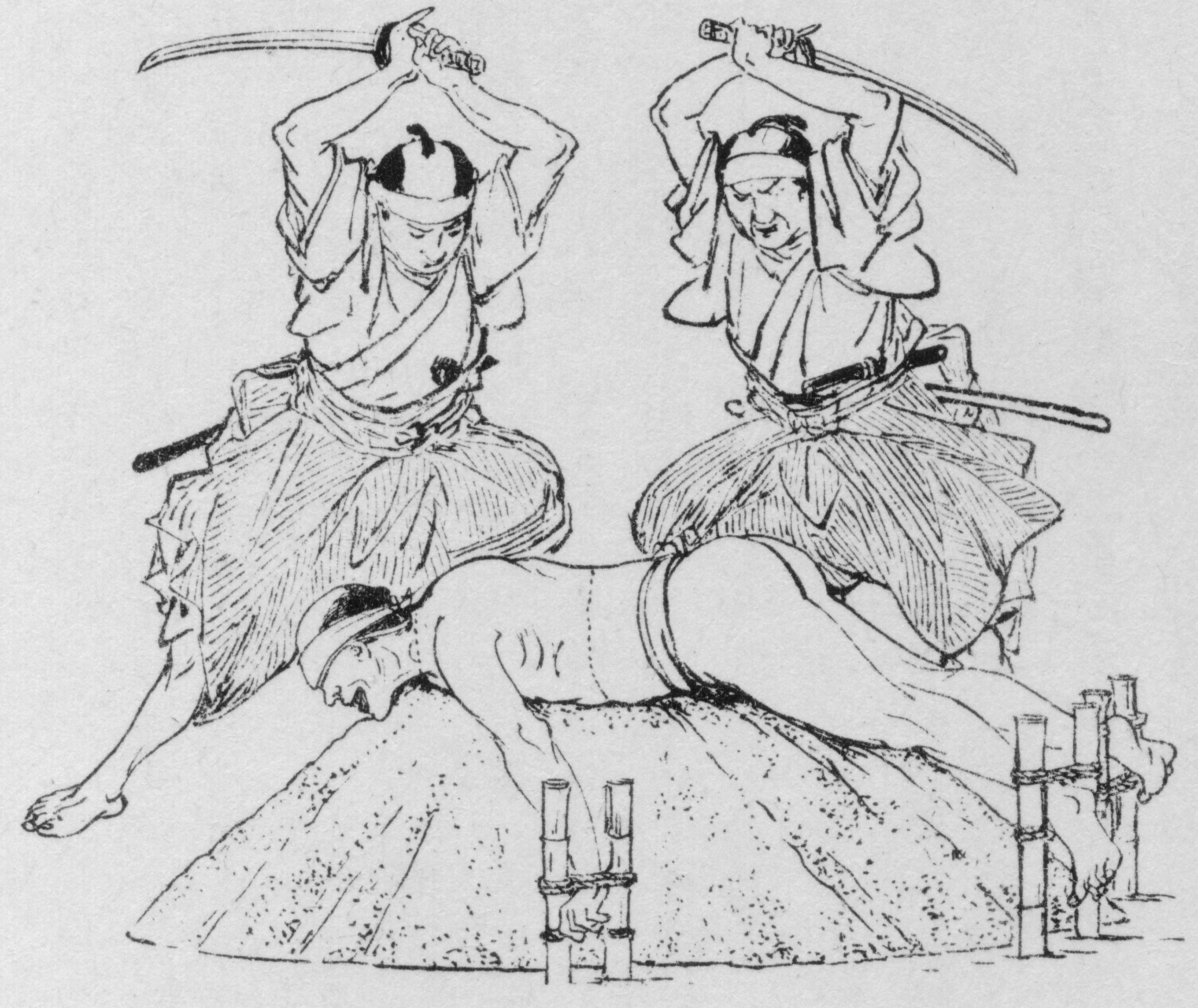
An illustration of ikido

Ikido (生き胴) is a Japanese execution method. Ikido translates to "living torso". Ikido was invented during the Edo period and was used as a form of tameshigiri (test cutting) on living and dead people.

Prior to execution, a mound of dirt was set-up on the execution site. The condemned person was laid on their stomach on the dirt mound and then blindfolded. The condemned person was then slashed with a sword on their neck and torso simultaneously, slicing the person in two. Sometimes after the execution, details of the execution were carved into the sword of the executioner.

While mostly used as a form of capital punishment, ikido was also used on ordinary citizens.

== See also ==
- Tameshigiri
