= Imutaike Prefectural Natural Park =

Natural Park in Kagoshima, Japan

- 藺牟田池県立自然公園
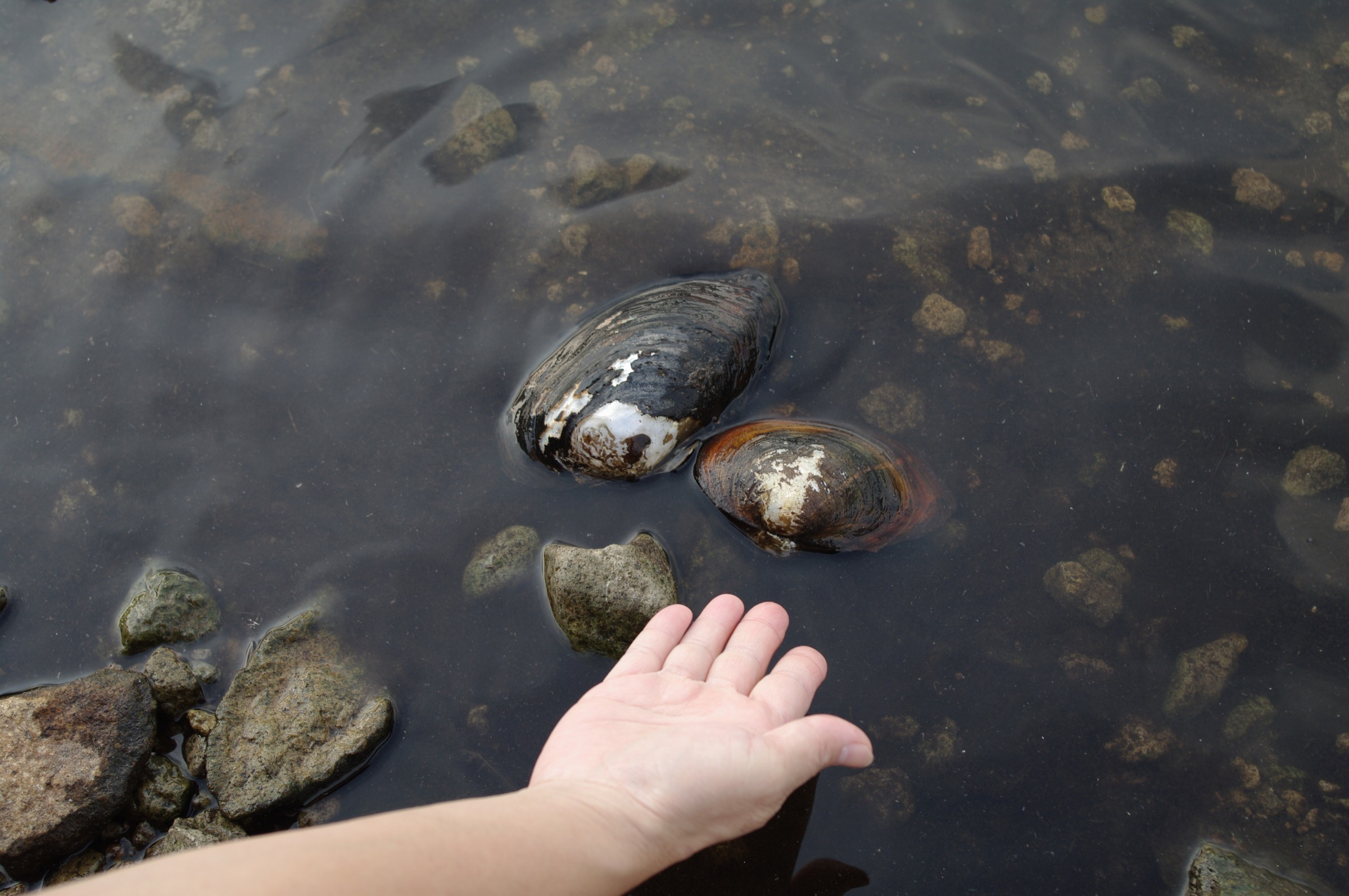
- Freshwater mussels in Imuta-ike

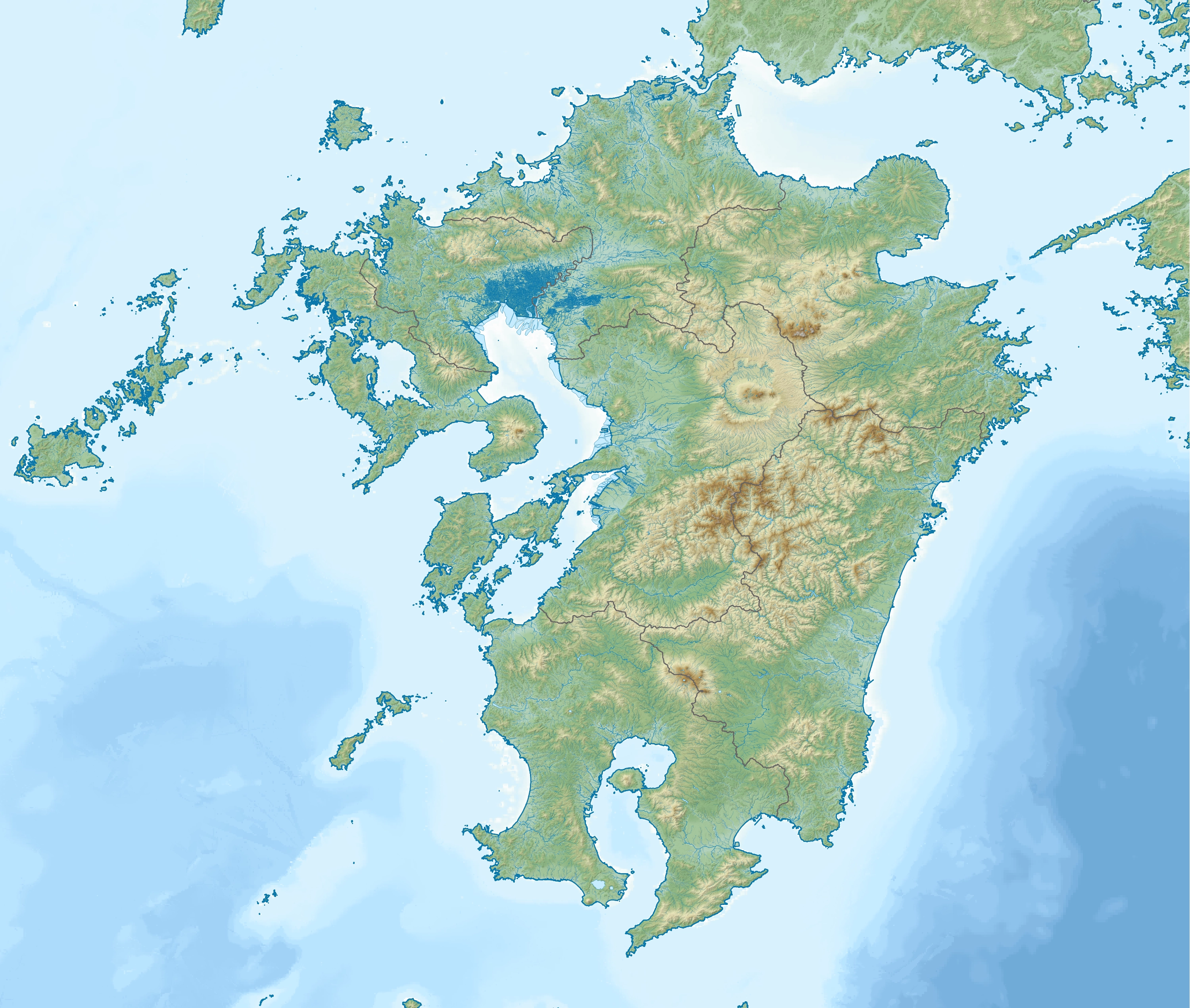
- Location within Kagoshima Prefecture Location within Kyushu Location within Japan
- Location: Kagoshima Prefecture, Japan
- Coordinates: 31.8°N 130.47°E
- Area: 39.38 km^{2} (15.20 sq mi)
- Established: 31 March 1953

Imutaike Prefectural Natural Park (藺牟田池県立自然公園, Imutaike kenritsu shizen kōen) is a Prefectural Natural Park in central Kagoshima Prefecture, Japan. Established in 1953, the park spans the municipalities of Aira, Satsuma, and Satsumasendai.

== See also ==
- National Parks of Japan
- Ramsar Sites in Japan
