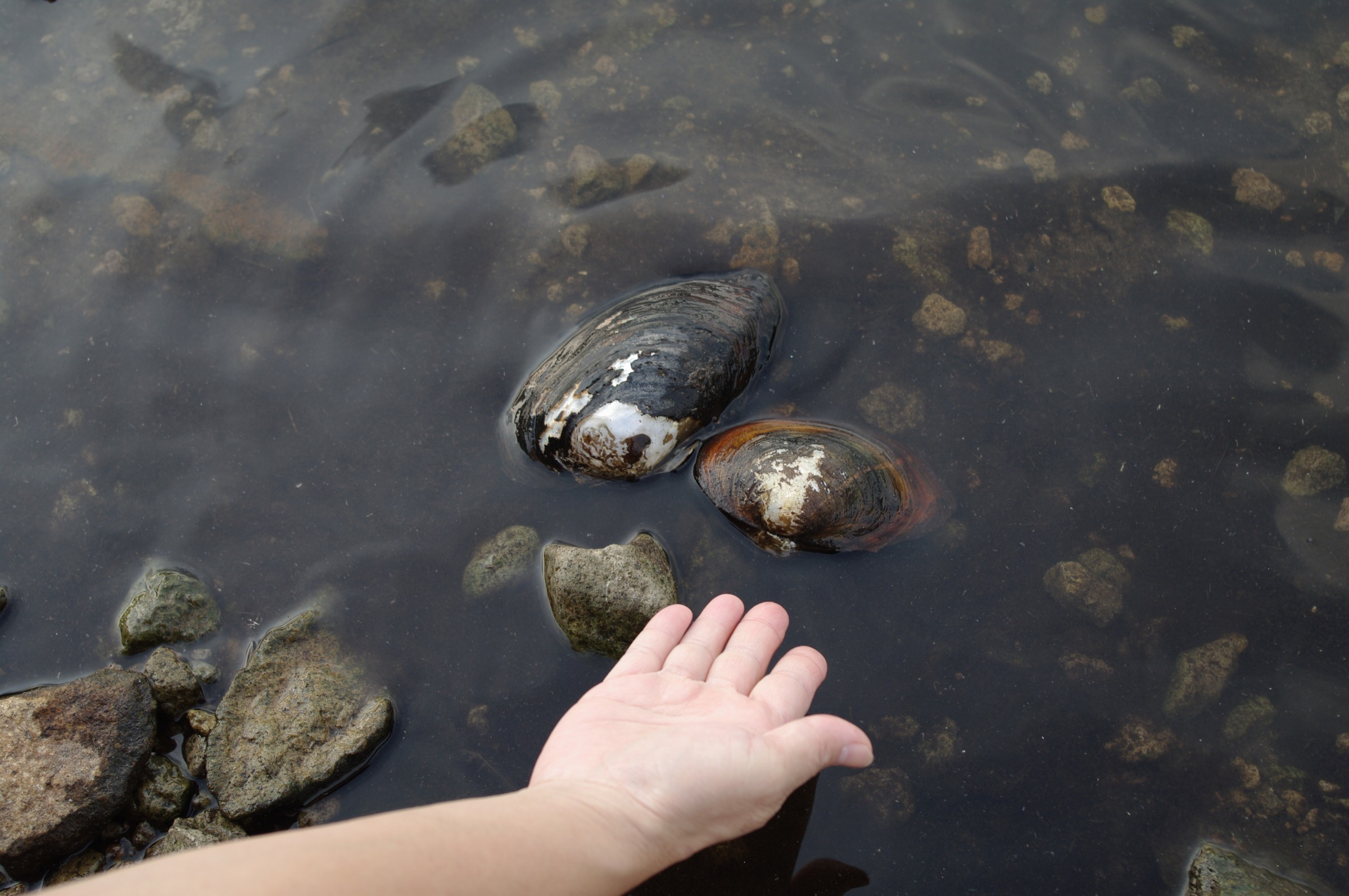
- Two live individuals of Sinanodonta woodiana in Imutaike Prefectural Natural Park, Japan
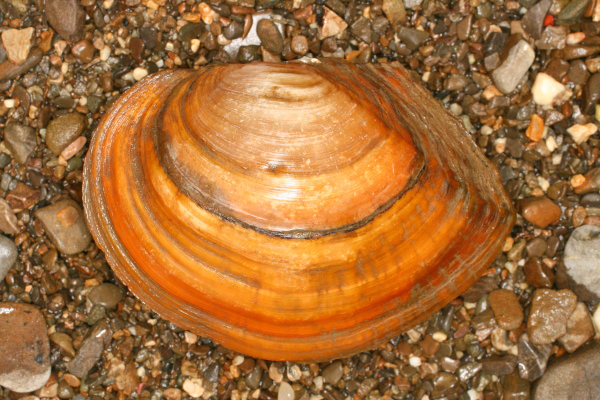
- River Morava, Austria/Slovakia

Conservation status
- Least Concern (IUCN 3.1)

Scientific classification
- Kingdom: Animalia
- Phylum: Mollusca
- Class: Bivalvia
- Order: Unionida
- Family: Unionidae
- Genus: Sinanodonta
- Species: S. woodiana

Binomial name
- Sinanodonta woodiana (I. Lea, 1834)

Synonyms
- Anodonta woodiana (I. Lea, 1834); Symphynota woodiana I. Lea, 1834; Anodonta edulis Heude, 1874

= Sinanodonta woodiana =

Species of bivalve

Sinanodonta woodiana, the Chinese pond mussel, Eastern Asiatic freshwater clam or swan-mussel, is a species of freshwater mussel, an aquatic bivalve mollusk, in the family Unionidae (the river mussels).

Right and left valve of the same specimen:

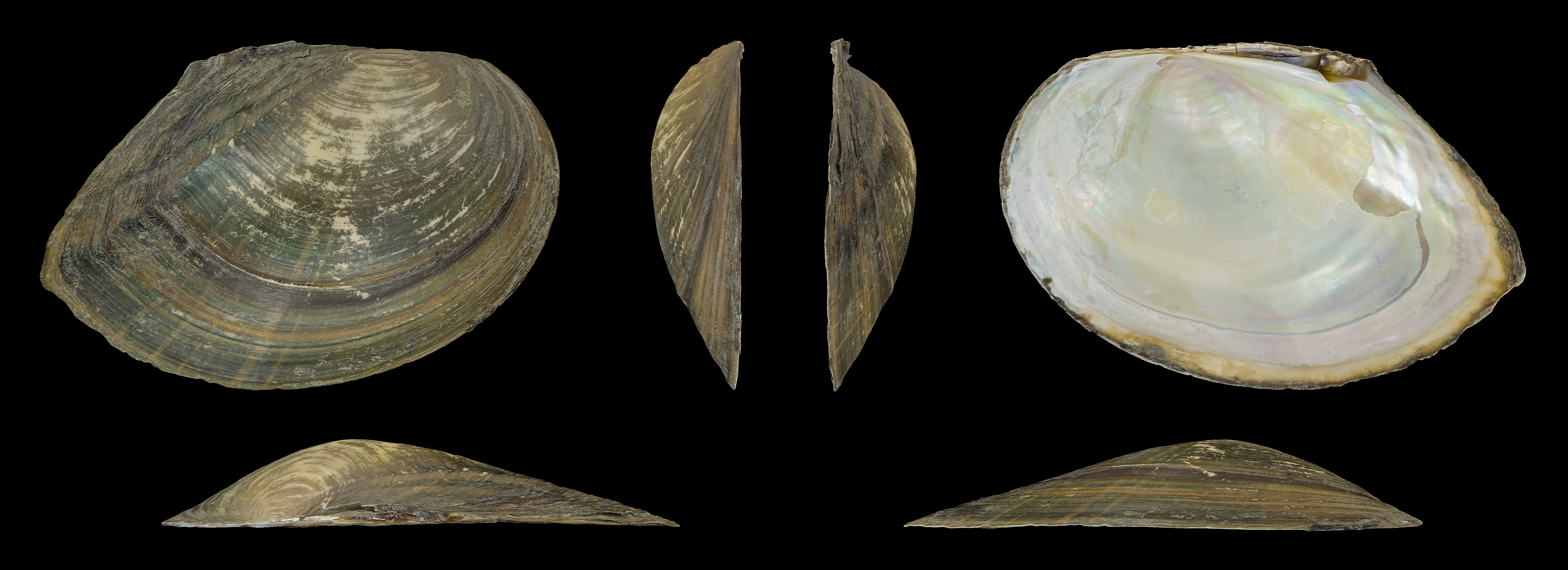
Right valve

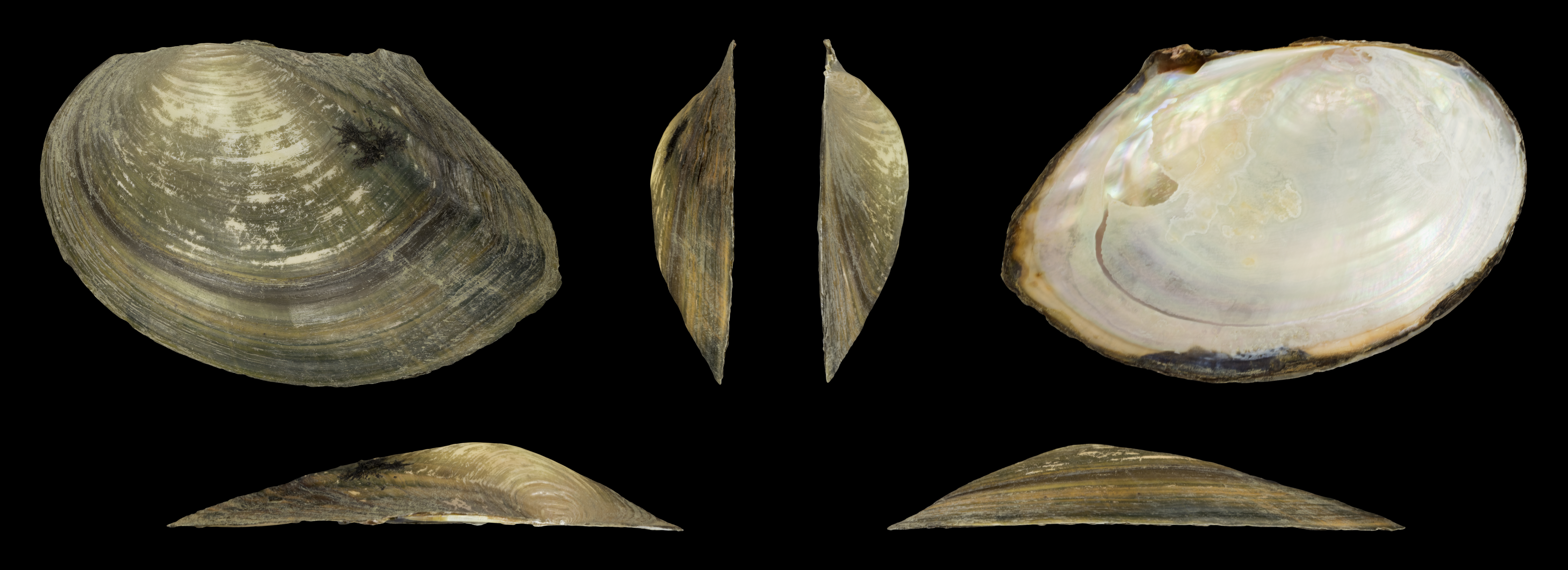
Left valve

== Distribution ==
- Indigenous to Eastern Asia
- Non-native/introduced to Europe:
  - Austria
  - Belgium
  - Croatia
  - Czech Republic – non-indigenous in Bohemia since 2001, non-indigenous in Moravia since 1996; not evaluated (NE)
  - France
  - Germany
  - Greece
  - Hungary
  - Italy
  - The Netherlands
  - Poland
  - Romania
  - Serbia
  - Slovakia
  - Spain
  - Ukraine
  - Switzerland
- non-native on some Indonesian islands
- non-native in the Americas:
  - Costa Rica
  - Dominican Republic
  - United States (extirpated from New Jersey)
- non-native in Africa:
  - Algeria– non-native in Oubeira Lake since 2023

Asia

- Myanmar – non-native; first reported in 2017

== Ecology ==
Sinanodonta woodiana, the Chinese pond mussel, is a species of East Asian freshwater unionid bivalve mollusk primarily known from the Amur River, in the Russian Far East, and China's Yangtze River. The Chinese pond mussel can grow to 30 cm and attain an age of 12–14 years, and they can reproduce by the end of their first year, while only 3–4 cm in size.

This large, freshwater bivalve is a habitat generalist, with a high silt tolerance. It is established worldwide; like all unionid mussels, it has an obligatory parasitic stage (glochidium), in which the larva must encyst on a host fish to complete its development. Host species include invasive, non-native and native fishes. The presence of S. woodiana can seriously affect local unionid populations.

S. woodiana's great success is attributed to the importation and commercialisation of Asian carp, its native Asian host, which is now found worldwide, as well. S. woodiana was introduced in Tuscany both inadvertently and intentionally, for artificial/imitation pearl production. The species is also sold in some garden centers as biofiltration for outdoor ponds and water features.

Parasites:

- Aspidogaster conchicola (Aspidogastrea)
