= Stichocotyle =

Scientific classification
- Kingdom: Animalia
- Phylum: Platyhelminthes
- Class: Trematoda
- Subclass: Aspidogastrea
- Order: Stichocotylida; Gibson & Chinabut, 1984
- Family: Stichocotylidae; Faust & Tang, 1936
- Genus: Stichocotyle; Cunningham, 1884
- Species: S. nephropis

Binomial name
- Stichocotyle nephropis Cunningham, 1884

Genus of flukes

Stichocotyle is a monospecific genus of trematodes, in the monospecific family Stichocotylidae, which is itself in the monotypic order Stichocotylida. It comprises the single species Stichocotyle nephropis, which is an internal parasite of elasmobranch fishes. It was originally described from the Norway lobster, Nephrops norvegicus, by J. T. Cunningham in 1884. This flatworm is distinguished by a single ventral row of well separated suckers.

Stichocotyle has not been seen since 1986, and it is possible that it is extinct. Like many parasites, it relied on multiple hosts, and its disappearance is hypothesized to be associated with declines in some of these hosts. The thornback ray Raja clavata and the barndoor skate Dipturus laevis were hosts for the adult form, and have declined because they are killed as bycatch in fisheries. The thornback ray is listed as "Near Threatened," and the barndoor skate is globally listed as "Endangered" on the IUCN Red List.
