= Tameshigiri =

Japanese art of target test cutting

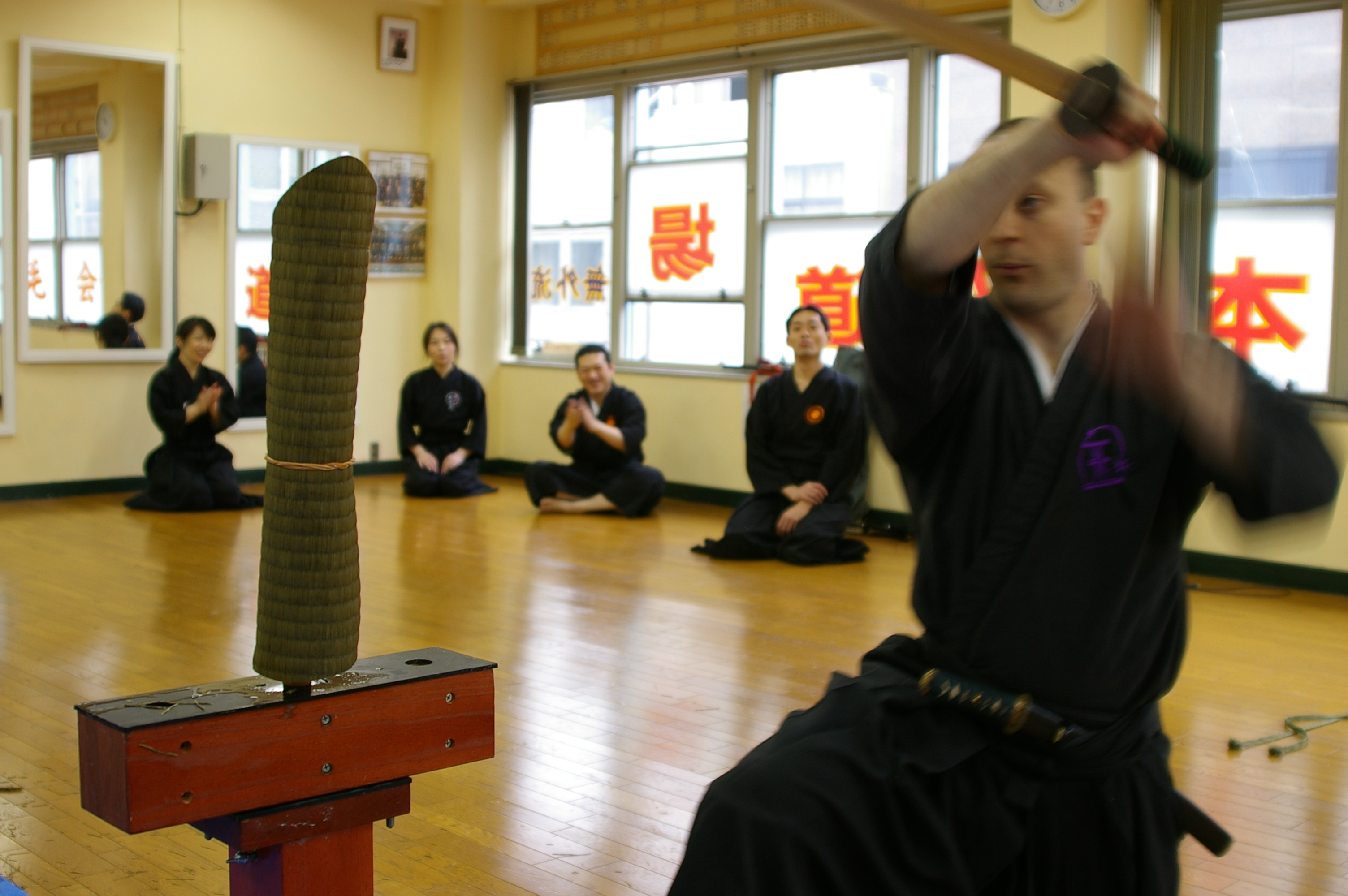
Tameshigiri using a goza target on a stand (2006) Ren Kuroda demonstrates Shofu at the Mugairyu Meishi-ha dojo in Tokyo, Japan

Tameshigiri (Japanese: 試し斬り, 試し切り, 試斬, 試切) is the Japanese art of target test cutting. The kanji literally means "test cut". This practice was popularized in the Edo period (17th century) for testing the quality of Japanese swords. It continues to the present day, but has evolved into a martial art which focuses on demonstrating the practitioner's skill with a sword.

== Origins ==
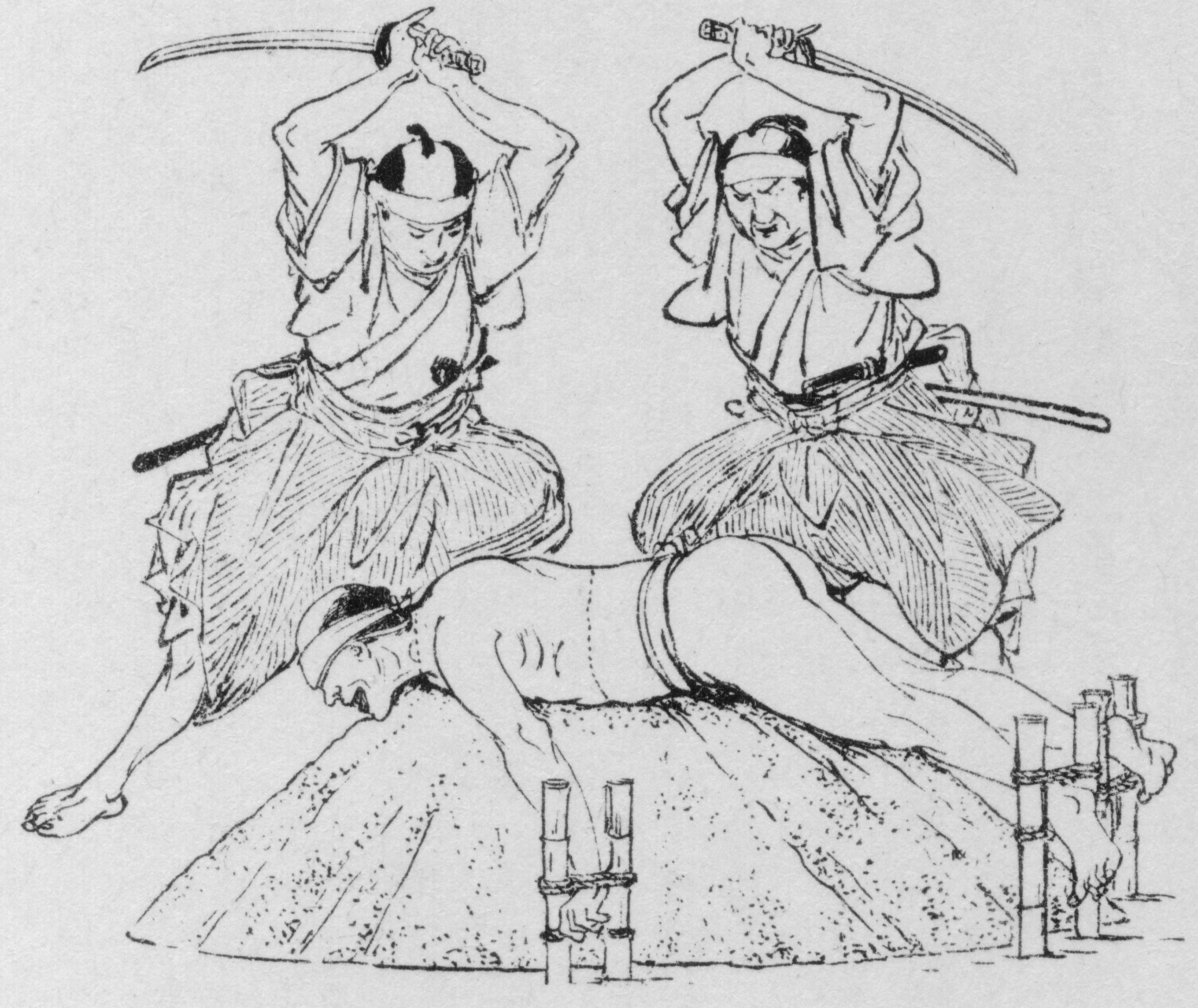
Tameshigiri on a convicted criminal (illustration from a 1927 book)

During the Edo period, only the most skilled swordsmen were chosen to test swords, so that the swordsman's skill was not questionable in determining how well the sword cut. The materials used to test swords varied greatly. Some substances were rice straw (藁, wara), woven rush mats (茣蓙, goza) or the top layer of tatami mats (畳表, tatami-omote), bamboo, and thin steel sheets.

In addition, there was a wide variety of cuts used on cadavers and occasionally convicted criminals, from tabi-gata (ankle cut) to O-kesa (diagonal cut from shoulder to opposite hip). The names of the types of cuts on cadavers show exactly where on the body the cut was made. Older swords can still be found which have inscriptions on their tang (中心, nakago) that say such things as "5 bodies with Ryu Guruma (hip cut)". Such an inscription, known as a tameshi-mei (試し銘) or saidan-mei (裁断銘) (cutting signature) would add greatly to a sword's value, compensating the owner somewhat for the large sums of money typically charged for the test.

Aside from specific cuts made on cadavers, there were the normal cuts of Japanese swordsmanship, i.e. downward diagonal (袈裟斬り, Kesa-giri), upward diagonal (切り上げ, Kiri-age) or Gyaku-kesa (逆袈裟), horizontal (Yoko, 横 or Tsuihei), and straight downward (上段斬り, Jōdan-giri), Happonme (八本目), Makkō-giri (真向斬り), Shinchoku-giri (真直切り), or Dotan-giri (土壇切り).

There is an apocryphal story of a condemned criminal who, after being told he was to be executed by a sword tester using a Kesa-giri cut, calmly joked that if he had known that was going to happen, he would have swallowed large stones to damage the blade.

Some samurai would instead test their weapon's quality (or a new fighting style) on a human target besides convicted criminals, usually a random civilian passerby at night; this infamous practice was not known as tameshigiri but instead as tsujigiri.

During the Sino-Japanese War and World War II, Japanese officers routinely tested their new swords on captured Allied soldiers and Chinese civilians. Lieutenants Mukai and Noda held a competition to see who could behead 100 people fastest using a katana. The story was spread by a Japanese newspaper, the Mainichi Shimbun in 1937. Tokyo District Court Judge Akio Doi in charge of judging the matter in Japan later said, "The lieutenants admitted the fact that they raced to kill 100 people. We cannot deny that the article included some false elements and exaggeration, but it is difficult to say the article was fiction not based on facts."

== Today ==
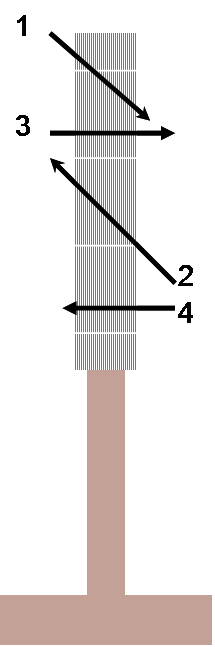
Diagram of the Tsubamegaeshi (燕返し) cutting pattern on a goza target

In modern times, the practice of tameshigiri has come to focus on testing the swordsman's abilities, rather than the sword's cutting capability. The swords used are typically inexpensive ones.

Practitioners of tameshigiri sometimes use the terms Shitō (試刀, sword testing) and Shizan (試斬, test cutting, an alternate pronunciation of the characters for tameshigiri) to distinguish between the historical practice of testing swords and the contemporary practice of testing one's cutting ability. The target most often used is the tatami "omote" rush mat. To be able to cut consecutive times on one target, or to cut multiple targets while moving, requires that one be a very skilled swordsman.

Targets today are typically made from goza, the top layer of the traditional tatami floor covering, either bundled or rolled into a cylindrical shape. They may be soaked in water to add density to the material. This density is to approximate that of flesh. Green bamboo is used to approximate bone.

Once the goza target is in this cylindrical shape, it has a vertical grain pattern when stood vertically on a target stand, or horizontally when placed on a horizontal target stand (dotton or dodan). This direction of the grain affects the difficulty of the cut.

The difficulty of cuts is a combination of the target material hardness, the direction of the grain of the target (if any), the quality of the sword, the angle of the blade (刃筋; hasuji) on impact, and the angle of the swing of the sword (太刀筋; tachisuji).

When cutting a straw target that is standing vertically, the easiest cut is the downward diagonal. This is due to a combination of the angle of impact of the cut against the grain (approximately 30-50 degrees from the surface), the downward diagonal angle of the swing, and the ability to use many of the major muscle groups and rotation of the body to aid in the cut.

Next in difficulty is the upward diagonal cut which has the same angle, but works against gravity and uses slightly different muscles and rotation. The third in difficulty is the straight downward cut, not in terms of the grain but in terms of the group of muscles involved. The most difficult cut of these four basic cuts is the horizontal direction (against a vertical target) which is directly perpendicular to the grain of the target.

Historical European Martial Arts reconstructors, under the term "test cutting", engage in similar exercises with various European swords. While goza, green bamboo (though rarely), and meat are the preferred cutting targets, other substances are commonly used due to being cheaper, and much easier to obtain: pool noodles, various gourds (pumpkins, squash, etc.), water-filled plastic bottles, soaked newspaper rolls, synthetic targets or wet clay.

== World records ==
Many world records have been achieved with the katana which are certified by the Guinness World Records.

- Mitsuhiro Saruta, founder of Ryuseiken, set the initial Guinness World Record for completing 1000 cuts (senbongiri) in 1 hour 36 minutes on September 20, 1998.
- In 2000, Russell McCartney of Ishiyama-ryū completed 1181 consecutive cuts without a missed attempt in 1 hour 25 minutes. Both Saruta and McCartney performed senbongiri using a kata-based approach as one of the criteria for their challenge.
- Isao Machii of Shūshinryū currently has the record for the fastest senbongiri performance of 36 minutes and 4 seconds completion of 1,000 cuts of rolled straw mats.
- Machii also holds records for the most cuts in three minutes (252) on 21 April 2011.
- Machii also has most cuts to 1 mat (suegiri) with a total of 8 times on 23 April 2015.
- The record for most martial arts sword cuts in one minute (73) is held by Agisilaos Vesexidis of Greece on 25 June 2016.
- Toshishiro Obata holds the record for kabuto wari (兜割), or helmet cutting, for his cut on a steel kabuto (兜; helmet).
- Obata also holds the ioriken battōjutsu speed cutting record for 10 cuts on 10 targets over three rounds. His times are 6.4, 6.4, and 6.7 seconds respectively.
- Brandt Noel of San Yama Ryu Bujutsu holds the Guinness World Record of 19 mats with katana using kesa-giri.
- The current record for total number of mats cut with a daitō (25 mats) was set by Bruce Baldwin at the 2009 Japan Festival in Houston. The world record was certified and confirmed by the Consul General of Japan at Houston.
- On February 24, 2013, at the Sherwood Fair, Bruce Baldwin cut 26 mats to take the world record in the ōdachi class sword.

== Target configurations ==
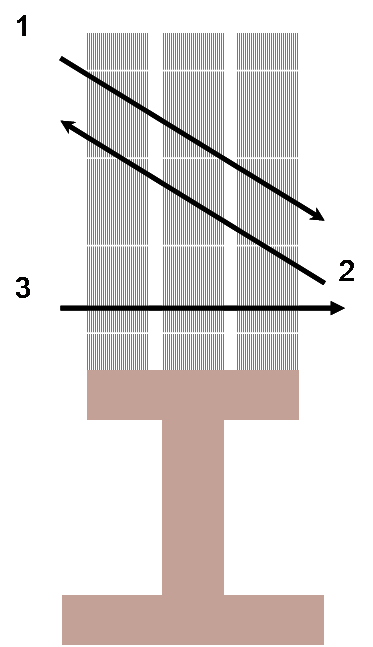
Diagram of the Kihon tōhō (基本刀法) tameshigiri cutting pattern performed on three targets

The targets can be placed in different configurations:

1. Most frequently, there is a single stand on which a single target is placed vertically.
2. A second configuration involves multiple targets in place vertically on a long stand (a yoko-narabi).
3. A third configuration involves multiple targets placed horizontally on a different type of stand called a dodan or dotton.
4. A fourth configuration involves single (#1) or multiple targets (#2), each on separate stands.
5. A fifth configuration (particular to rolled goza) involves multiple targets rolled together to create a thicker and denser target. This can be used in the previous configurations (#1, #2, #3).
