= Pool noodle =

Foam pool toy

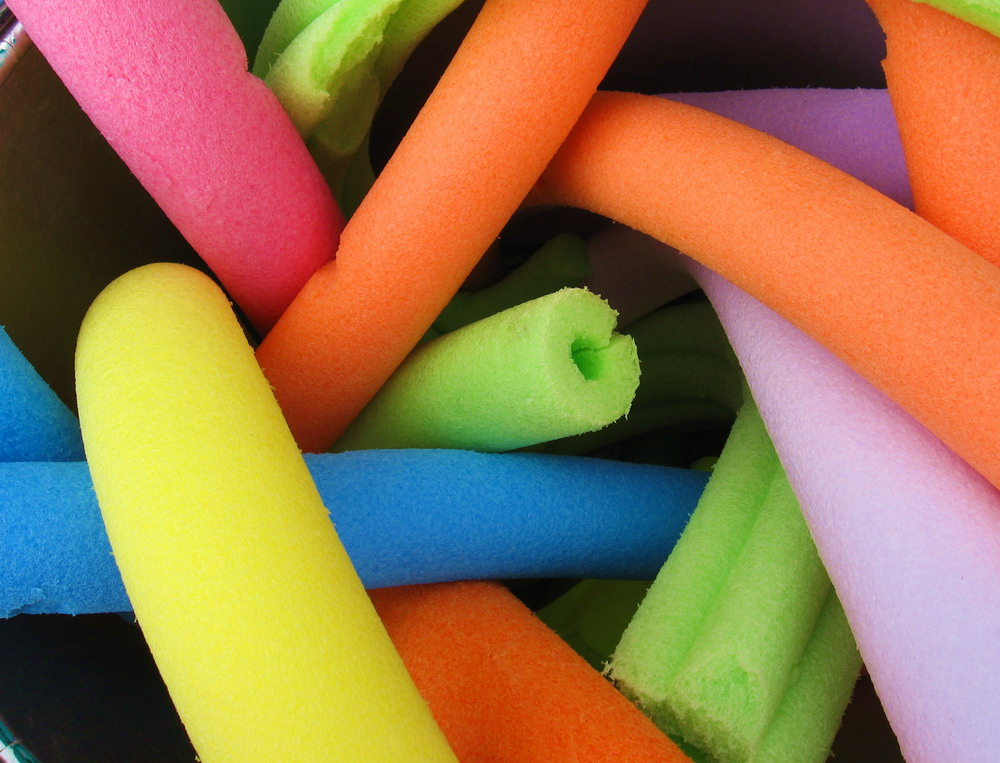
Colorful pool noodles

A pool noodle is a cylindrical piece of flexible, buoyant polyethylene foam. People of all ages use pool noodles while swimming.

Pool noodles are useful to those learning to swim, floating, or engaging in rescue reaching, water play, or aquatic exercise. The most common dimensions are about 160 centimetres (5 ft 3 in) in length and 7 centimetres (3 in) in diameter. The pool noodle is also used for people who experience difficulties in swimming.

The pool noodle is often used to protect sharp edges and corners.

== History ==
The invention of the pool noodle is generally credited to Steve Hartman of Industrial Thermal Polymers in Toronto, Ontario, Canada, in the early 1980s. Hartman, whose family business manufactured foam backer rods used for sealing expansion joints in construction, began marketing the brightly colored 9-foot foam tubes as pool toys. Fellow Canadian Richard Koster also claims to have independently invented the device around the same time. Neither man secured a patent for the pool noodle, allowing it to be widely manufactured and imitated.

== Types ==
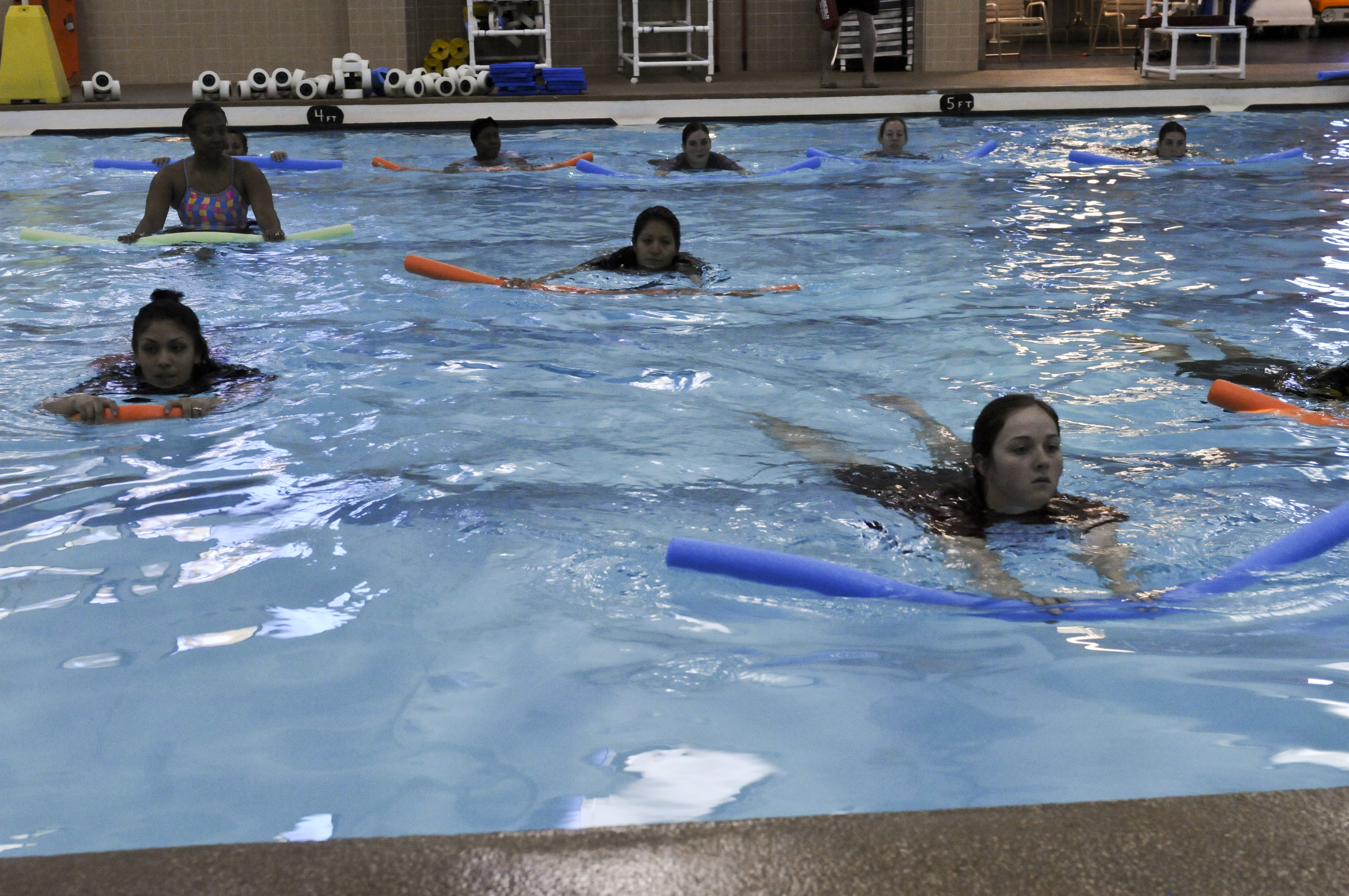
Women floating with pool noodles

The term "water woggle" derives from Koswell Holdings trademark Water Woggle, which was first marketed as a foam water toy in the 1980s.

== Connectors ==
There are several pool noodle connectors on the market. One connector is a piece of pipe made out of foam, slightly larger than a pool noodle so that it can connect two pool noodles by encasing the end of each. There are several other connectors made of food-grade polypropylene that are manufactured in Australia and the USA.

This noodle connector comes in the form of an erector set that is screwed into the cavity or center of the foam noodle and attaches to a six-sided noodle connector. This allows larger structures to be built from pool noodles. There exist at least two-, four- and six-hole foam connectors and a variety of polypropylene connector parts that enable users to build all types of structures and designs.

== Other uses ==
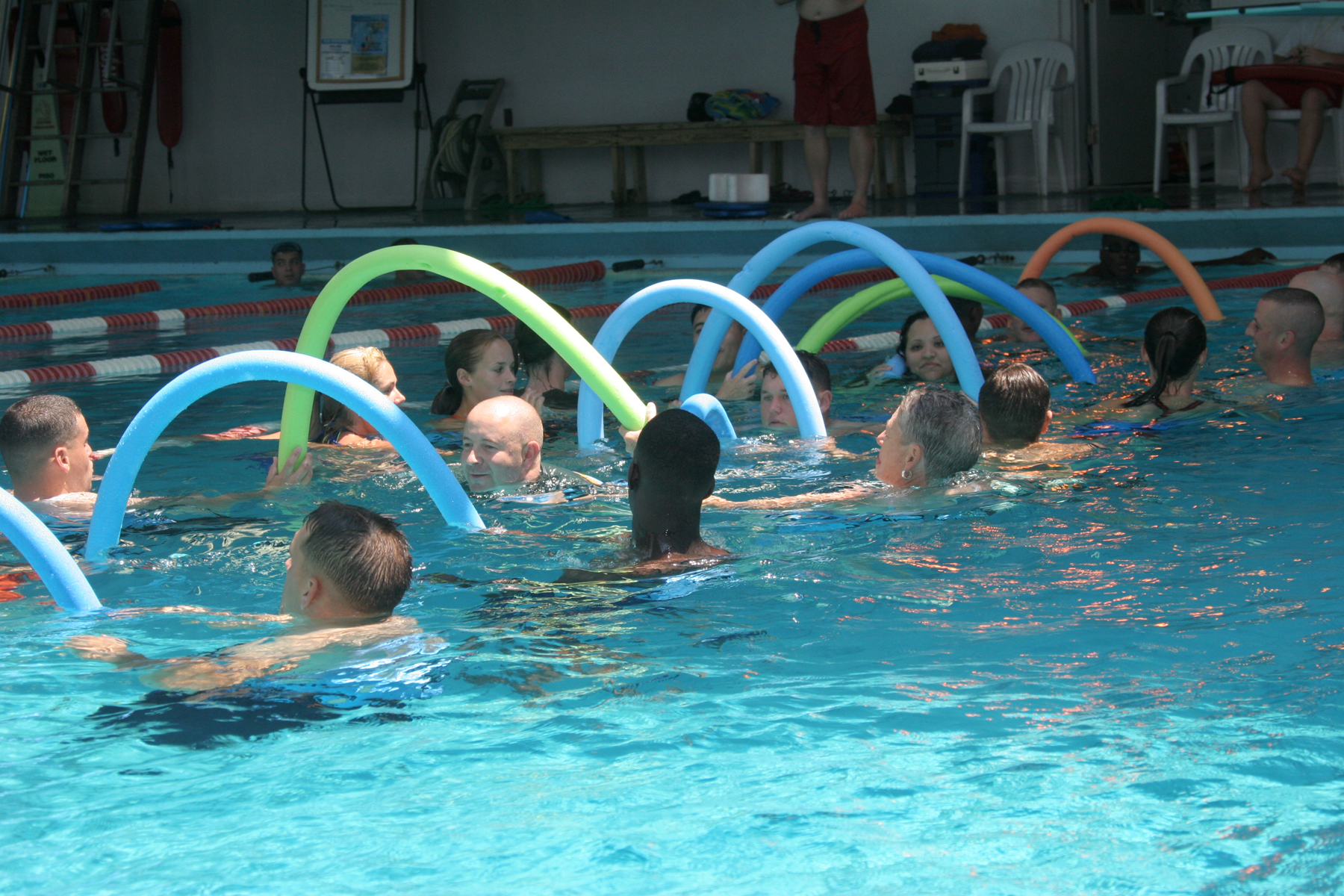
Pool noodles used during an exercise in a U.S. Marine Corps aerobics class

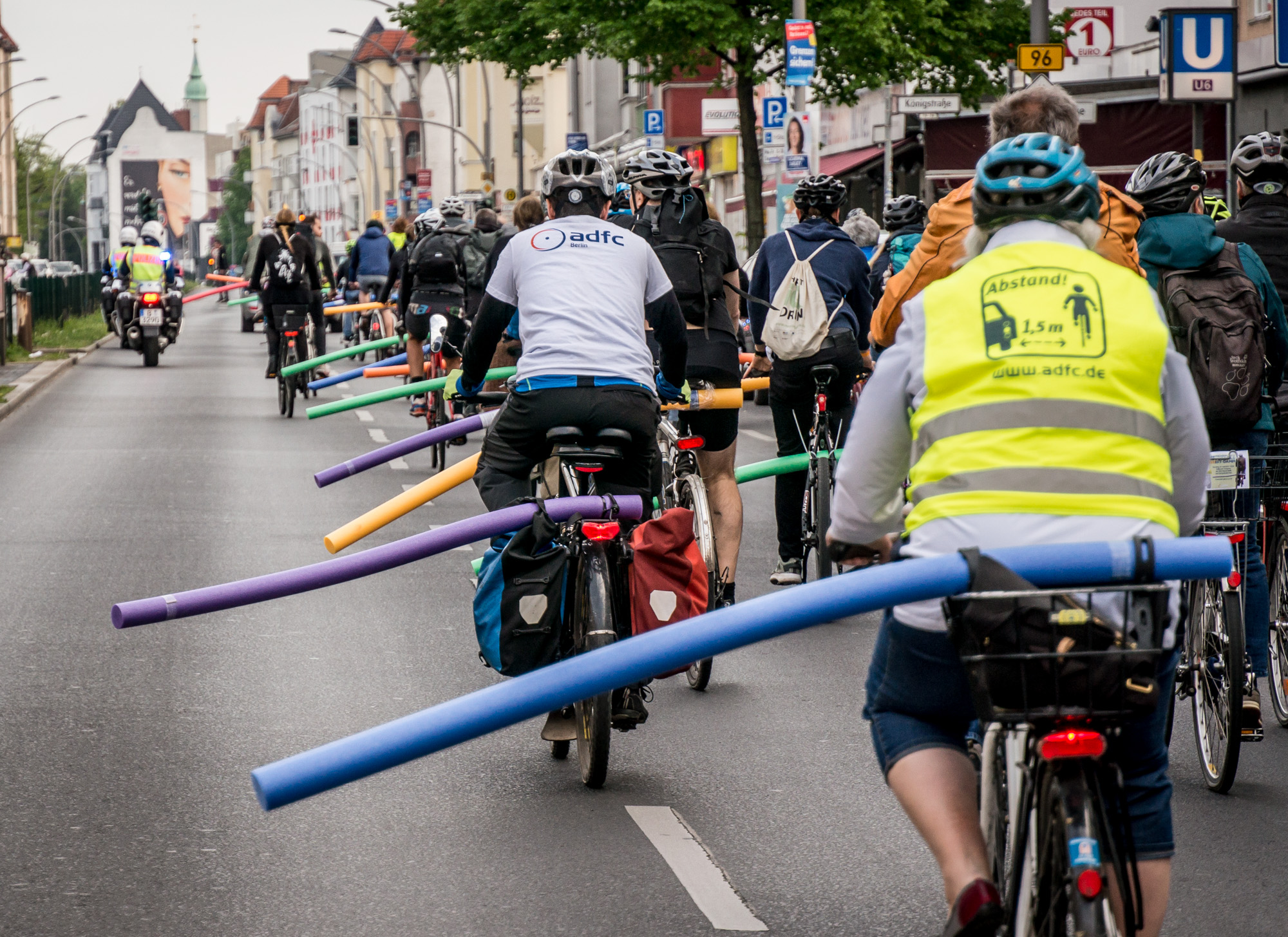
Cyclists demonstrating what the minimum safe passing distance would be with pool noodles

Pool noodles are similar to some types of industrial and residential foam insulation for pipes. Pipe insulation sleeves are made from a variety of materials, primarily EPDM rubber foam (which typically has greater resistance to high temperatures than expanded polyethylene foam). Despite this, pool noodles have been used as an improvised substitute for commercial pipe insulation.

Modern martial artists occasionally use pool noodles as tameshigiri (test cutting) targets, in lieu of more expensive targets like meat or tatami omote mats.

FIRST Robotics Competition robots use the foam from pool noodles as a bumper to protect the robots from damage during collisions.

Customers often use pool noodles for their own boots to prevent the boots flopping over in the closet.

Cyclists have begun to use them as a safety tool.
