= Rugogaster =

Scientific classification
- Kingdom: Animalia
- Phylum: Platyhelminthes
- Class: Trematoda
- Order: Aspidogastrida
- Family: Rugogastridae; Schell, 1973
- Genus: Rugogaster; Schell, 1973

Type species
- Rugogaster hydrolagi Schell, 1973

Species
- Rugogaster callorhinchi Amato & Pereira, 1995; Rugogaster hydrolagi Schell, 1973

Family of flukes

Rugogastridae is a family of trematodes in the order Aspidogastrida. It consists of a single genus, Rugogaster Schell, 1973.

== Species ==
- Rugogaster callorhinci Amato & Pereira, 1995
- Rugogaster hydrolagi Schell, 1973

== Morphological characteristics ==
Species of Rugogaster are parasitic in the rectal glands of various holocephalan fishes. They are characterized by a row of rugae, numerous testes, and two caeca, whilst other aspidogastrid species generally have one caecum and one or two testes.
