= Tatami =

Straw mat used as flooring in Japan

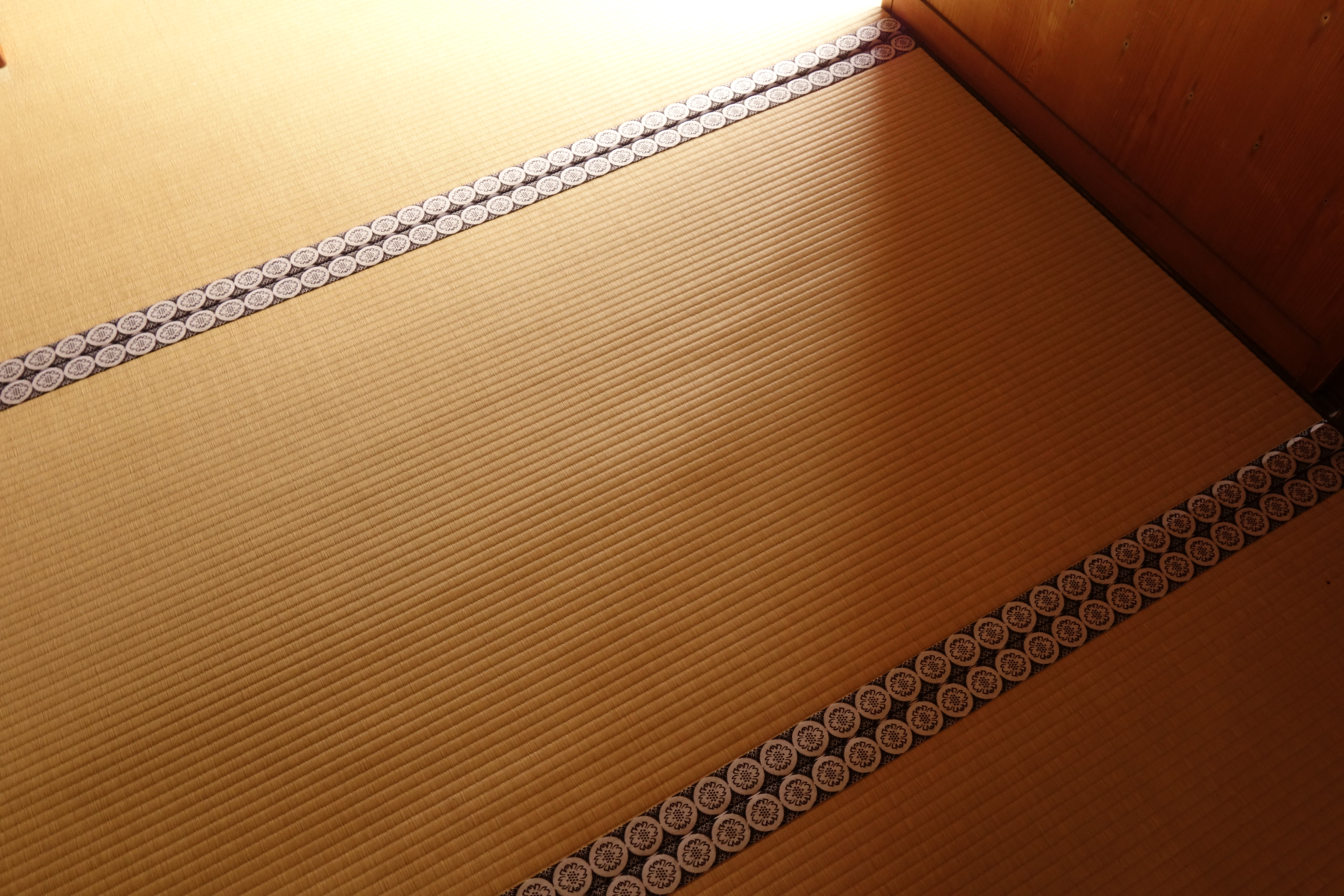
Tatami mat in Enkō-ji

Tatami (畳) are soft mats used as flooring material in traditional Japanese-style rooms. They are made in standard sizes, twice as long as wide, about 0.9 by 1.8 metres (3 by 6 ft), depending on the region. In martial arts, tatami are used for training in a dojo and for competition.

Tatami are covered with a weft-faced weave of soft rush (藺草, igusa) on a warp of hemp or weaker cotton. There are four warps per weft shed, two at each end (or sometimes two per shed, one at each end, to reduce cost). The doko (core) is traditionally made from sewn-together rice straw, but contemporary tatami sometimes have compressed wood chip boards or extruded polystyrene foam in their cores instead or as well. The long sides are usually edged (縁, heri) with brocade or plain cloth, although some tatami have no edging.

Tatami have also traditionally been used for tameshigiri, the Japanese art of target test cutting.

Construction

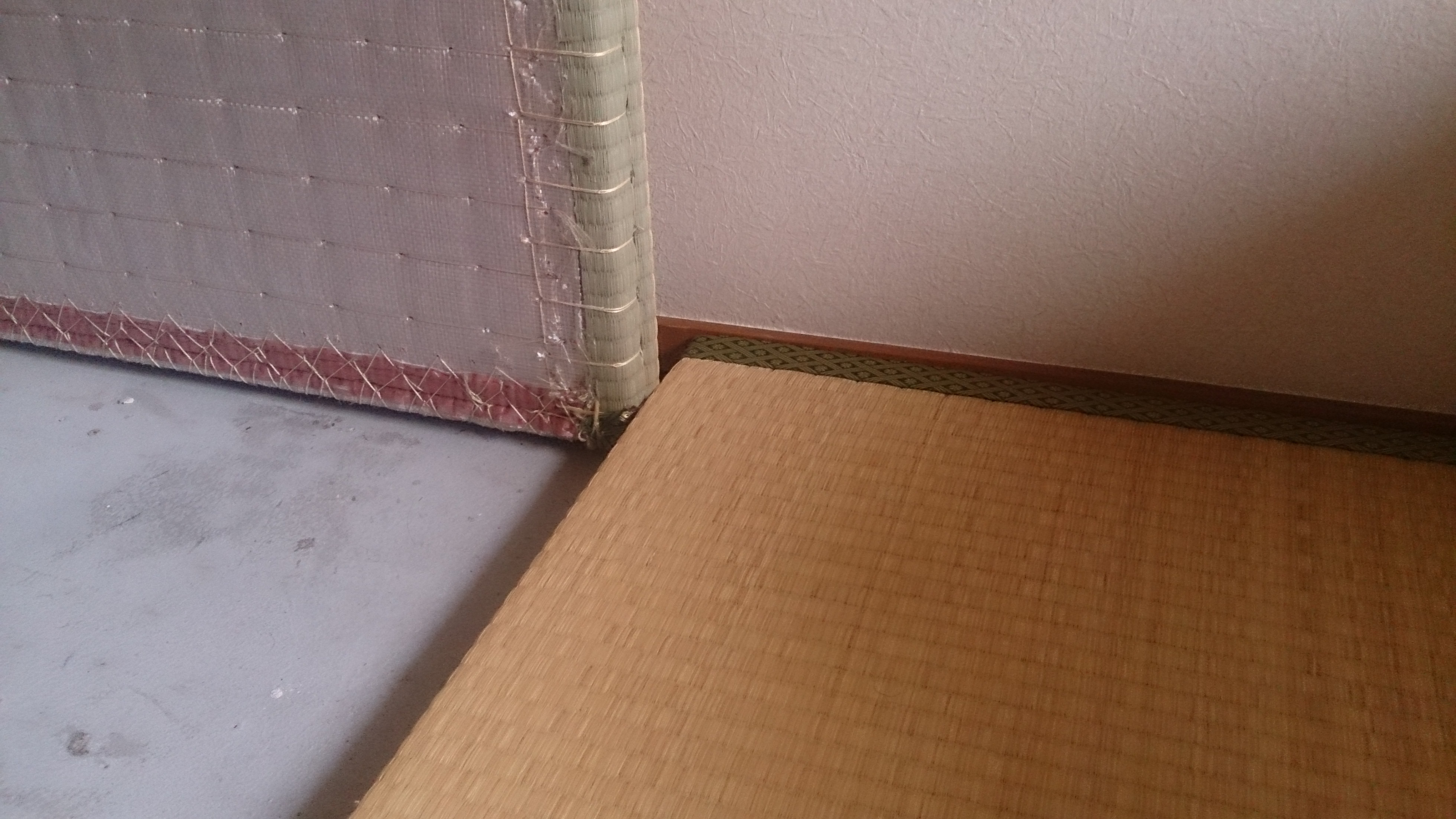
Machine-sewing of tatami

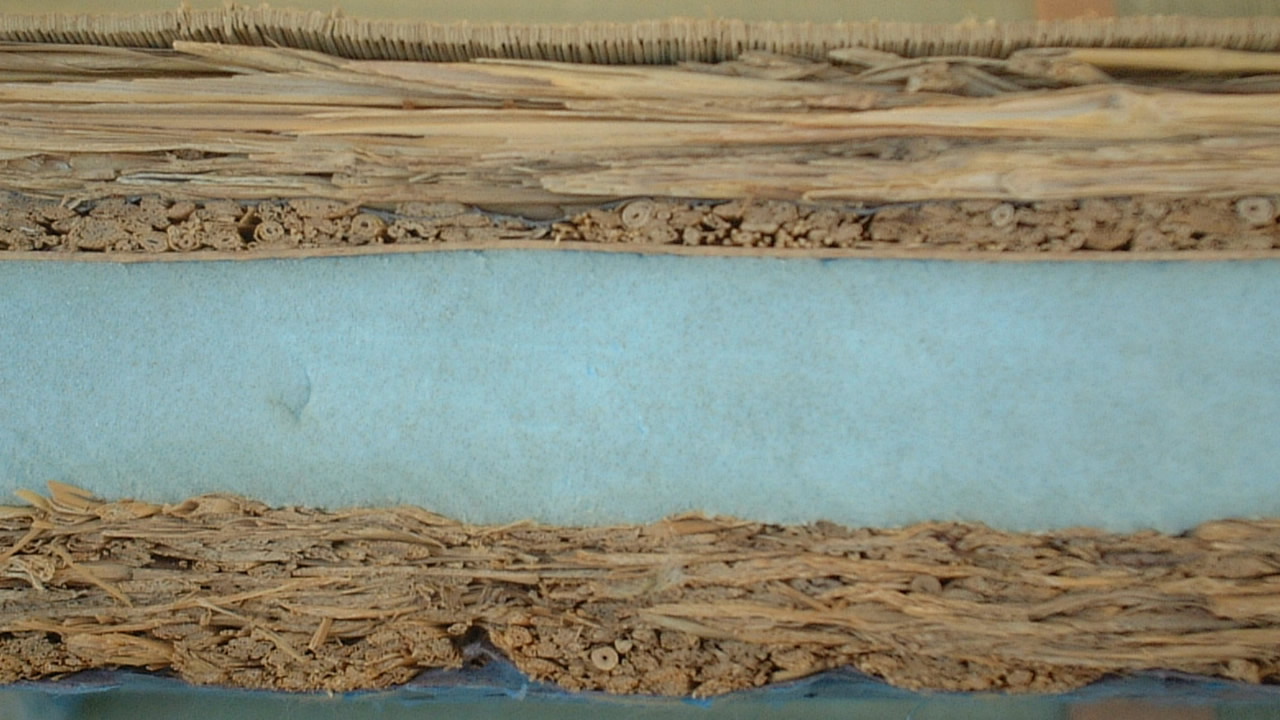
Cross-section of a modern tatami with an extruded polystyrene foam core

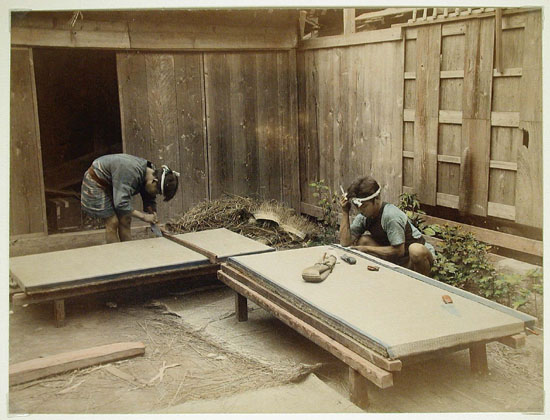
Making tatami mats, late 19th century

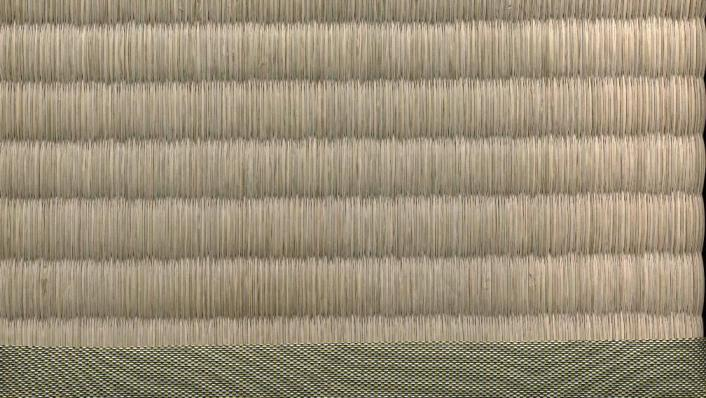
Close-up of mat surface and edging

== History ==
The term tatami is derived from the verb tatamu (畳む), meaning 'to fold' or 'to pile'. This indicates that the early tatami were thin and could be folded up when not used or piled in layers.

Tatami were originally a luxury item for the nobility. The lower classes had mat-covered earthen floors. During the Heian period, when the shinden-zukuri architectural style of aristocratic residences was consummated, the flooring of shinden-zukuri palatial rooms was mainly wooden, and tatami were used as seating only for the highest aristocrats.

In the Kamakura period, there arose the shoin-zukuri architectural style of residence for the samurai and priests who had gained power. This architectural style reached its peak of development in the Muromachi period, when tatami gradually came to be spread over whole rooms, beginning with small rooms. Floors completely covered with tatami came to be known as zashiki (座敷), lit. 'spread out for sitting', and rules concerning seating and etiquette determined the arrangement of the tatami in the rooms.

Before the mid-16th century, the ruling nobility and samurai slept on tatami or woven mats called goza (茣蓙), while commoners used straw mats or loose straw for bedding. Tatami were gradually popularized and reached the homes of commoners toward the end of the 17th century.

Houses built in Japan today often have few or no tatami-floored rooms. Having just one such room is common. Rooms having tatami flooring and other such traditional architectural features are referred to as nihonma or washitsu, "Japanese-style rooms".

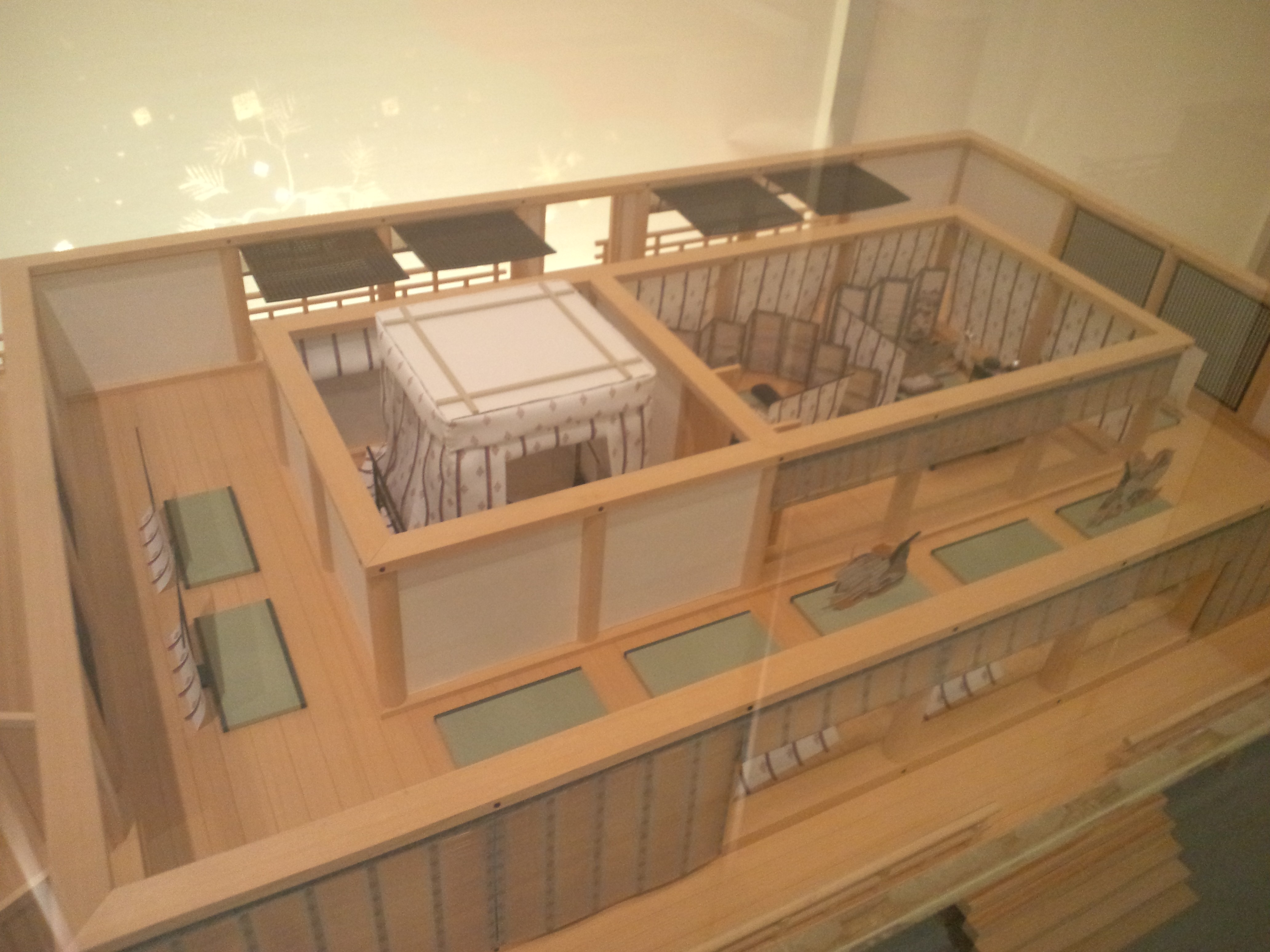
Green tatami in a museum model of the Saikū palace in ~the 9th century

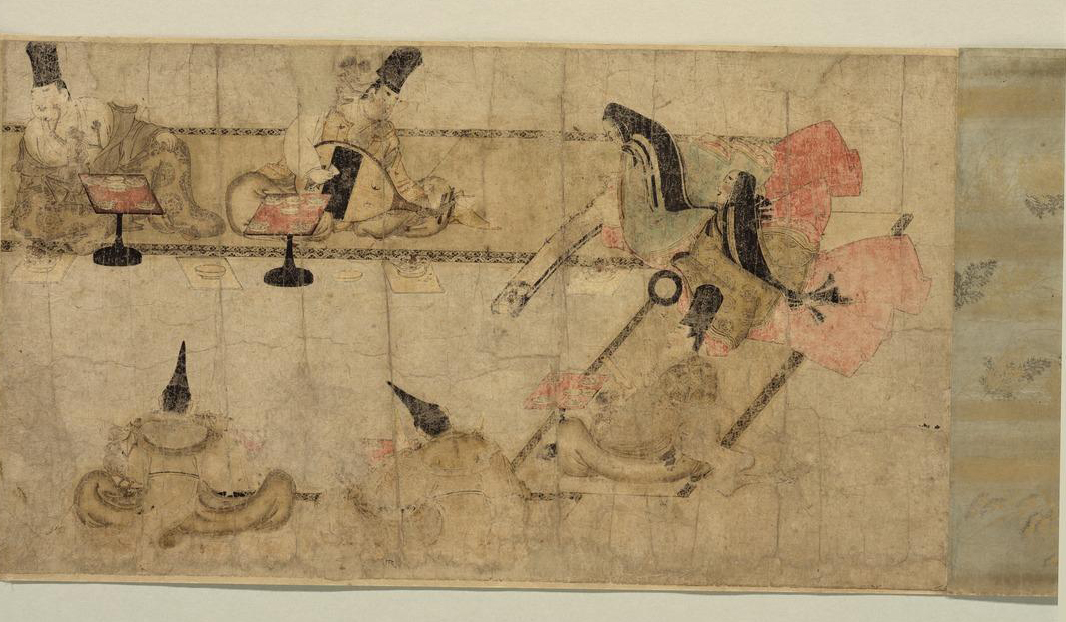
Courtiers making music, circa 1150–1200

As a dais, ~13th century

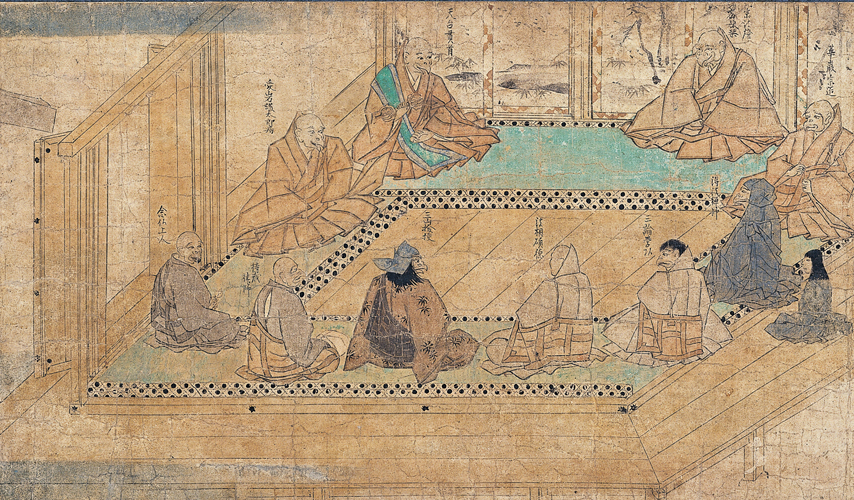
An almost-completely-covered floor in an illustration drawn in 1296

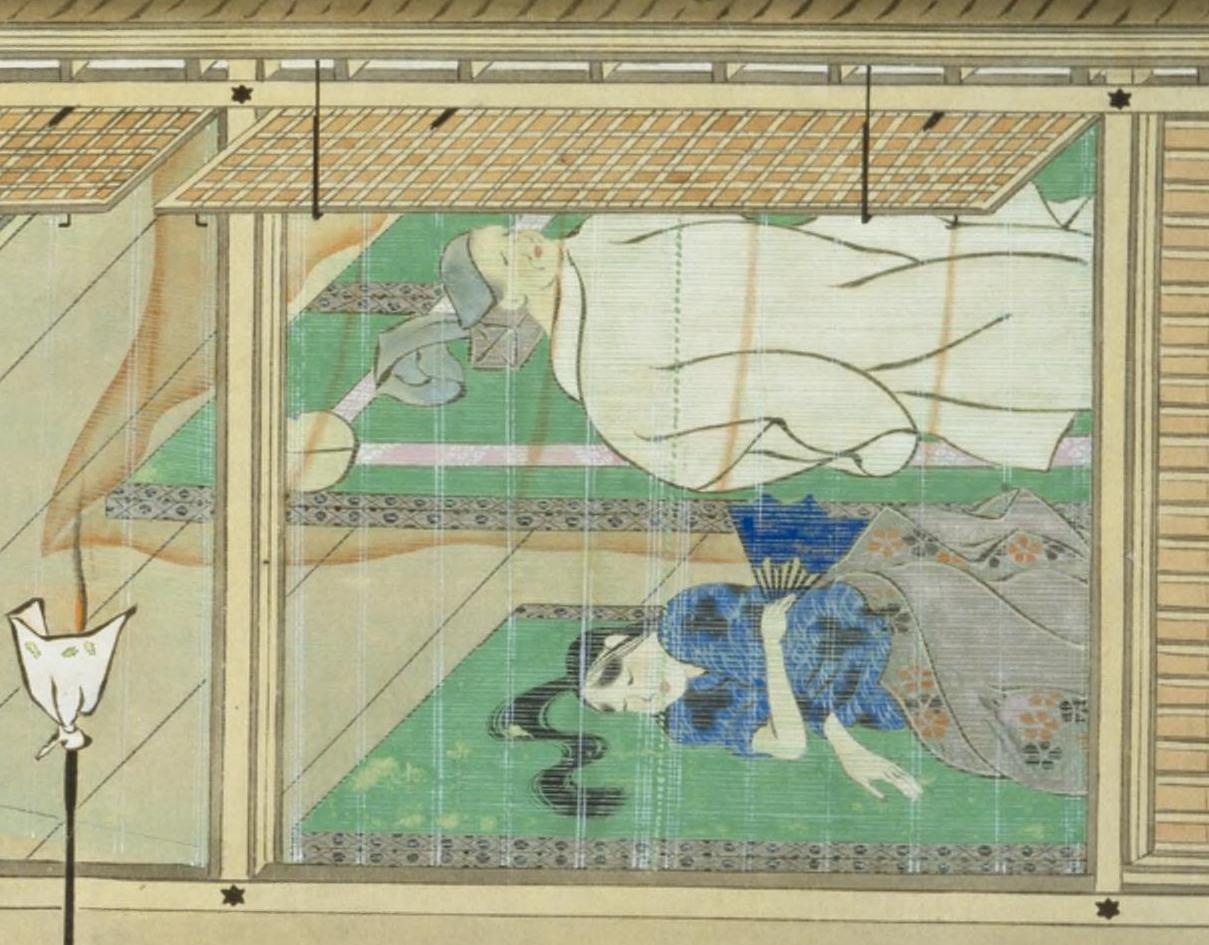
Tatami being used as sleeping mats, 1309 (see futon)

== Size ==
Tatami can be categorized by their size, correlated to their place of origin:

- Kyōma (京間) tatami: 1.91 by 0.955 m (6 ft 3.2 in by 3 ft 1.6 in), originated from Kyoto
- Chūkyōma (中京間) tatami: 1.82 by 0.91 m (6 ft 0 in by 3 ft 0 in), also called Ainoma (合の間; lit. "in-between" size) tatami, originated from Nagoya
- Edoma (江戸間) tatami: 1.76 by 0.88 m (5 ft 9 in by 2 ft 11 in), also called Kantōma (関東間) tatami, originated from Tokyo

In terms of traditional Japanese length units, a tatami is 1 by 0.5 ken, or equivalently 6 by 3 shaku. The length of these units varies regionally, which led different regions to develop separate tatami size conventions. One shaku is approximately the same length as one foot in the British-American measurement system. As for thickness, 5.5 cm (2.2 in) is average for Kyōma tatami, while 6.0 cm (2.4 in) is the norm for Edoma tatami.

A half mat is called a hanjō (半畳), and a mat of three-quarter length is called a daimedatami (大目畳 or 台目畳), which is used in tea-ceremony rooms (chashitsu).

In Japan, the size of a room is usually measured in relation to the size of tatami mats (-畳, -jō), about 1.653 m^{2} (17.79 sq ft) for a standard Nagoya-size tatami. Alternatively, in terms of traditional Japanese area units, room area (and especially house floor area) is measured in terms of tsubo, where one tsubo is the area of two tatami mats (forming a square); formally 1 by 1 ken or about 3.306 m^{2} (35.59 sq ft).

Some common room sizes in the Nagoya region are:

- 4 1/2 mats = 9 shaku × 9 shaku ≈ 2.73 m × 2.73 m (8 ft 11 in × 8 ft 11 in)
- 6 mats = 12 shaku × 9 shaku ≈ 3.64 m × 2.73 m (11.9 ft × 9.0 ft)
- 8 mats = 12 shaku × 12 shaku ≈ 3.64 m × 3.64 m (11.9 ft × 11.9 ft)

Shops were traditionally designed to be 5 1/2 mats, and Japanese tea rooms are frequently 4 1/2 mats.

Another format is the Ryūkyū (琉球) tatami, originating from the Ryūkyū Islands, which are square and can have various measurements. Ryūkyū tatami do not have borders, and have become popular in modern times for their simplicity.

== Layout ==
There are rules concerning the number of tatami mats and their layout in a room. In the Edo period, "auspicious" (祝儀敷き, shūgijiki) and "inauspicious" (不祝儀敷き, fushūgijiki) tatami arrangements were distinctly differentiated, with tatami rearranged depending on the occasion. In modern practice, the "auspicious" layout is normally used. In this arrangement, the junctions of the tatami form a "T" shape; in the "inauspicious" arrangement, the tatami are in a grid pattern wherein the junctions form a "+" shape. An auspicious tiling often requires the use of 1/2 mats to tile a room. It is NP-complete to determine whether a large room has an auspicious arrangement using only full mats.

An inauspicious layout was used to avoid bad fortune at inauspicious events such as funerals. Now it is widely associated with bad luck and itself avoided.

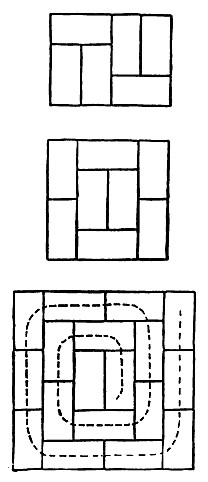
Some auspicious layouts from the early 1800s (Edo Period)

One possible auspicious layout of a 4 1/2 mat room
Half mat
Full mat

Typical layout of a 4 1/2 mat tea room in the cold season, when the hearth built into the floor is in use. The room has a tokonoma and mizuya dōko.

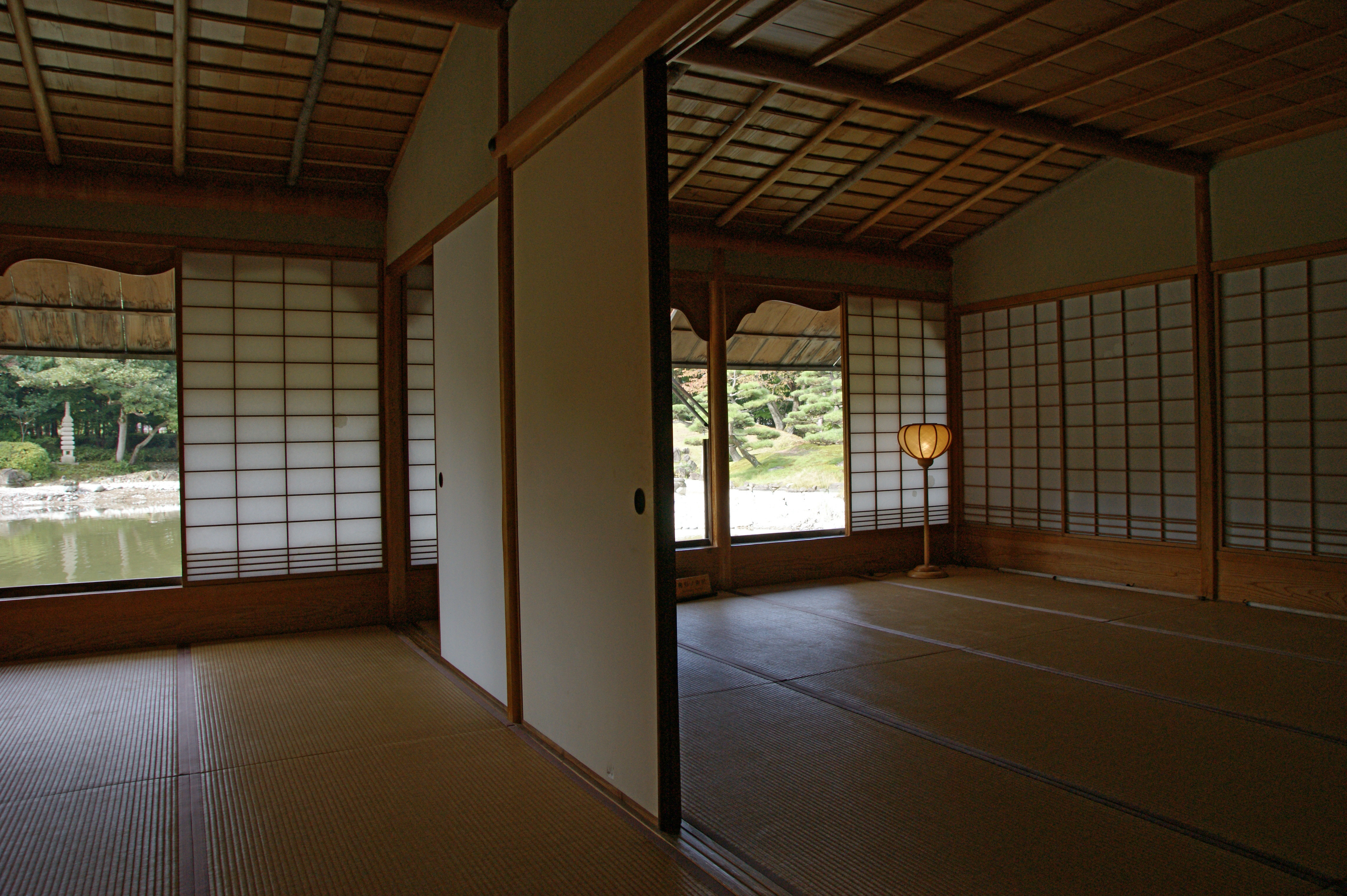
Room with tatami flooring in an inauspicious layout and paper doors (shōji)

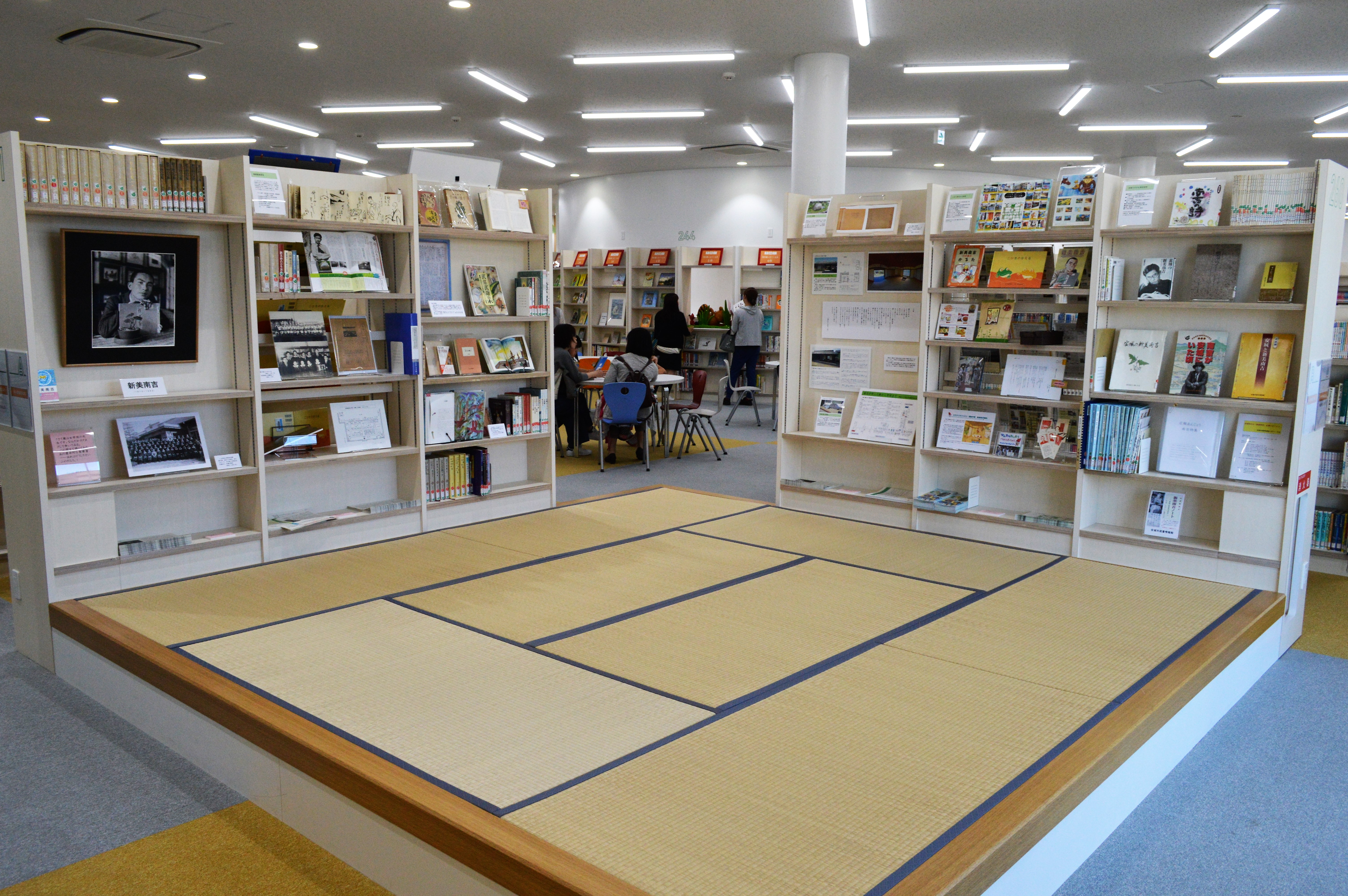
An auspicious layout

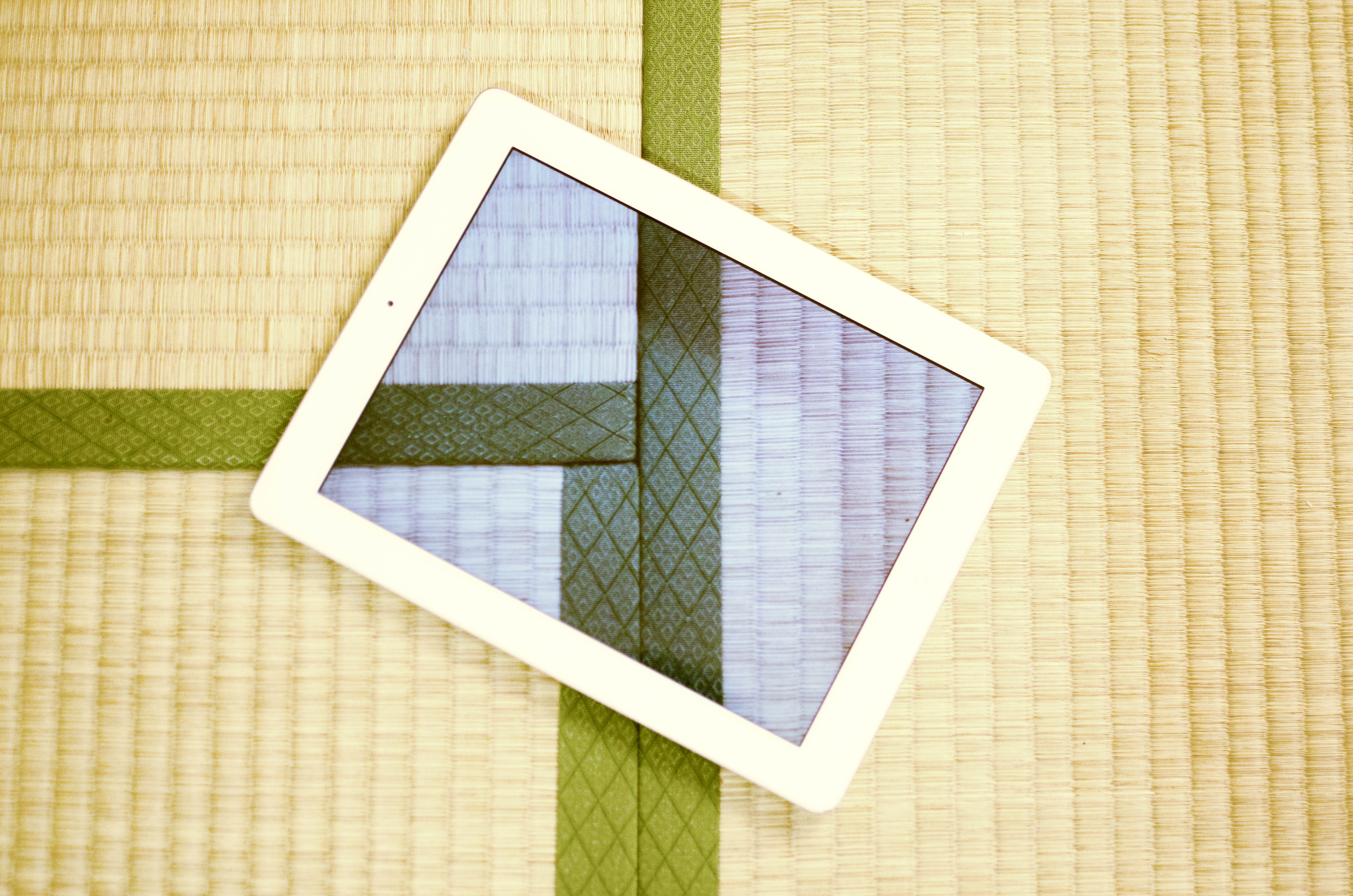
"T" shape

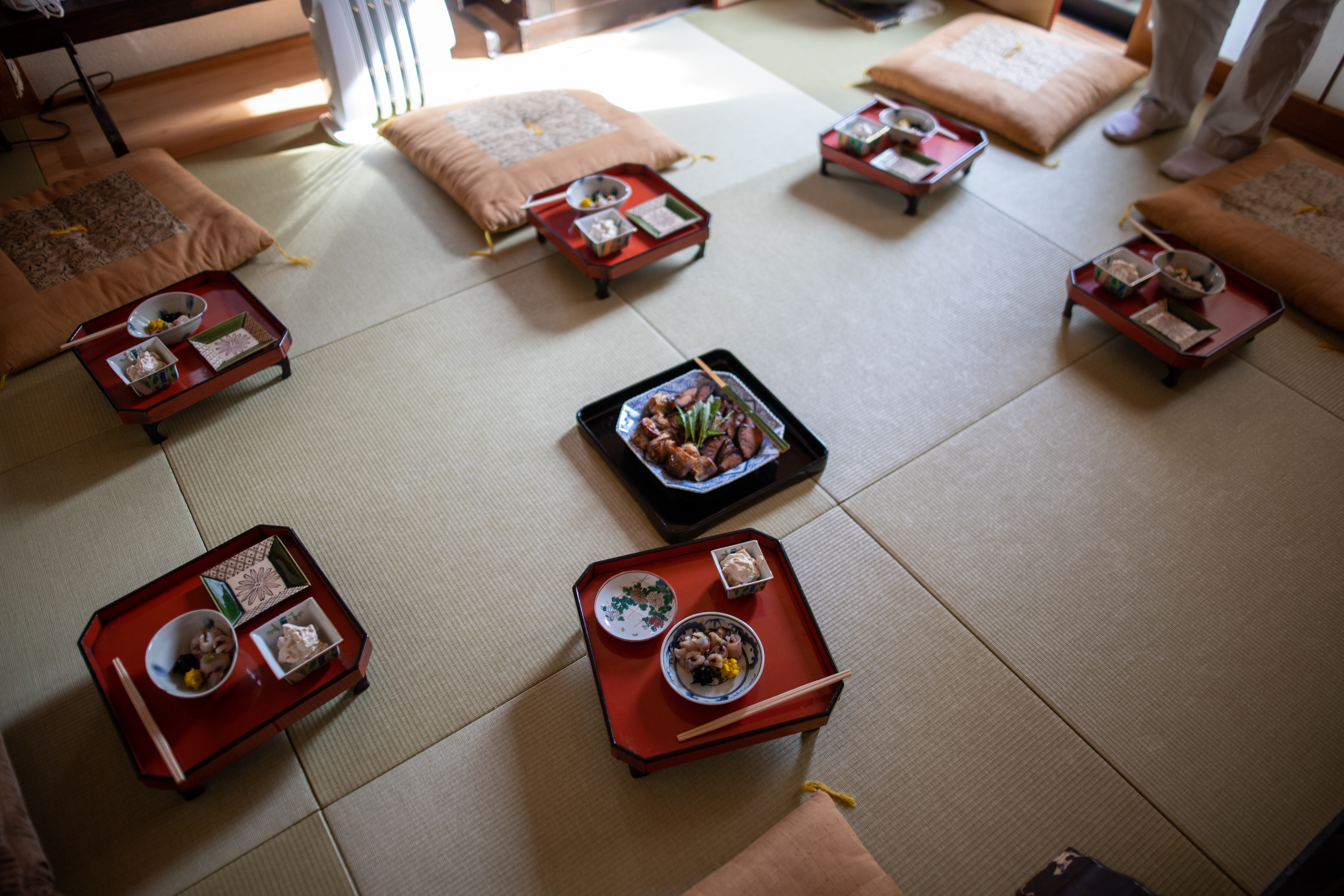
Ryūkyū tatami are square-shaped without borders.

== See also ==
- Higashiyama Bunka in Muromachi period
- Petate
- Tameshigiri
