= Aspidogastrida =

Scientific classification
- Kingdom: Animalia
- Phylum: Platyhelminthes
- Class: Trematoda
- Order: Aspidogastrida; Dollfus, 1958
- Superfamily: Aspidogastrioidea; Poche, 1907

Order of flukes

Aspidogastrida is an order of trematodes in the subclass Aspidogastrea.

== Families ==
- Superfamily Aspidogastrioidea Poche, 1907
  - Aspidogastridae Poche, 1907
  - Multicalycidae Gibson & Chinabut, 1984
  - Rugogastridae Schell, 1973
