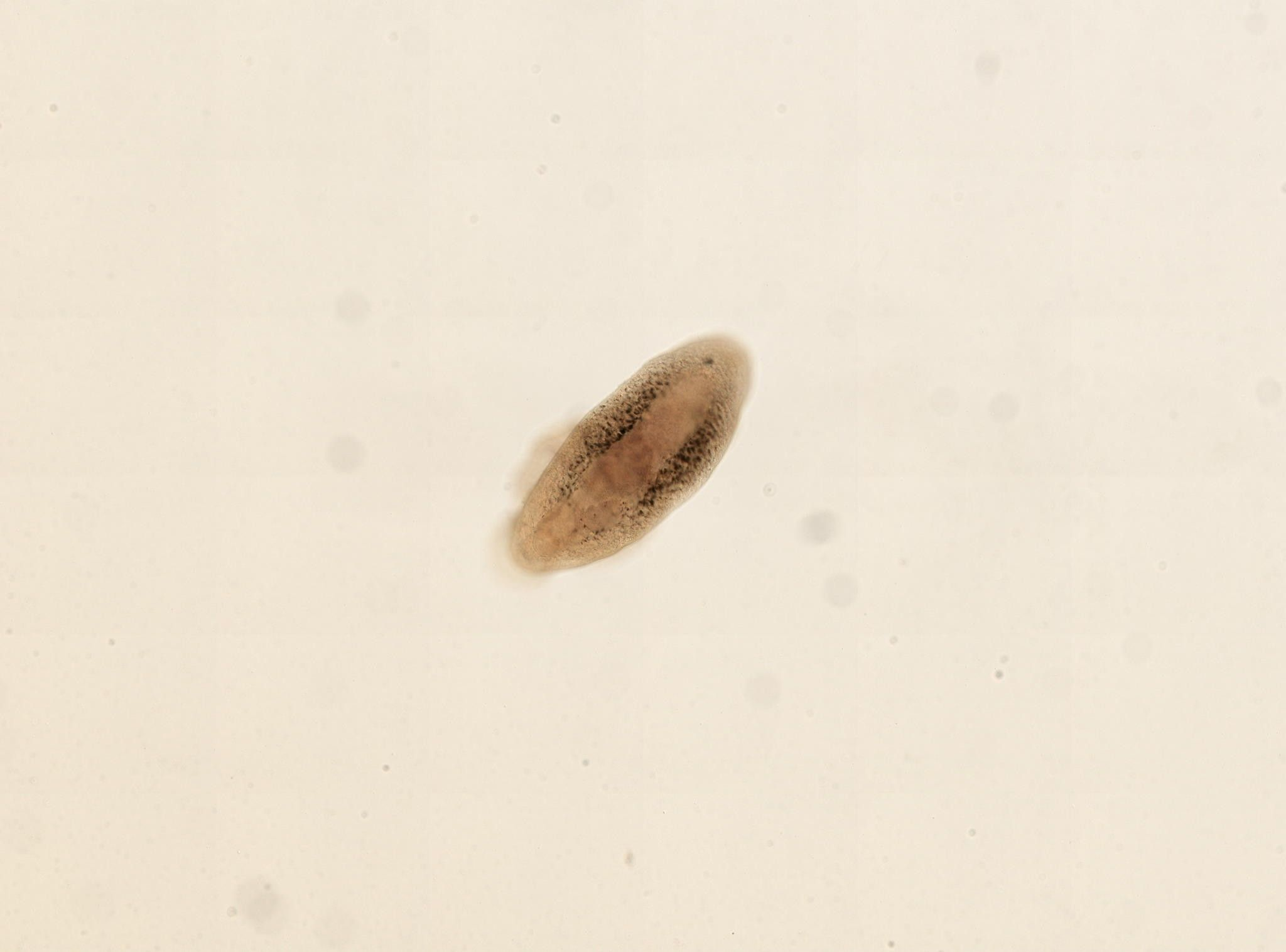

Scientific classification
- Kingdom: Animalia
- Phylum: Platyhelminthes
- Class: Trematoda
- Order: Aspidogastrida
- Superfamily: Aspidogastrioidea
- Family: Aspidogastridae; Poche, 1907

= Aspidogastridae =

Family of flukes

Aspidogastridae is a family of trematodes in the order Aspidogastrida.

== Genera ==
- Subfamily Aspidogastrinae Poche, 1907
  - Aspidogaster Baer, 1827
  - Lobatostoma Eckmann, 1932
  - Lophotapsis Looss, 1902
  - Multicotyle Dawes, 1941
  - Neosychnocotyle Snyder & Tkach, 2007
  - Sychnocotyle Ferguson, Cribb & Smales, 1999
- Subfamily Cotylaspidinae Chauhan, 1954
  - Cotylapsis Leidy, 1857
  - Cotylogaster Monticelli, 1892
  - Lissemysia Sinha, 1935
- Subfamily Rohdellinae Gibson & Chinabut, 1984
  - Rohdella Gibson & Chinabut, 1984
