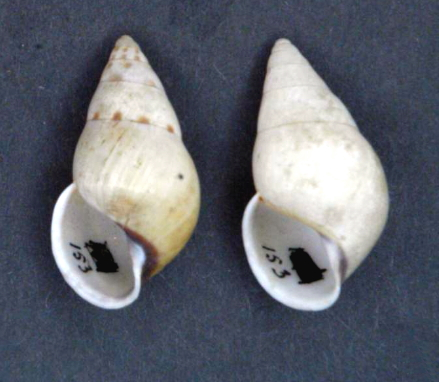
- Shell of Amphidromus semifrenatus (specimen at Naturalis Biodiversity Center)

Scientific classification
- Kingdom: Animalia
- Phylum: Mollusca
- Class: Gastropoda
- Order: Stylommatophora
- Family: Camaenidae
- Genus: Amphidromus
- Species: A. semifrenatus

Binomial name
- Amphidromus semifrenatus E. von Martens, 1900

Synonyms
- Amphidromus (Syndromus) semifrenatus E. von Martens, 1900 · alternative representation

= Amphidromus semifrenatus =

Species of mollusc

Amphidromus semifrenatus is a species of sinistral or dextral air-breathing tree snail, an arboreal gastropod mollusc in the family Camaenidae.

== Description ==
(Original description in German) This peculiar form, exhibiting characteristics intermediate between Amphidromus porcellanus and Amphidromus sumatranus, displays a slender shape akin to A. porcellanus, and certain individual specimens also present two rather broad brown bands on their underside. In contrast, the upper surface of the body whorl and the visible portion of the earlier whorls bear a greater resemblance to A. sumatranus, appearing pale greenish or bluish-white and featuring small pale brown spots arranged in one or two spiral rows. The body whorl typically exhibits a more vivid yellow coloration compared to the two aforementioned species. While its brown bands may more or less disappear, a narrow blackish-brown band invariably persists from the lowermost one, encircling the insertion point of the columellar margin and extending onto the outer surface of the outer lip to approximately half its height. Furthermore, entirely uniformly yellow individual specimens still reveal this dark brown columellar band and a corresponding dark brown stripe on the exterior, situated behind the reflection of the white lip — a feature absent in both A. sumatranus and A. porcellanus, based on the examination of the available specimens.

== Distribution ==
Indonesia, Sumatra Island.

== Habitat ==
In trees.
