= Bellamya trochlearis =

Conservation status
- Data Deficient (IUCN 3.1)

Scientific classification
- Kingdom: Animalia
- Phylum: Mollusca
- Class: Gastropoda
- Subclass: Caenogastropoda
- Order: Architaenioglossa
- Family: Viviparidae
- Genus: Bellamya
- Species: B. trochlearis

Binomial name
- Bellamya trochlearis von Martens, 1892

Synonyms
- Bellamya trochearis Martens, 1892 [orth. error]

Species of gastropod

Bellamya trochlearis is a species of large freshwater snail with a gill and an operculum, an aquatic gastropod mollusc in the family Viviparidae.

It was listed as Endangered species in 1996 IUCN Red list. It may be threatened by pollution, sedimentation and other human activities. Very little is known about this snail and it may be confused with Bellamya constricta.

== Distribution ==
This species is found in Kenya, Tanzania, and Uganda.
