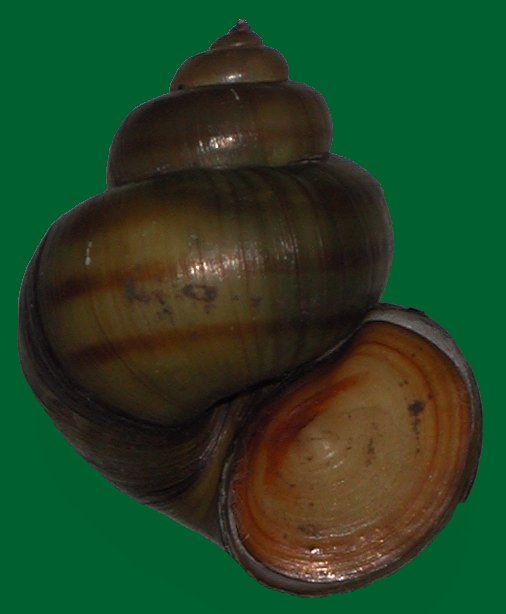
- Apertural view of a shell of Viviparus contectus with operculum in place

Scientific classification
- Kingdom: Animalia
- Phylum: Mollusca
- Class: Gastropoda
- Subclass: Caenogastropoda
- Order: Architaenioglossa
- Superfamily: Viviparoidea
- Family: Viviparidae
- Genus: Viviparus; Montfort, 1810

Type species
- Viviparus fluviorum Montfort, 1810

Synonyms
- Contectiana Bourguignat, 1880 (junior synonym); Contectiana (Contectiana) Bourguignat, 1880 (junior synonym); Paludina Férussac, 1812; Paludina (Vivipara) Montfort, 1810 (Paludina is a junior synonym of Viviparus); Vivipara (incorrect subsequent spelling)

= Viviparus =

Viviparus Temporal range: Jurassic–Recent

Genus of gastropods

Viviparus, commonly known as the river snails, is a genus of large, freshwater snails with an operculum, aquatic gastropod molluscs.

They are primitive members of the clade Caenogastropoda. The old name of the genus was Paludina.

== Distribution ==
This genus is palaearctic in distribution, and is known from the Jurassic to the Recent.

== Species ==
Viviparus belongs to the subfamily Viviparinae. Its taxonomy is currently under development and many of its species are often included in other related genera. It includes the following species:

- † Viviparus achatinoides (Deshayes, 1838)
- Viviparus acerosus (Bourguignat, 1862)
- † Viviparus aitaiensis Jekelius, 1932
- † Viviparus alexandrieni Cobălcescu, 1883
- † Viviparus altecarinatus Brusina, 1874
- † Viviparus altus Neumayr in Herbich & Neumayr, 1875
- † Viviparus alutae Jekelius, 1932
- † Viviparus ambiguus Neumayr in Neumayr & Paul, 1875
- † Viviparus ampullaceus (Bronn, 1831)
- † Viviparus aquitanicus (Benoist, 1873)
- † Viviparus argesiensis (Stefanescu, 1896)
- Viviparus ater (de Cristofori & Jan, 1832)
- † Viviparus atriticus Neumayr, 1869
- † Viviparus aulacophorus Brusina, 1874
- † Viviparus balatonicus Neumayr in Neumayr & Paul, 1875
- † Viviparus bazavlukensis (Datsenko, 2000)
- Viviparus bengalensis (Lamarck)
- † Viviparus berbestiensis Lubenescu & Zazuleac, 1985
- † Viviparus bergeroni (Stefanescu, 1896)
- Viviparus bermondianus (d'Orbigny, 1842)
- † Viviparus berthae Halaváts, 1914
- † Viviparus berti Cobălcescu, 1883
- † Viviparus bifarcinatus (Bielz, 1864)
- † Viviparus bogdanovi Brusina, 1897
- † Viviparus botenicus Lubenescu & Zazuleac, 1985
- † Viviparus botezi (Porumbaru, 1881)
- † Viviparus bressanus (Ogérien, 1867)
- † Viviparus brevis Tournouer, 1876
  - † Viviparus brevis trochlearis Tournouer, 1876
  - † Viviparus brevis forbesi Tournouer, 1876
  - † Viviparus brevis brevis Tournouer, 1876
  - † Viviparus brevis carinatus Tournouer, 1876
  - † Viviparus brevis gorceixi Tournouer, 1876
- † Viviparus brusinae Brusina, 1874
- † Viviparus bukowskii Oppenheim, 1919
- † Viviparus bulgaricus Brusina, 1902
- † Viviparus calverti Neumayr, 1880
- † Viviparus carenatus Lubenescu & Zazuleac, 1985
- † Viviparus cariniferus (J. De C. Sowerby, 1826)
- † Viviparus cerchesi Cobălcescu, 1883
- † Viviparus cibyraticus (Spratt & Forbes, 1847)
- † Viviparus clathratus (Deshayes in Geoffroy Saint-Hilaire et al., 1832)
- † Viviparus conicus Pavlović, 1903
- Viviparus contectus (Millet, 1813) - Lister's river snail
- † Viviparus contiguus (Stefanescu, 1896)
- † Viviparus courtelaryensis (Rollier, 1892)
- † Viviparus craiovensis (Tournouër, 1880)
- † Viviparus cretzestiensis (Pavlov, 1925)
- † Viviparus crytomaphora Brusina, 1874
- † Viviparus cucestiensis Lubenescu & Zazuleac, 1985
- † Viviparus cyrtomaphorus Brusina, 1874
- † Viviparus dacianus Lubenescu & Zazuleac, 1985
- † Viviparus darchiaci Pavlović, 1903
- † Viviparus dautzenbergi Brusina, 1902
- † Viviparus dehmi Schlickum & Strauch, 1979
- † Viviparus deleeuwi Neubauer, Harzhauser, Georgopoulou, Mandic & Kroh, 2014
- † Viviparus depressus Strausz, 1942
- † Viviparus dezmanianus Brusina, 1874
- † Viviparus diluvianus (Kunth, 1865)
- † Viviparus duboisi (Mayer, 1856)
- † Viviparus eburneus Neumayr, 1869
- † Viviparus egorlycensis Volkova, 1955
- † Viviparus elatiorpseudoturritus Bogachev, 1961
- † Viviparus etelkae Halaváts, 1914
- † Viviparus falconensis Lubenescu & Zazuleac, 1985
- † Viviparus falsani (Fischer in Falsan & Locard, 1867)
- † Viviparus ferratus (Quenstedt, 1884)
- † Viviparus fuchsi Neumayr, 1872
- Viviparus georgianus (I. Lea, 1834) - banded mystery snail
- † Viviparus getianus Lubenescu & Zazuleac, 1985
- † Viviparus gibbus (Sandberger, 1880)
- † Viviparus glacialis (S. Wood, 1872)
- † Viviparus globulosus (Serres, 1853)
- † Viviparus glockeri (Quenstedt, 1884)
- † Viviparus glogovensis (Stefanescu, 1896)
- Viviparus goodrichi Archer, 1933 - globose mysterysnail
- † Viviparus gracilis Lörenthey, 1894
- † Viviparus graciosus Jekelius, 1932
- † Viviparus grandis Neumayr in Herbich & Neumayr, 1875
- † Viviparus heberti Cobălcescu, 1883
- † Viviparus hectoris (Hoernes, 1877)
- Viviparus hellenicus Westerlund, 1886
- † Viviparus herbichi Neumayr in Herbich & Neumayr, 1875
- † Viviparus hoernesi Neumayr, 1869
- † Viviparus inflexus (Ludwig, 1865)
- Viviparus intertextus (Say, 1829) - rotund mysterysnail
- † Viviparus jalpuchensis (Datsenko in Gozhik & Datsenko, 2007)
- Viviparus japonicus Von Martens
- † Viviparus jarcae Cobălcescu, 1883
- † Viviparus karaganicus Volkova, 1955
- † Viviparus kaschpurica (Pavlov, 1925)
- † Viviparus kurdensis Lörenthey, 1894
- † Viviparus lacedaemoniorum Oppenheim, 1891
- † Viviparus leiostraca Brusina, 1874
- † Viviparus lignitarum Neumayr in Neumayr & Paul, 1875
- Viviparus limi Pilsbry, 1918 - Ochlockonee mysterysnail
- † Viviparus loczyi Halaváts, 1903
- † Viviparus lomejkoi Pavlović, 1932
- † Viviparus loxostomus (Sandberger, 1875)
- † Viviparus lubenescuae Neubauer, Harzhauser, Georgopoulou, Mandic & Kroh, 2014
- † Viviparus lungershauseni Bogachev, 1961
- † Viviparus macarovicii Lubenescu & Zazuleac, 1985
- Viviparus mamillatus (Küster, 1852)
- † Viviparus mammatus (Stefanescu, 1889)
- † Viviparus mandarinicus (Seninski, 1905)
- † Viviparus mangikiani Bogachev, 1961
- † Viviparus marnyanus Bogachev, 1961
- † Viviparus mazuranici Brusina, 1902
- † Viviparus megarensis Fuchs, 1877
- † Viviparus mehedintzensis Lubenescu & Zazuleac, 1985
- Viviparus monardi (Haas, 1934)
- † Viviparus monasterialis Fontannes, 1887
- † Viviparus monspesulanus Wenz, 1928
- † Viviparus motasi Papaianopol & Macaleț, 2004
- † Viviparus motruensis (Stefanescu, 1896)
- † Viviparus multicostatus (Seninski, 1905)
- † Viviparus murgescui Cobălcescu, 1883
- † Viviparus muscelensis (Stefanescu, 1897)
- † Viviparus neumayri Brusina, 1874
- † Viviparus neustruevi (Pavlov, 1925)
- † Viviparus nodosocostatus Halaváts, 1887
- † Viviparus nothus Brusina, 1874
- † Viviparus novskaensis Penecke, 1886
- † Viviparus oncophorae Rzehak, 1893
- † Viviparus oncophorus Brusina, 1874
- † Viviparus ornatus Neumayr in Neumayr & Paul, 1875
- † Viviparus ovidii Bogachev, 1961
- † Viviparus ovidiiformis (Datsenko in Gozhik & Datsenko, 2007)
- † Viviparus ovulum Neumayr in Neumayr & Paul, 1875
- † Viviparus pachystoma (Sandberger, 1859)
- † Viviparus pannonicus Neumayr in Neumayr & Paul, 1875
- † Viviparus pantanellii Wenz, 1919
- † Viviparus pauli Brusina, 1874
- † Viviparus phasianella (Boettger, 1887)
- † Viviparus pilari Brusina, 1874
- † Viviparus pollonerae Sacco, 1884
- † Viviparus praecursus (Tournouër, 1879)
- † Viviparus prahovensis Lubenescu & Zazuleac, 1985
- † Viviparus precraiovensis Lubenescu & Zazuleac, 1985
- † Viviparus prutulensis (Datsenko, 2002)
- † Viviparus pseudoachatinoides (Pavlov, 1925)
- † Viviparus pseudodezmanianus Lubenescu & Zazuleac, 1985
- † Viviparus pseudogracilis Strausz, 1942
- † Viviparus pseudomotruensis Bogachev, 1961
- † Viviparus pseudosadleri (Pavlov, 1925)
- † Viviparus pseudovukotinovici Jekelius, 1932
- † Viviparus pulchriformis Papp in Papp & Thenius, 1952
- Viviparus quadratus Benson, 1842
  - Viviparus quadratus disparis
- †’’ Viviparus recurrens’’ Penecke, 1886
- † Viviparus rhodensis Bukowski, 1892
- † Viviparus romaloi Cobălcescu, 1883
- † Viviparus rothi Lörenthey, 1906
- † Viviparus rudis Neumayr, 1869
- † Viviparus rumanus (Tournouër, 1879)
- † Viviparus sadleri Neumayr, 1869
- † Viviparus semseyi Halaváts, 1903
- † Viviparus serresi Wenz, 1928
- Viviparus sphaeridius (Bourguignat, 1880)
- † Viviparus spurius Brusina, 1874
- † Viviparus stefanescui (Stefanescu, 1896)
- † Viviparus stevanovici Neubauer, Harzhauser, Kroh, Georgopoulou & Mandic, 2014
- † Viviparus stricturatus Neumayr, 1869
- † Viviparus strossmayerianus Brusina, 1874
- † Viviparus sturi Neumayr, 1869
- † Viviparus subconcinnus (Sinzov, 1876)
- † Viviparus sublentus d'Orbigny, 1850
- Viviparus subpurpureus (Say, 1829) - olive mystery snail
- † Viviparus suessi Neumayr in Neumayr & Paul, 1875
- † Viviparus suessoniensis (Deshayes, 1826)
- † Viviparus suevicus Wenz, 1919
- † Viviparus sukljei Jenko, 1944
- † Viviparus symeonidisi Schütt, 1986
- † Viviparus syzranicus (Pavlov, 1925)
- † Viviparus tardyanus Locard, 1883
- † Viviparus teschi Meijer, 1990
- † Viviparus tohanensis Lubenescu & Zazuleac, 1985
- † Viviparus tomici Brusina, 1902
- † Viviparus transitorius (Stefanescu, 1889)
- † Viviparus treffortensis Delafond & Depéret, 1893
- Viviparus tricinctus Liu, Zhang & Wang, 1994
- † Viviparus tuberculatus Berdnikova, 1977
- † Viviparus tumidus Stefanescu, 1896
- † Viviparus turgidus (Bielz, 1864)
- † Viviparus uniangulatus (Hall, 1845)
- † Viviparus uva (Stefanescu, 1897)
- † Viviparus ventricosus (Sandberger, 1875)
- † Viviparus viminaticus Brusina, 1902
- † Viviparus vinodoli Koch, 1922
- Viviparus viviparus (Linnaeus, 1758) - river snail
- † Viviparus volgensis (Pavlov, 1925)
- † Viviparus vukotinovicii (Frauenfeld, 1862)
- † Viviparus wesselinghi Neubauer, Harzhauser, Georgopoulou, Mandic & Kroh, 2014
- † Viviparus wolfi Neumayr in Neumayr & Paul, 1875
- † Viviparus woodwardi Brusina, 1885
- † Viviparus zelebori Neumayr, 1869

=== Species brought into synonymy ===
- † Viviparus bifarcinatus stricturatus Neumayr, 1869: synonym of † Viviparus woodwardi Brusina, 1885
- † Viviparus dezmanianus dacicus Lubenescu & Zazuleac, 1985: synonym of † Viviparus dezmanianus turbureensis Fontannes, 1887
- † Viviparus incertus Macarovici, 1940: synonym of † Viviparus wesselinghi Neubauer, Harzhauser, Georgopoulou, Mandic & Kroh, 2014
- Viviparus malleatus Reeve, 1863 synonym of Cipangopaludina malleata (Reeve, 1863)
- † Viviparus rudis strossmayerianus Brusina, 1874: synonym of † Viviparus strossmayerianus Brusina, 1874
- † Viviparus woodwardi argesiensis (Stefanescu, 1896): synonym of † Viviparus argesiensis (Stefanescu, 1896)
