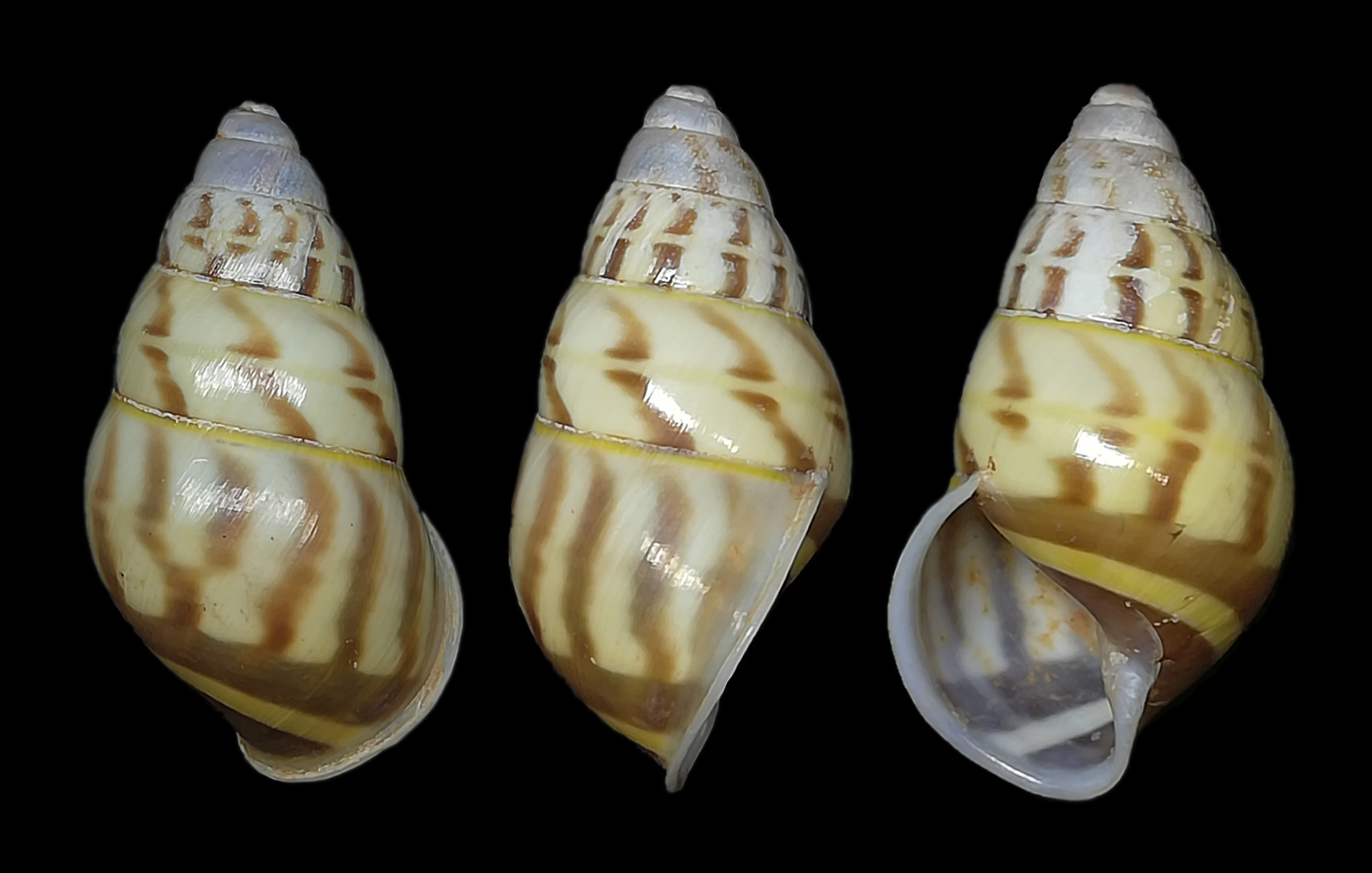

Scientific classification
- Kingdom: Animalia
- Phylum: Mollusca
- Class: Gastropoda
- Order: Stylommatophora
- Family: Camaenidae
- Genus: Amphidromus
- Species: A. sumatranus

Binomial name
- Amphidromus sumatranus Von Martens, 1864

Synonyms
- Amphidromus (Syndromus) sumatranus (E. von Martens, 1864) alternative representation; Bulimus sumatranus E. von Martens, 1864 superseded combination

= Amphidromus sumatranus =

Species of snail in the family Camaenidae

Amphidromus sumatranus is a species of air-breathing land snail, a terrestrial pulmonate gastropod mollusc in the family Camaenidae.

Subspecies

- Amphidromus sumatranus atjehensis B. Rensch, 1934
- Amphidromus sumatranus sumatranus (E. von Martens, 1864)
- Forma Amphidromus sumatranus f. jacobsoni Laidlaw, 1954: synonym of Amphidromus jacobsoni Laidlaw, 1954 (superseded rank)
- Amphidromus sumatranus jacobsoni Laidlaw, 1954: synonym of Amphidromus jacobsoni Laidlaw, 1954 (superseded rank)

== Description ==
The length of the shell attains 33 mm, its diameter 17 mm.

(Original description in Latin) The sinistral shell is elongate-conical. It exhibits a smooth and very glossy surface with a yellowish-white base color. It is painted with seriate brown spots and two to five brown bands at the base, and features a pale apex. Comprising six somewhat flat whorls, the shell possesses an ovate aperture that occupies three-sevenths of its length. The peristome appears somewhat thick, white, and expanded, lacking a parietal callus. The columellar margin is thin, rectilinear, and somewhat vertical, forming a distinct angle with the basal margin and being plainly adnate above.

== Distribution ==
This species is found in Sumatra Island, Indonesia.
