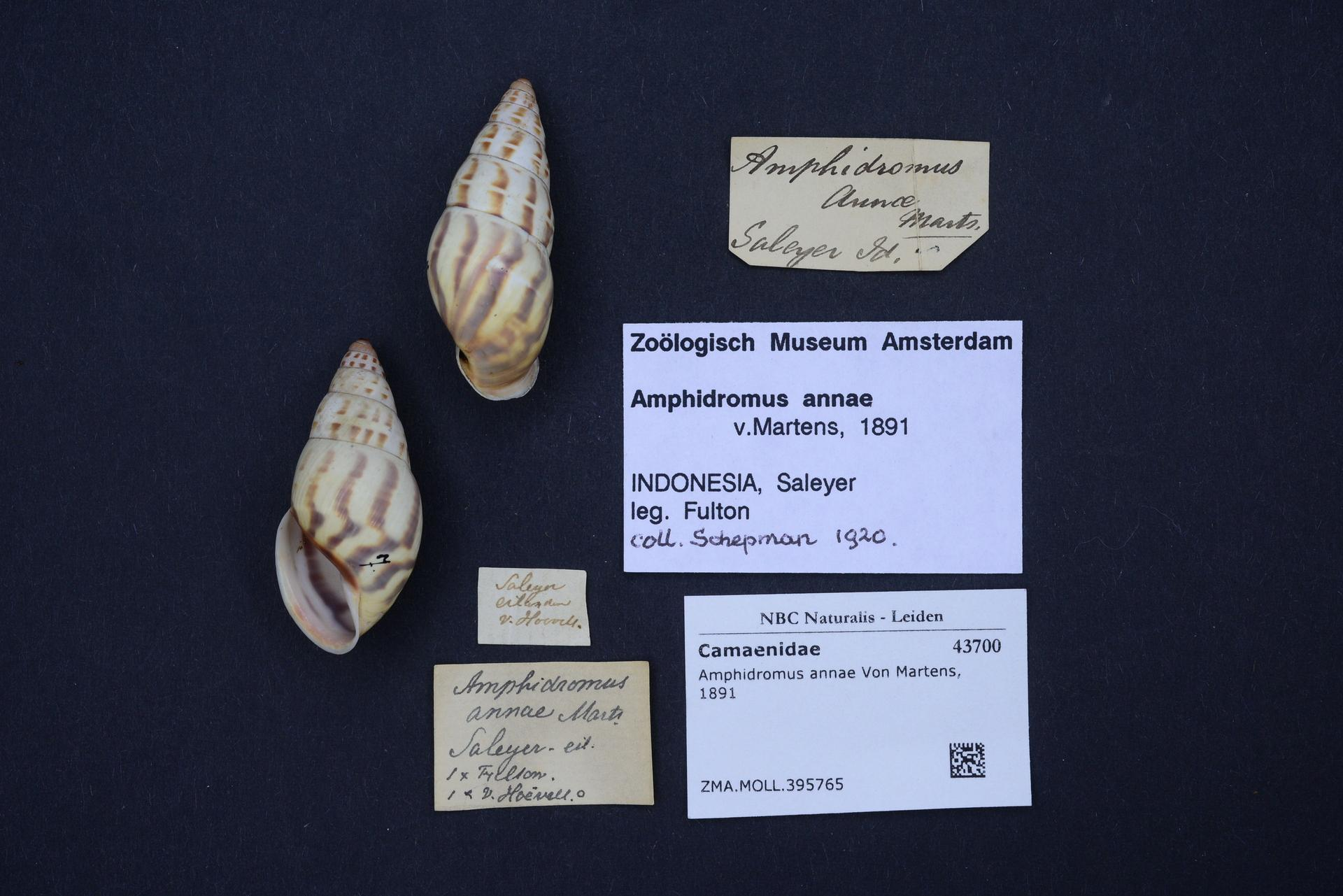
- Shell of Amphidromus annae (specimen at Naturalis Biodiversity Center)

Scientific classification
- Kingdom: Animalia
- Phylum: Mollusca
- Class: Gastropoda
- Order: Stylommatophora
- Family: Camaenidae
- Genus: Amphidromus
- Species: A. annae

Binomial name
- Amphidromus annae E. von Martens, 1891

Synonyms
- Amphidromus (Syndromus) annae E. von Martens, 1891 alternative representation

= Amphidromus annae =

Species of medium-sized air-breathing tree snail

Amphidromus annae is a species of medium-sized air-breathing tree snail, an arboreal gastropod mollusk in the family Camaenidae.

== Description ==
The length of the shell attains 44 mm, its diameter 17 mm.

(Original description in Latin) The sinistral shell is elongate-conical, rather thin, very slightly striated and somewhat glossy. It is pale yellow, painted with light brown streaks, which are continuous on the body whorl. The apex is black. The hell contains 7.5 somewhat flat whorls. Their suture is narrowly appressed. The aperture occupies 3/7 of the length. The apertural wall is covered with a rather wide reddish callus, palate pale, with transparent streaks. The whitish peristome is slightly thickened and expanded, its base slightly rose-tinted. The white columellar margin is rather wide and well distinguished from the parietal callus.

== Distribution ==
This species is endemic to Sulawesi, Indonesia.
