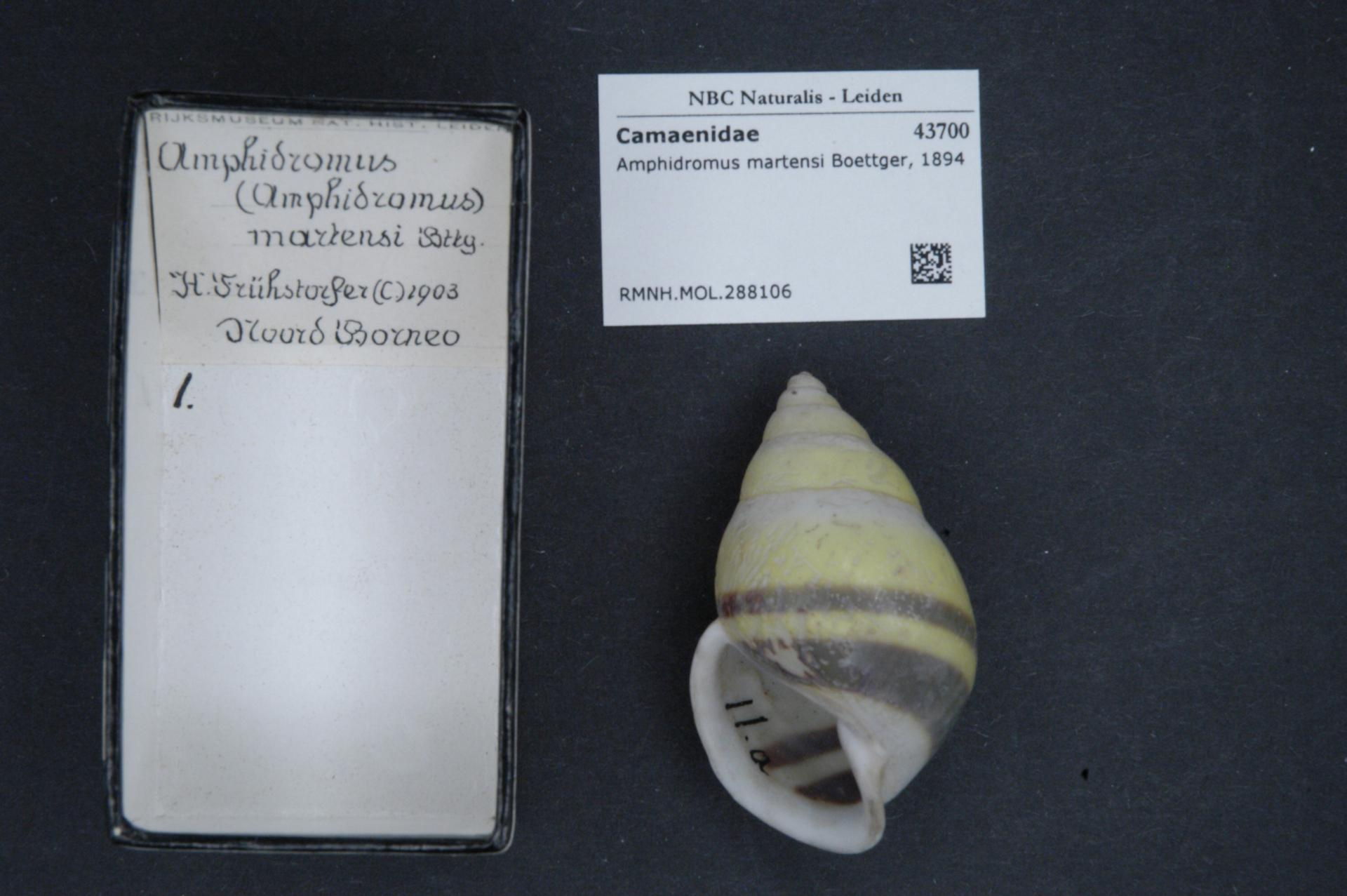
- Amphidromus martensi shell

Scientific classification
- Kingdom: Animalia
- Phylum: Mollusca
- Class: Gastropoda
- Order: Stylommatophora
- Family: Camaenidae
- Genus: Amphidromus
- Species: A. martensi

Binomial name
- Amphidromus martensi Boettger, 1894

Synonyms
- Amphidromus (Amphidromus) martensi O. Boettger, 1894 alternative representation

= Amphidromus martensi =

Species of gastropod

Amphidromus martensi is a species of air-breathing land snail, a terrestrial pulmonate gastropod mollusc in the family Camaenidae.

Subspecies

- Amphidromus martensi kecil Y.-Q. Wang, 2024
- Amphidromus martensi martensi O. Boettger, 1894
- Variety: Amphidromus martensi var. capistratus E. von Martens, 1903: synonym of Amphidromus capistratus E. von Martens, 1903 (original rank)

== Description ==
The length of the shell varies between 49 mm and 53 mm, its diameter between 27 mm and 30 mm.

(Original description in Latin) The shell is large, sinistral, and very shortly rimate (with a small, slit-like umbilicus), presenting a broadly conico-ovate shape and a very solid structure. Its surface appears very finely and densely striated, exhibiting a somewhat opaque quality and a bright lemon-yellow coloration. Broad white sutural and umbilical bands encircle the shell, and a single basal band adorns the (antepenultimate and) penultimate whorls. On the body whorl, two broad olive-green subperipheral bands are present, with the lower one being twice as wide. The shell lacks distinct varices. The spire rises in an elevated-conical form, with the right side being more convex and the apex displaying a pale pinkish-white hue. The shell contains six somewhat convex whorls separated by a distinct, appressed suture. The body whorl appears somewhat ventricose (swollen) and does not ascend anteriorly, almost exceeding half the height of the shell. The aperture is ear-shaped and white inside, featuring two obscure translucent bands and measuring eight-fifteenths the length of the shell. The peristome is white, thick, and callous, showing an equally broad expansion and reflection all around. Its margins are joined by a broad, white parietal callus, with the left margin being equally strongly curved and the columella appearing perpendicular, callous, and slightly twisted.

== Distribution ==
This species occurs on Sabah, Malaysia.
