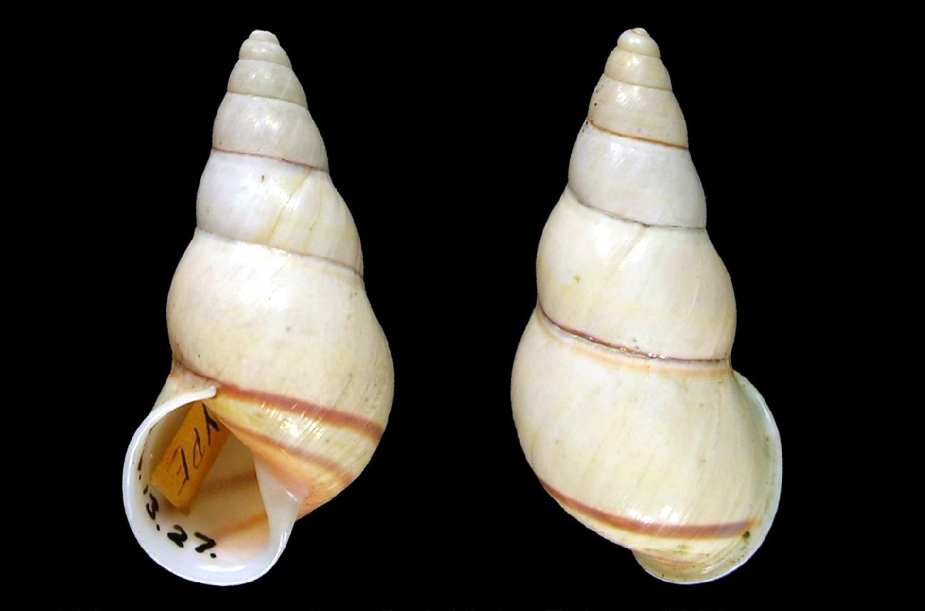
- Shell of Amphidromus suspectus albolabiatus (syntype at the Natural History Museum, London)

Scientific classification
- Kingdom: Animalia
- Phylum: Mollusca
- Class: Gastropoda
- Order: Stylommatophora
- Family: Camaenidae
- Genus: Amphidromus
- Species: A. suspectus

Binomial name
- Amphidromus suspectus (E. von Martens, 1864)

Synonyms
- Bulimus suspectus E. von Martens, 1864 superseded combination

= Amphidromus suspectus =

Species of tree snail

Amphidromus suspectus is a species of air-breathing tree snail, an arboreal gastropod mollusk in the family Camaenidae.

Subspecies

- Amphidromus suspectus albolabiatus Fulton, 1896

== Description ==
The length of this shell attains 31 mm, its diameter 17.5 mm

(Original description in Latin) The sinistral shell is ovate-conical, exhibiting a slightly striatulate and somewhat glossy surface with a yellowish-white base color. It is painted at the base with two black and two yellow bands, and features a pink umbilical region and a brownish-black apex. Comprising six somewhat convex whorls, the shell possesses an ovate aperture that occupies three-sevenths to four-ninths of its length. The peristome appears moderately thickened and shortly expanded, displaying a brownish-violet hue. The columellar margin is strongly dilated and reflected, showing a bifid (two-pronged) and paler appearance, and features a single tooth-like projection on the parietal callus at the outer angle.

== Distribution ==
This species is endemic to Timor Island.
