= Bellamya phthinotropis =

Conservation status
- Critically endangered, possibly extinct (IUCN 3.1)

Scientific classification
- Kingdom: Animalia
- Phylum: Mollusca
- Class: Gastropoda
- Subclass: Caenogastropoda
- Order: Architaenioglossa
- Family: Viviparidae
- Genus: Bellamya
- Species: B. phthinotropis

Binomial name
- Bellamya phthinotropis (Martens, 1892)

Species of snail

Bellamya phthinotropis is a species of large freshwater snail with a gill and an operculum, an aquatic gastropod mollusc in the family Viviparidae.

This species is found in Kenya, Tanzania, and Uganda. It was first described by Eduard von Martens in 1892.
