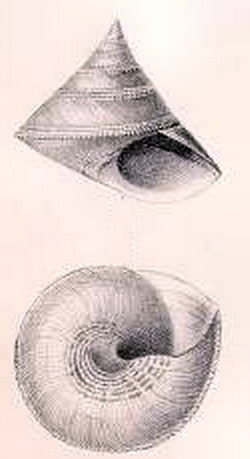
- Original drawing with two views of a shell of Calliostoma chuni

Scientific classification
- Kingdom: Animalia
- Phylum: Mollusca
- Class: Gastropoda
- Subclass: Vetigastropoda
- Order: Trochida
- Family: Calliostomatidae
- Genus: Calliostoma
- Species: C. chuni

Binomial name
- Calliostoma chuni (Martens, 1903)

Synonyms
- Trochus sublaevis var. chuni Martens, 1903

= Calliostoma chuni =

Species of gastropod

Calliostoma chuni is a species of sea snail, a marine gastropod mollusk in the family Calliostomatidae.

== Description ==
The height of the shell attains 31 mm.

== Distribution ==
This species occurs in the Indian Ocean off Somalia at a depth of 800 m.
