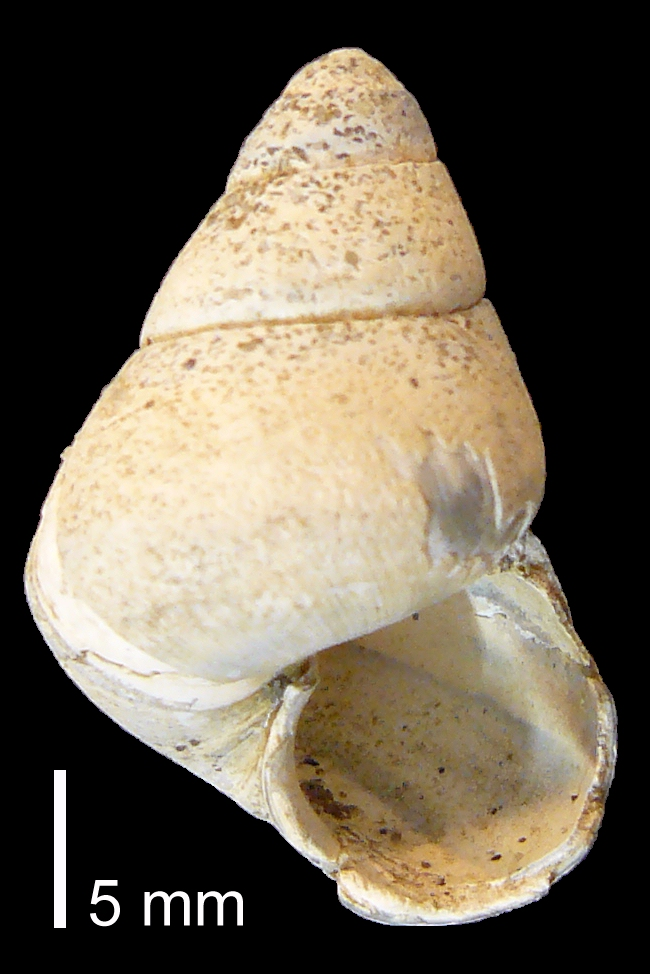
- The shell of Viviparus teschi from a borehole in Arnhem, Netherlands

Scientific classification
- Domain: Eukaryota
- Kingdom: Animalia
- Phylum: Mollusca
- Class: Gastropoda
- Subclass: Caenogastropoda
- Order: Architaenioglossa
- Family: Viviparidae
- Genus: Viviparus
- Species: V. teschi

Binomial name
- Viviparus teschi Meijer, 1990

= Viviparus teschi =

Viviparus teschi Temporal range: Pleistocene

Extinct species of gastropod

Viviparus teschi is an extinct species of freshwater snail with an operculum, an aquatic gastropod mollusk in the family Viviparidae, the river snails.

The specific name is in honor of Dutch geologist Pieter Tesch (1879-1961).

== Distribution ==
Type locality is in province Gelderland in the Netherlands.
