= Bellamya ecclesi =

Conservation status
- Critically Endangered (IUCN 3.1)

Scientific classification
- Kingdom: Animalia
- Phylum: Mollusca
- Class: Gastropoda
- Subclass: Caenogastropoda
- Order: Architaenioglossa
- Family: Viviparidae
- Genus: Bellamya
- Species: B. ecclesi

Binomial name
- Bellamya ecclesi (Crowley & Pain, 1964)

Species of gastropod

Bellamya ecclesi is a species of large freshwater snail with a gill and an operculum, an aquatic gastropod mollusc in the family Viviparidae. This species is found in Malawi and Mozambique. Its natural habitat is freshwater lakes.

It was previously listed as Endangered in 1996, in 2004 it was changed to Data Deficient, and in 2018 it was changed to Critically Endangered. It is threatened by fishing of Lake Malawi and by lakeside deforestation which may cause sedimentation through soil erosion. A small portion may be protected by one national park, in which fishing is not allowed.
