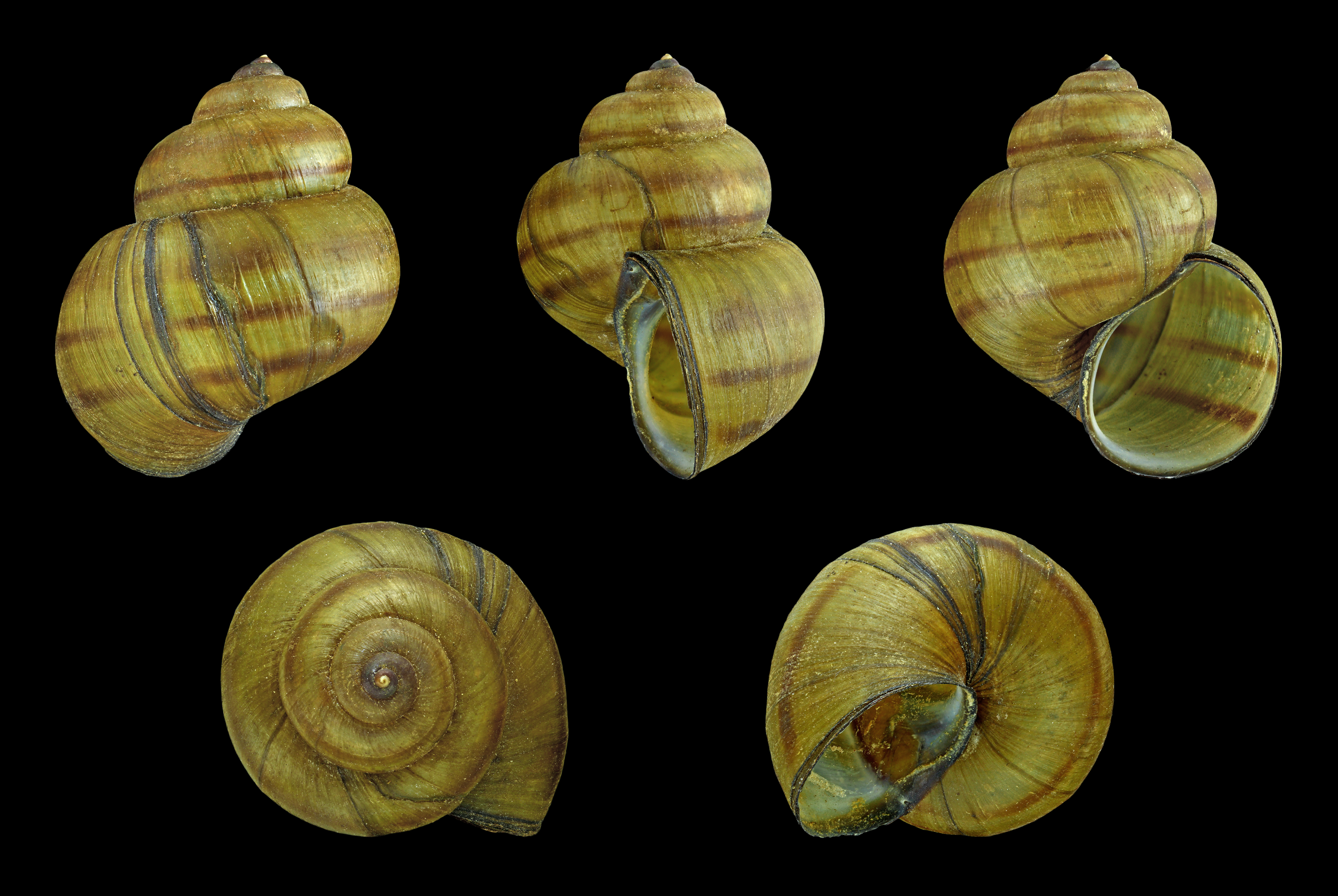
- Shell of Viviparus contectus

Conservation status
- Least Concern (IUCN 3.1)

Scientific classification
- Kingdom: Animalia
- Phylum: Mollusca
- Class: Gastropoda
- Subclass: Caenogastropoda
- Order: Architaenioglossa
- Family: Viviparidae
- Genus: Viviparus
- Species: V. contectus

Binomial name
- Viviparus contectus (Millet, 1813)

Synonyms
- Contectiana contecta (Millet, 1813); Cyclostoma contectum (Millet, 1813); Cyclostoma viviparum Draparnaud, 1801; Helix vivipara Linnaeus, 1758; Nerita vivipara O. F. Müller, 1774; Paludina contecta Moquin-Tandon, 1855; Paludina contecta Millet, 1813; Paludina fasciata (Stein, 1850); Paludina listeri Forbes et Hanley, 1853; Paludina vivipara Lamarck, 1835

= Viviparus contectus =

Species of gastropod

Viviparus contectus, common name Lister's river snail, is a species of large, freshwater snail with an operculum and a gill, an aquatic gastropod mollusk in the family Viviparidae, the river snails.

== Distribution ==
This is not a native of the UK. This species is palaearctic in distribution, specifically Europe and western Siberia, including:

- Great Britain, specifically eastern England
- Netherlands
- Germany - endangered (3 gefährdet)
- Austria
- Czech Republic - near threatened (NT)
- Slovakia
- Russia - Sverdlovsk oblast

== Habitat ==
This large snail lives in slow flowing rivers and canals which are unpolluted, and which have hard water with many water weeds.
