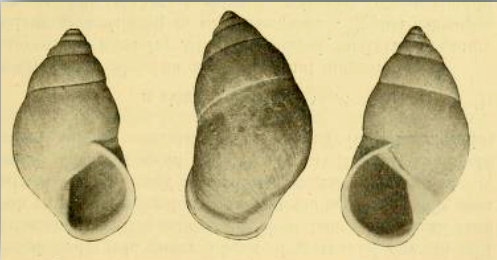
- Shell of Amphidromus capistratus (holotype)

Scientific classification
- Kingdom: Animalia
- Phylum: Mollusca
- Class: Gastropoda
- Order: Stylommatophora
- Family: Camaenidae
- Genus: Amphidromus
- Species: A. capistratus

Binomial name
- Amphidromus capistratus E. von Martens, 1903

Synonyms
- Amphidromus (Amphidromus) capistratus E. von Martens, 1903 alternative representation; Amphidromus martensi var. capistratus E. von Martens, 1903 (original rank)

= Amphidromus capistratus =

Species of tree snail

Amphidromus capistratus is a species of air-breathing tree snail, an arboreal gastropod mollusk in the family Camaenidae.

Subspecies

- Amphidromus capistratus capistratus E. von Martens, 1903
- Amphidromus capistratus chuai J. Parsons, 2018

== Description ==
The length of this sinister shell varies between 39 mm and 47 mm, its diameter between 23 mm and 25.5 mm.

(Original description in Latin) The shell is fusiform ovate. It is yellow, with a rather narrow white sutural band, and an olive-green basal band on the body whorl, and streaks of the same color behind the aperture, both angularly joined. The aperture's height nearly equals the shell's length.

== Distribution ==
This species is endemic to Eastern Borneo.
