= Bellamya liberiana =

Conservation status
- Critically Endangered (IUCN 3.1)

Scientific classification
- Kingdom: Animalia
- Phylum: Mollusca
- Class: Gastropoda
- Subclass: Caenogastropoda
- Order: Architaenioglossa
- Family: Viviparidae
- Genus: Bellamya
- Species: B. liberiana

Binomial name
- Bellamya liberiana (Schepman, 1888)

Synonyms
- Paludina liberiana Schepman, 1888; Potadoma liberiana (Schepman, 1888)

Species of gastropod

Bellamya liberiana is a species of operculate freshwater snail, an aquatic gastropod mollusc in the family Viviparidae, the river snails or mystery snails. This species is endemic to Liberia.
