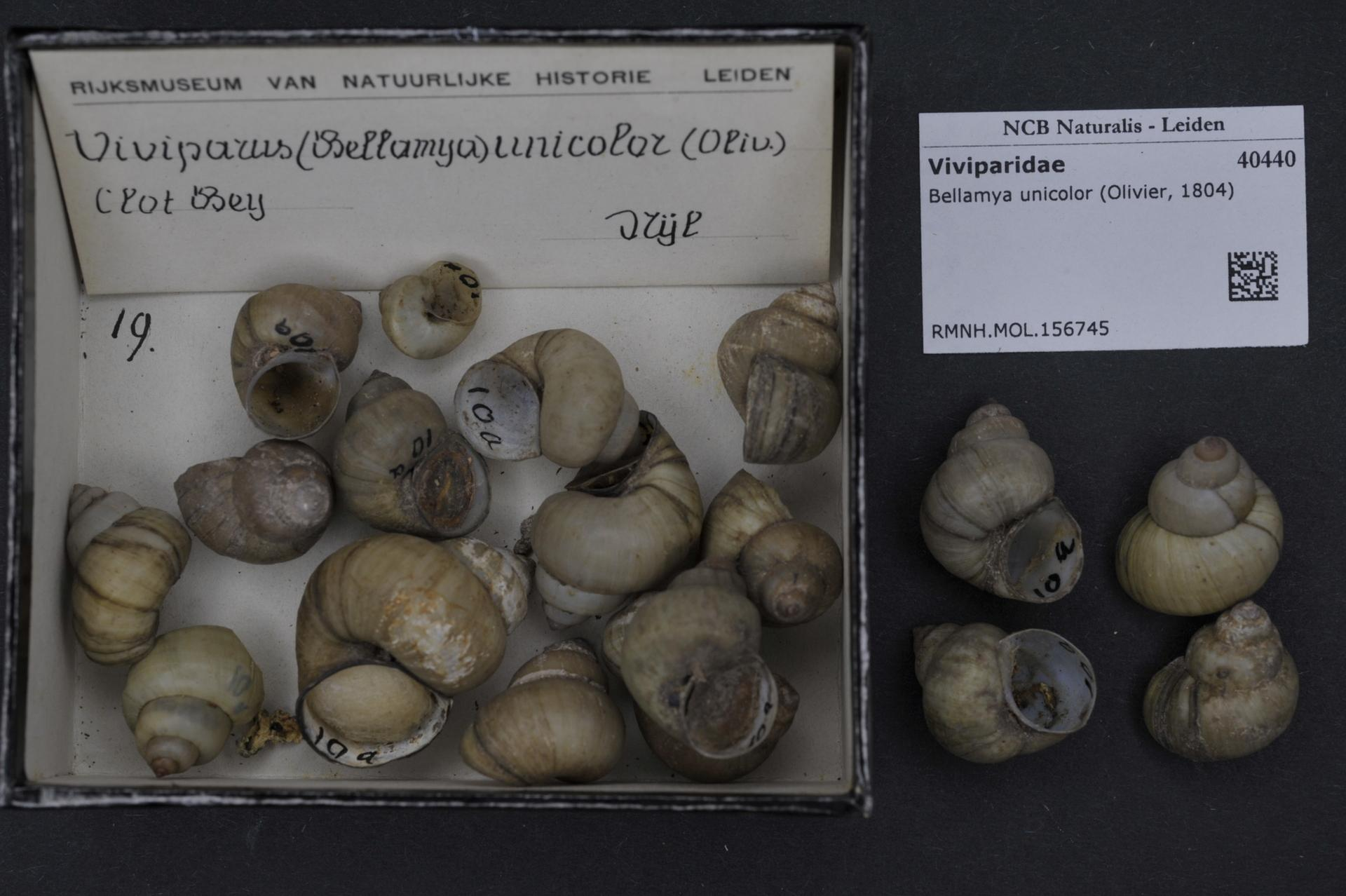
- Bellamya unicolor shells

Scientific classification
- Kingdom: Animalia
- Phylum: Mollusca
- Class: Gastropoda
- Subclass: Caenogastropoda
- Order: Architaenioglossa
- Superfamily: Viviparoidea
- Family: Viviparidae
- Genus: Bellamya; Jousseaume, 1886

Type species
- Bellamya bellamya Jousseaume, 1886

Synonyms
- Viviparus (Bellamya) Jousseaume, 1886

= Bellamya (gastropod) =

Genus of gastropods

Bellamya is a genus of freshwater snails with a gill and an operculum, aquatic gastropod mollusks in the family Viviparidae.

Bellamya is the type genus of the subfamily Bellamyinae.

== Distribution ==
The indigenous distribution of Bellamya includes Africa and Asia.

== Species ==
Species within the genus Bellamya include:

- Bellamya alberti (Cox, 1926) †
- Bellamya beijiangensis Yü & Zhang, 1982 †
- Bellamya campaniformis Bickel, 1976 †
- Bellamya capillata (Frauenfeld, 1865)
- Bellamya celsispiralis Gurung, Takayasu & Matsuoka, 1997 †
- Bellamya constricta (Martens, 1889)
- Bellamya contracta (Haas, 1934)
- Bellamya crassispiralis Annandale, 1921
- Bellamya crawshayi (Smith, 1893)
- Bellamya dagangensis Youluo, 1978 †
- Bellamya dissimilis (Mueller, 1774)
- Bellamya ecclesi (Crowley & Pain, 1964)
- Bellamya heudei guangdungensis (Kobelt, 1906)
- Bellamya hilmandensis (Kobelt, 1909)
- Bellamya jeffreysi (Frauenfeld, 1865)
- Bellamya jiangyouensis Yü, 1974 †
- Bellamya kowiayiensis (Brazier, 1886)
- Bellamya kweilinensis (Hsü, 1935) †
- Bellamya leopoldvillensis (Putzeys, 1898)
- Bellamya liberiana (Schepman, 1888)
- Bellamya micron Annandale, 1921
- Bellamya monardi (Haas, 1934)
- Bellamya mweruensis (Smith, 1893)
- Bellamya orlovi (Lindholm, 1932) †
- Bellamya pagodiformis (Smith, 1893)
- Bellamya phthinotropis (Martens, 1892)
- Bellamya retusa (Meek & Hayden, 1856) †
- Bellamya robertsoni (Frauenfeld, 1865)
- Bellamya rubicunda (Martens, 1879)
- Bellamya suzukii Matsuoka, 1985 †
- Bellamya tenuisculpta (von Martens, 1874) †
- Bellamya trochlearis (Martens, 1892)
- Bellamya unicolor (Olivier, 1804) - Bellamya duponti De Rochebrune, 1882 is the type species and it is probably synonym of Bellamya unicolor

synonyms

- Bellamya bengalensis (Lamarck, 1822): synonym of Filopaludina bengalensis (Lamarck, 1822)
- Bellamya chinensis (Reeve 1863): synonym of Cipangopaludina chinensis (Gray, 1834) - Chinese mystery snail
- Bellamya costulata (Martens, 1892): synonym of Bellamya constricta (von Martens, 1889) (a junior synonym)
- Bellamya crassa (Benson, 1836): synonym of Mekongia crassa (Benson, 1836) (a junior synonym)
- Bellamya jucunda (Smith, 1892): synonym of Bellamya constricta (von Martens, 1889) (a junior synonym)
- Bellamya manhongensis Zhang, Liu & Wang, 1981: synonym of Sinotaia manhongensis (W.-Z. Zhang, Y.-F. Liu & Y.-X. Wang, 1981) (original combination)
