= Viviparus georgianus =

- A shell of Viviparus georgianus

Conservation status
- Secure (NatureServe)

Scientific classification
- Kingdom: Animalia
- Phylum: Mollusca
- Class: Gastropoda
- Subclass: Caenogastropoda
- Order: Architaenioglossa
- Family: Viviparidae
- Genus: Viviparus
- Species: V. georgianus

Binomial name
- Viviparus georgianus (I. Lea, 1834)

Synonyms
- Paludina georgiana (basionym) Callinina georgiana (Lea, 1834)

Species of gastropod

Viviparus georgianus, common name the banded mystery snail, is a species of large freshwater snail with gills and an operculum, an aquatic gastropod mollusk in the family Viviparidae, the river snails.

This snail is native to the southeastern United States. The specific epithet georgianus is a reference to the southern State of Georgia, where the type locality is situated.

== Original description ==
Viviparus georgianus was originally discovered and described (under the name Paludina georgiana) by Isaac Lea in 1834.

Lea's original text (the type description) reads as follows:

Paludina Georgiana. Plate XIX. fig 85

Testa ventricoso-conoided, tenui, tenebroso-cornea, lævi; suturis valde iinpressis; anfractibus instar quinis, convexis; aperturâ subrotundatâ, albâ.

Shell ventricoso-conical, thin, dark horn coloured, smooth; sutures very much impressed; whorls about five, convex; aperture nearly round, white.

Hab. Hopeton, near Darien, Georgia. Professor Shepard.

My Cabinet.

Cabinet of Professor Shepard.

Diam. • 7, Length 1•1 inches.

Remarks.—This species, in form, resembles most, perhaps, the P. vivipara. It is not quite so large, nor has it bands. It is rather more elevated, and the body whorl is smaller and rounder than the P. decisa (Say). The aperture at the base recedes more than is usual with this genus.

== Ecology ==
=== Habitat ===
This snail is found in lakes and slow-moving rivers with mud bottoms. The species thrives in eutrophic lentic environments such as lakes, ponds and some low-flow streams. It is usually absent from larger, faster flowing rivers; however, it is able to survive conditions of high water velocity in the St. Lawrence River, and in the United States it may even be better adapted than the introduced species Bithynia tentaculata to such habitats.

Individuals are generally found in a range of habitats, including: regions with silt and mud substrate; communities dominated by diatoms and filamentous algae (not blue-green algae); shallow waters with sand or gravel substrate; soft and hard water; water with pH between 6.3 and 8.5; freshwater habitats only; river reaches more than meanders.

Viviparus georgianus breeds and lives in shallow waters, often amongst macrophytes, in spring to fall, then moves out to deeper areas in the fall in order to overwinter away from shore. In more open waters, fall migration begins earlier than in smaller lakes and ponds. Most growth generally occurs when waters become warmer in spring and summer, although reduced growth continues in winter.

=== Life cycle ===
It is dioecious (it has two distinct sexes), iteroparous (reproducing more than once in a lifetime) and ovoviviparous, laying eggs singly in albumen-filled capsules. Females generally brood eggs for 9–10 months. Fecundity is generally between 4 and 81 young per female, but on average is closer to 11 young/female. Females can brood more than one batch of young at a time, and the number of young in one brood is positively related to the size of the female. Reproductive females are usually larger than 16 mm. Female banded mystery snails live 28–48 and males live 18–36 months.

=== Feeding habits ===
Viviparus georgianus is known to be a facultative or even obligate filter-feeding detritivore. Because of this, it can be used as a bioindicator of sediment contamination by oil and fertilizer, because its growth, survival and histology are significantly affected by the ingestion of contaminated sediments.

This species grazes on diatom clusters found on silt and mud substrates, but it may also require the ingestion of some grit, in order to be able to break down algae.

The banded mystery snail often lives at high densities, sometimes up to around 864/m^{2}.

=== Parasites ===
This snail is host to many parasites in its native habitat, including cercaria, metacercaria, ciliated protozoans, annelids, and chironomid larvae.

== Distribution ==
=== Indigenous distribution ===
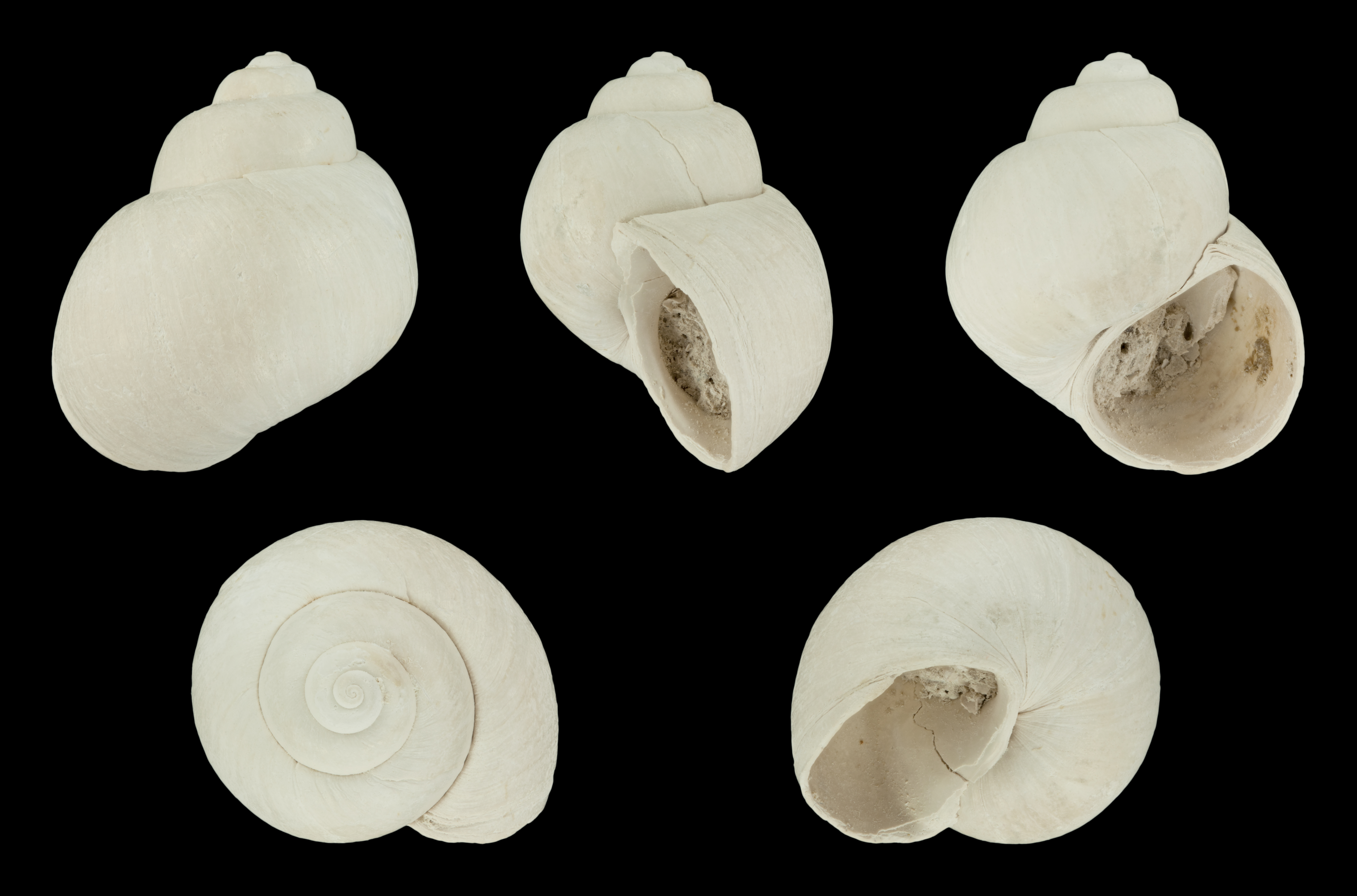
Fossil specimen from the Lower Pleistocene, Florida

The banded mystery snail is native to North America, generally found from the northeastern United States to Florida and the Gulf of Mexico primarily in south central Florida, Georgia, Alabama and north, mainly in the Mississippi River system, to Illinois and northwestern Indiana. Massachusetts, Indiana and Connecticut are probably some of the states marking the northern limit of this species' native range.

A recent study found that Viviparus georgianus is in fact not one species, but a species complex in North America. It was determined that Viviparus limi is native to the Ochlockonee River and southwestern Georgia, while Viviparus goodrichi lives in the Florida panhandle and southwestern Georgia, and Viviparus georgianus defined sensu stricto is found in eastern and southern Florida as well as the Altamaha River in Georgia.

Other populations in the Altamaha, Mississippi and St. Lawrence River basins have not been studied yet with respect to their specific genetic make-up, and so they are simply named as being part of the Viviparus georgianus species complex.

=== Nonindigenous distribution ===
This species has invaded the northern part of the United States: Ohio, Michigan, Minnesota Wisconsin, Virginia, Pennsylvania, New York, New Jersey, New England, as well as Quebec and Ontario in Canada.

In the Mid-Atlantic Region it is found in the Niagara River, Erie Canal, Hudson River drainage in New York, and possibly Lake Champlain. It is established in the Chesapeake Bay, Maryland.

In the Great Lakes Region: The first record of this introduced species in the Great Lakes basin is from the Hudson River drainage, connected to the Erie Canal and Mohawk River, in 1867. It was later reported from the Lake Michigan watershed by 1906 and Lake Erie by 1914. Other records are from 1931 near Buffalo, Lake Erie and the Niagara River. The New York State Museum has records from the 1950s and 1960s from 11 counties Mackie et al. (1980) list this species as recorded from Lake Huron, but they do not give the date of establishment, or any references.
