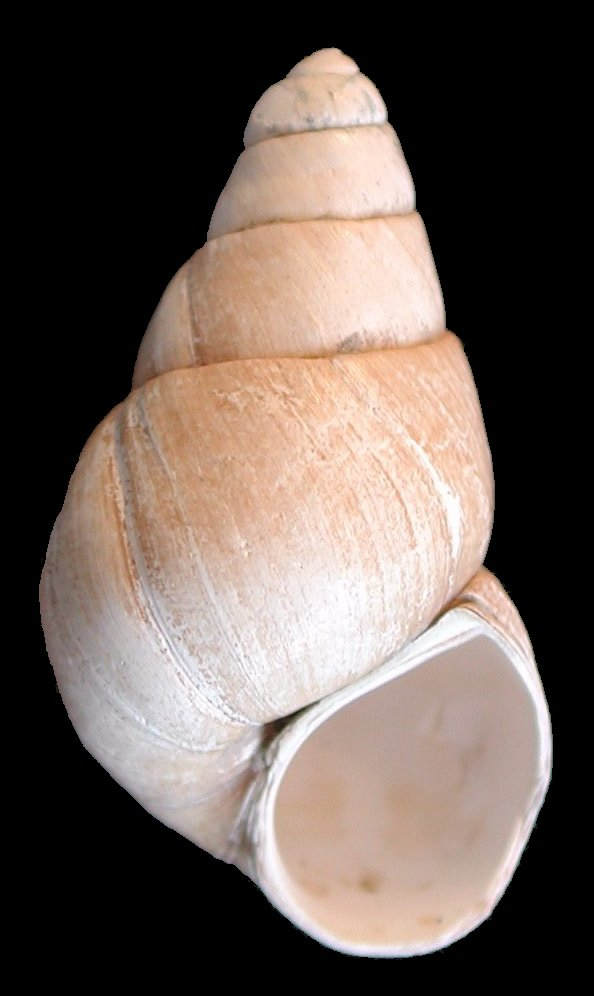
- A shell of Viviparus glacialis

Scientific classification
- Domain: Eukaryota
- Kingdom: Animalia
- Phylum: Mollusca
- Class: Gastropoda
- Subclass: Caenogastropoda
- Order: Architaenioglossa
- Family: Viviparidae
- Genus: Viviparus
- Species: V. glacialis

Binomial name
- Viviparus glacialis (S. V. Wood, 1872)

Synonyms
- Paludina glacialis Wood, 1872

= Viviparus glacialis =

Viviparus glacialis Temporal range: Early Pleistocene

Extinct species of gastropod

†Viviparus glacialis is an extinct species of fossil freshwater snail, an aquatic gastropod mollusks in the family Viviparidae, the river snails.

== Shell description ==
This species of snail has an elongated, slim, rather thick-walled shell with approximately 6 ¼ flat whorls which are separated by a shallow suture. The apex is blunt. The aperture is slantingly oval and weakly angulated at the top. The peristome is simple, not thickened and not continuous. There is a narrow umbilicus that may be covered with callus. The surface of the shell is smooth and glossy and bears regular growing lines. Under a magnification of c. 50× a sculpture of fine spiral grooves can be observed. These 'grooves' are composed of densely spaced tiny holes. In most cases the periostracum has not been preserved but if it is still present it has a light brown to black color. Whether or not the shell had a color pattern, and if so what that might have been is unknown.

The width of the shell is up to 13.5 mm, the height is up to 24 mm.

== Distribution ==
The species is only known from the Netherlands and the United Kingdom. From the United Kingdom only 6 specimens are known (among which is the holotype). The specimens have been found in the Weybourn Crag, which has an estuarine facies. In the Netherlands the species has been only found in deposits of along the River Rhine. It is known from clay pits in the surroundings of the village of Tegelen (Province of Limburg) and in several dozens boreholes, especially in the Southern part of the Netherlands. The species may occasionally occur there in very high numbers.

=== Fossil occurrence ===
In the Netherlands known from interglacial deposits of Tiglian and Pretiglian age. In the United Kingdom only present in the late Tiglian.

=== As an index fossil ===
Viviparus glacialis is, although already present in the Pretiglian, considered a guide fossil or index fossil for the Tiglian.

== Ecology ==
=== Reproduction and life span ===
Although all Viviparidae are ovoviviparous, nothing is known about the reproduction strategy of this species. Based upon the counting of the annual growth rings within the shell, this species may reach an age of at least 12 years.

=== Habitat ===
According to the ecological preferences of extant species co-occurring with Viviparus glacialis and the sedimentary facies in which these are found, the species favours quiet parts of a fluvial environment. From the same data it may be concluded that the species can endure a slight increase in salinity.
