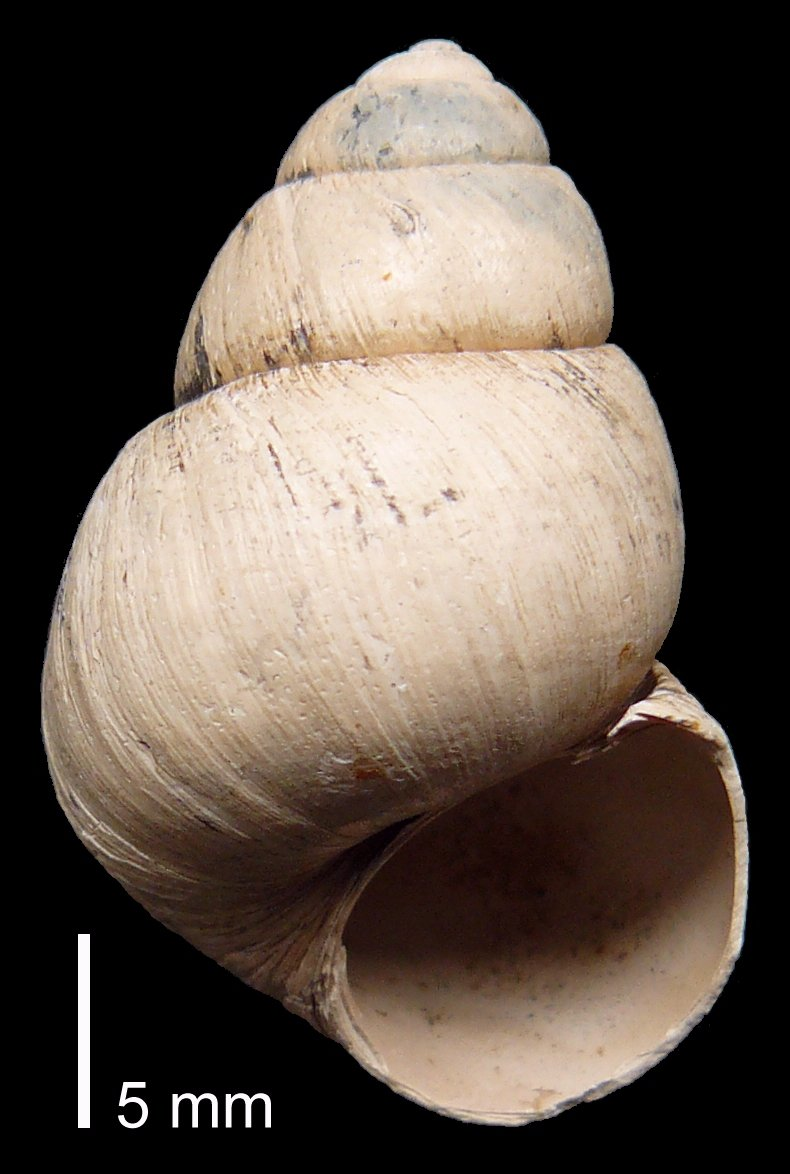
- A shell of Viviparus diluvianus from the type site in Berlin

Scientific classification
- Domain: Eukaryota
- Kingdom: Animalia
- Phylum: Mollusca
- Class: Gastropoda
- Subclass: Caenogastropoda
- Order: Architaenioglossa
- Family: Viviparidae
- Genus: Viviparus
- Species: V. diluvianus

Binomial name
- Viviparus diluvianus (Kunth, 1865)

Synonyms
- Paludina diluviana Kunth, 1865; Paludina clactonensis S. Wood, 1872

= Viviparus diluvianus =

Viviparus diluvianus Temporal range: Pleistocene

Extinct freshwater snail

†Viviparus diluvianus is an extinct species of freshwater snail with an operculum, an aquatic gastropod mollusk in the family Viviparidae, the river snails.

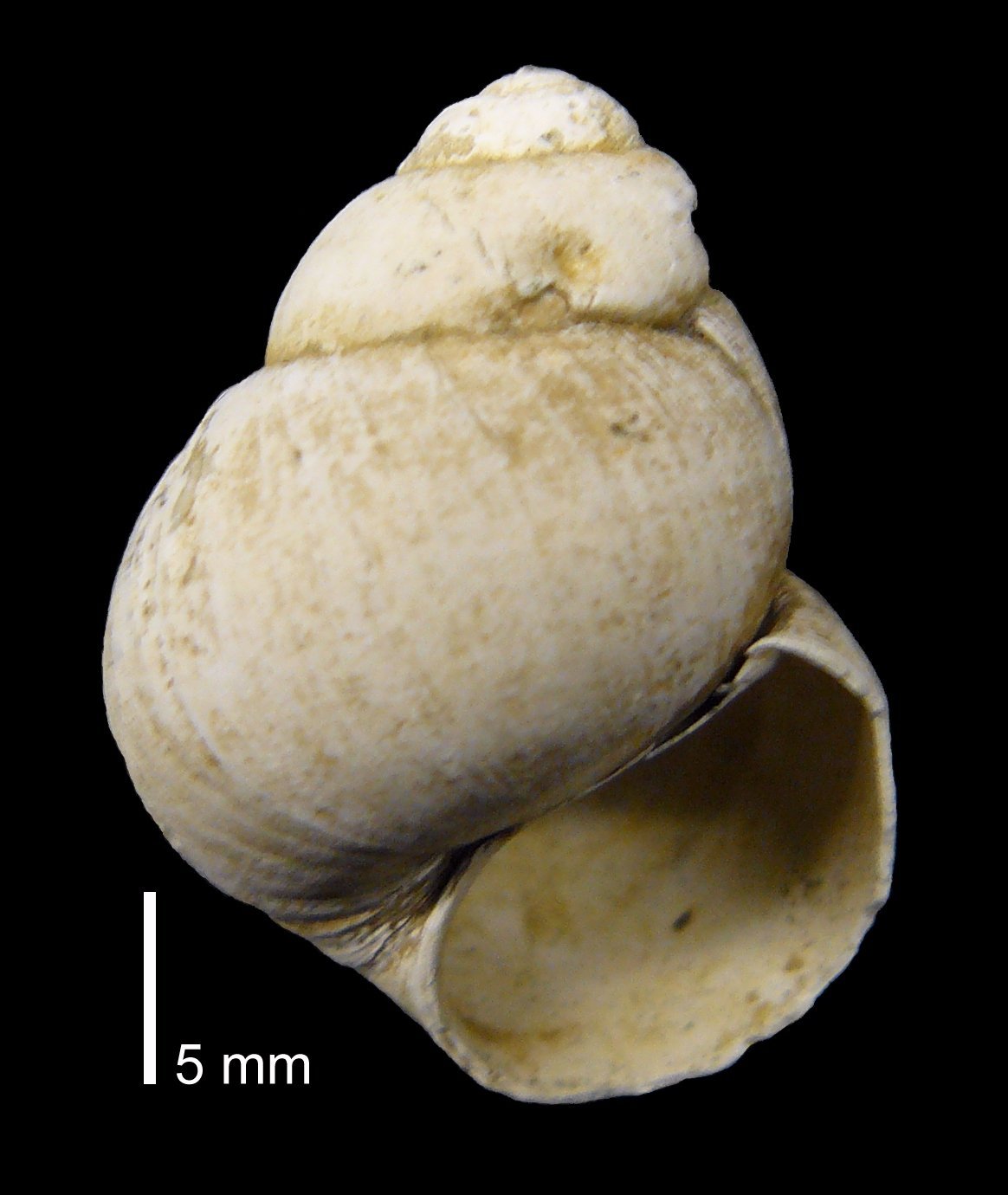
A shell of Viviparus diluvianus from the Netherlands.

== Distribution ==
Type locality is near Berlin in Germany.
