= Bellamya jeffreysi =

Conservation status
- Critically Endangered (IUCN 3.1)

Scientific classification
- Kingdom: Animalia
- Phylum: Mollusca
- Class: Gastropoda
- Subclass: Caenogastropoda
- Order: Architaenioglossa
- Family: Viviparidae
- Genus: Bellamya
- Species: B. jeffreysi

Binomial name
- Bellamya jeffreysi (Frauenfeld, 1865)

Synonyms
- Bellamya jeffreysii (Frauenfeld, 1865)

Species of gastropod

Bellamya jeffreysi is a species of large freshwater snail with a gill and an operculum, an aquatic gastropod mollusc in the family Viviparidae.

This species is found in Malawi and Mozambique, in Lake Malawi. Its natural habitat is freshwater lakes. It is threatened by sedimentation and pollution. The only known conservation measure is that a small area of the lake is protected as a national park.
