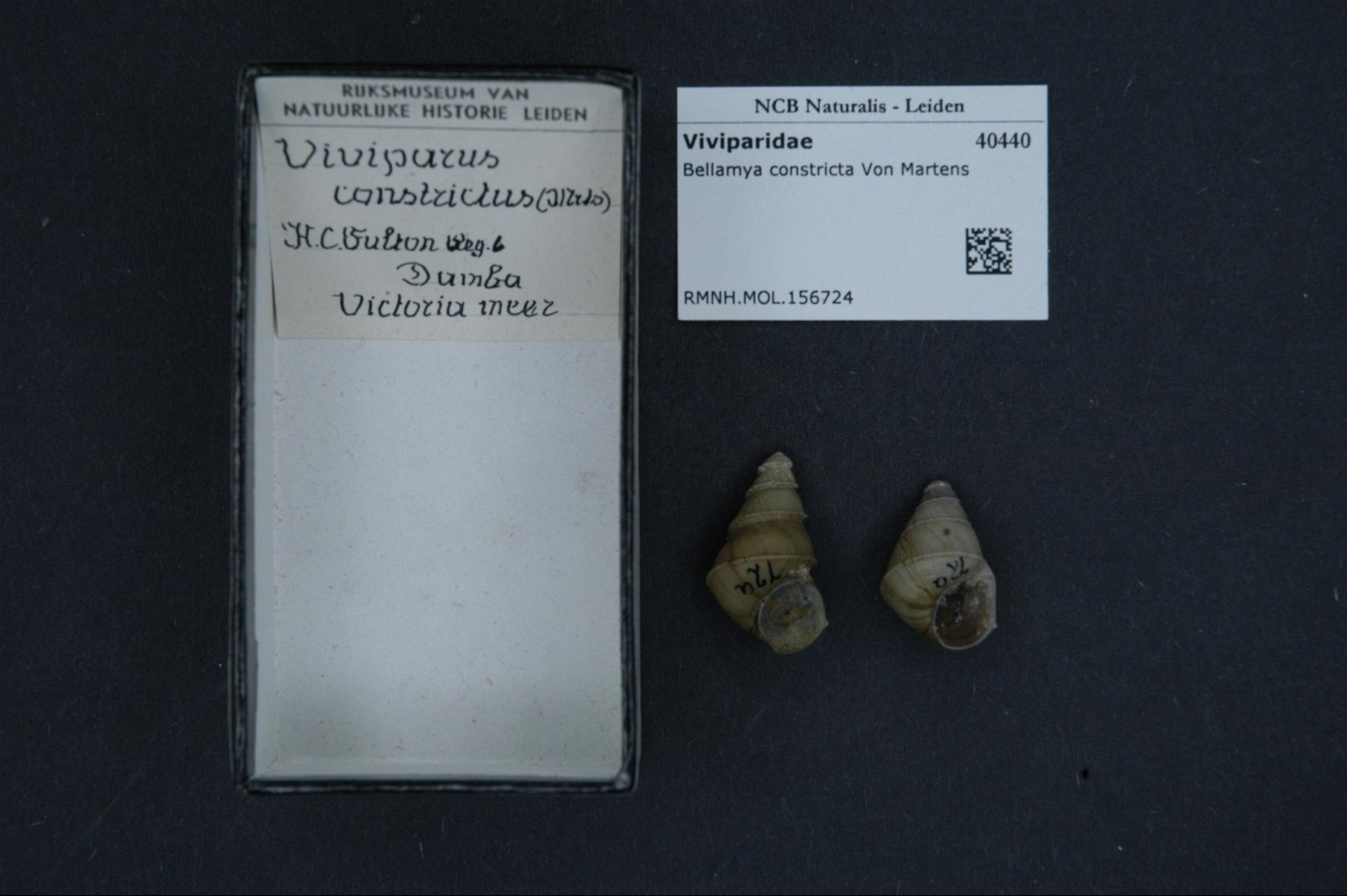

Conservation status
- Least Concern (IUCN 3.1)

Scientific classification
- Kingdom: Animalia
- Phylum: Mollusca
- Class: Gastropoda
- Subclass: Caenogastropoda
- Order: Architaenioglossa
- Family: Viviparidae
- Genus: Bellamya
- Species: B. constricta

Binomial name
- Bellamya constricta (von Martens, 1889)

Synonyms
- Bellamya costulata (von Martens, 1892) (a junior synonym); Bellamya jucunda (E.A. Smith, 1892) (a junior synonym); Bellamya victoriae (E.A. Smith, 1892) (a junior synonym); Paludina constricta von Martens, 1889 (original combination); Vivipara costulata von Martens, 1892 (a junior synonym); Vivipara rubicunda var. kisumiensis Preston, 1912 (junior synonym); Viviparus jucundus E.A. Smith, 1892 (original combination); Viviparus victoriae E.A. Smith, 1892 (a junior synonym)

= Bellamya constricta =

Species of gastropod

Bellamya constricta is a species of freshwater snail with a gill and an operculum, an aquatic gastropod mollusc in the family Viviparidae.

This snail is found in Kenya, Tanzania, and Uganda. Its natural habitat is freshwater lakes. It is threatened by habitat loss.
