= Bellamya leopoldvillensis =

Conservation status
- Data Deficient (IUCN 3.1)

Scientific classification
- Kingdom: Animalia
- Phylum: Mollusca
- Class: Gastropoda
- Subclass: Caenogastropoda
- Order: Architaenioglossa
- Family: Viviparidae
- Genus: Bellamya
- Species: B. leopoldvillensis

Binomial name
- Bellamya leopoldvillensis Putzeys, 1898

Species of gastropod

Bellamya leopoldvillensis is a species of large freshwater snail with a gill and an operculum, an aquatic gastropod mollusc in the family Viviparidae.

This species is endemic to the Democratic Republic of the Congo. It was first described by S. Putzeys in 1898.
