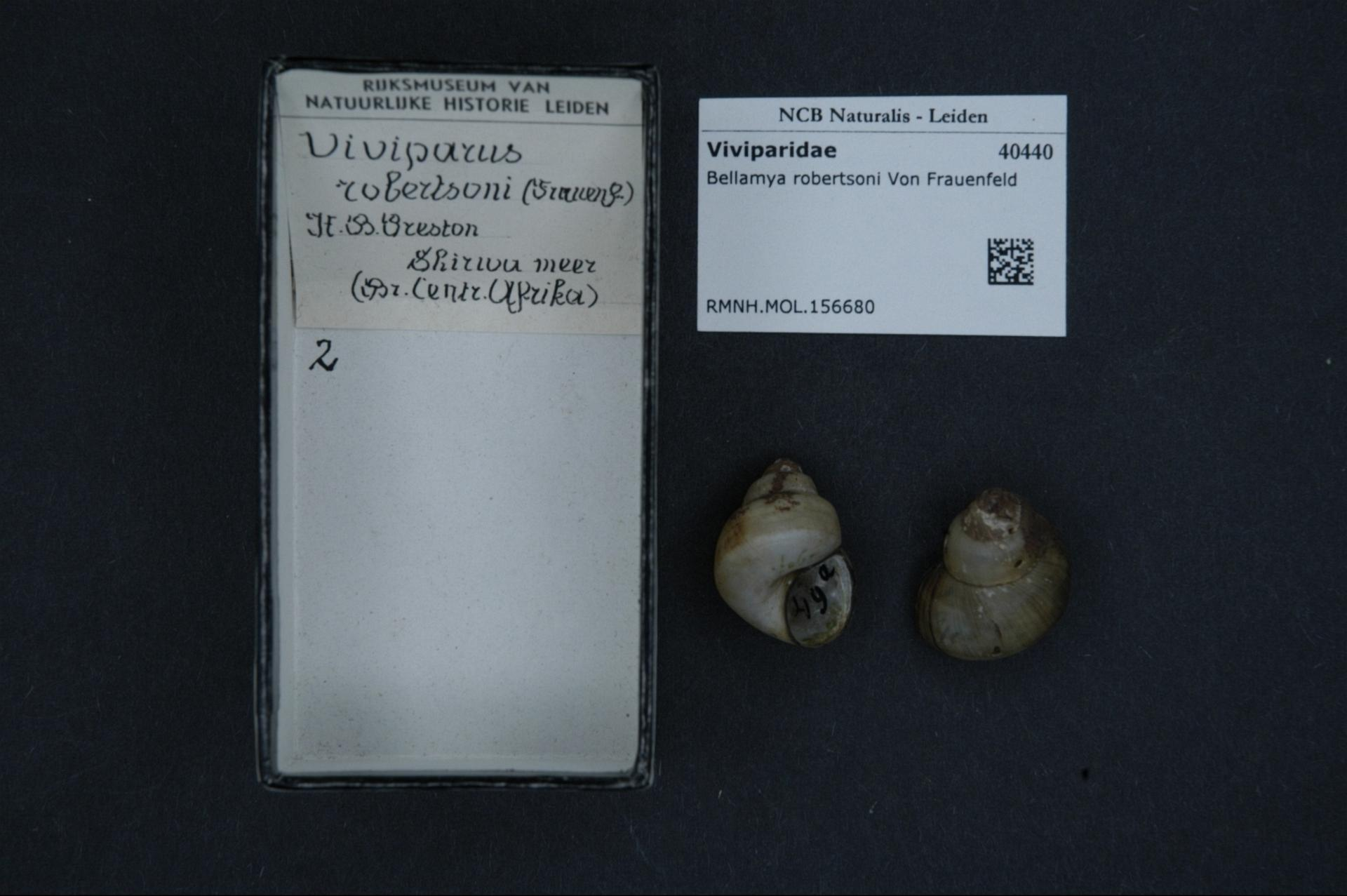

Conservation status
- Critically Endangered (IUCN 3.1)

Scientific classification
- Kingdom: Animalia
- Phylum: Mollusca
- Class: Gastropoda
- Subclass: Caenogastropoda
- Order: Architaenioglossa
- Family: Viviparidae
- Genus: Bellamya
- Species: B. robertsoni

Binomial name
- Bellamya robertsoni Frauenfeld, 1865

= Bellamya robertsoni =

Species of gastropod

Bellamya robertsoni is a species of large freshwater snail with a gill and an operculum, an aquatic gastropod mollusc in the family Viviparidae.

This species is found in Malawi and Mozambique.
