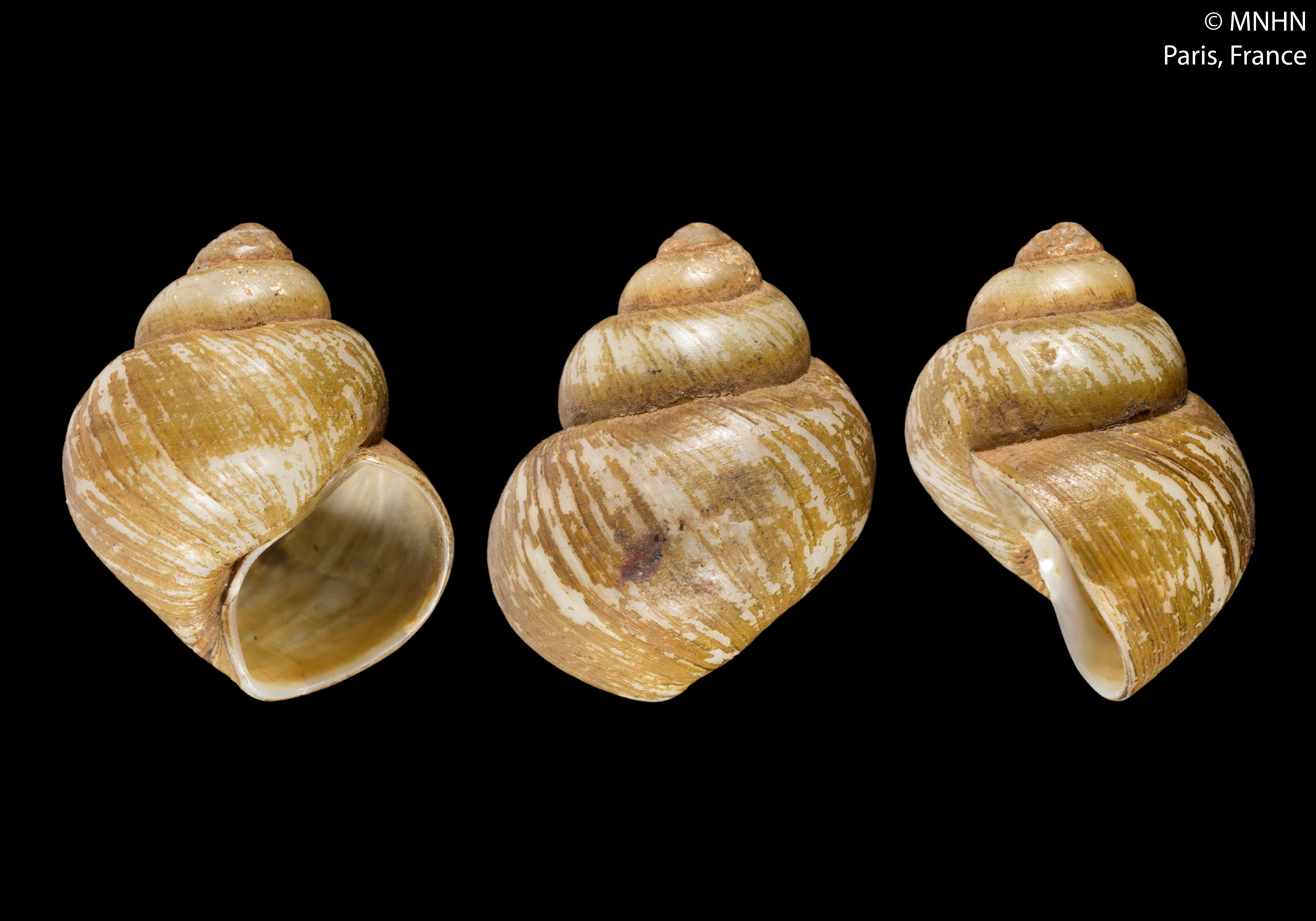
- Bellamya unicolor shell (syntype at MNHN, Paris)

Conservation status
- Least Concern (IUCN 3.1)

Scientific classification
- Kingdom: Animalia
- Phylum: Mollusca
- Class: Gastropoda
- Subclass: Caenogastropoda
- Order: Architaenioglossa
- Family: Viviparidae
- Genus: Bellamya
- Species: B. unicolor

Binomial name
- Bellamya unicolor (Olivier, 1804)

Synonyms
- Bellamya bellamya Jousseaume, 1886; Cyclostoma unicolor Olivier, 1804 (original combination); Vivipara duponti De Rochebrune, 1882 (a junior synonym); Vivipara unicolor (Olivier, 1804); Vivipara unicolor var. lenfanti Germain, 1907; Viviparus unicolor (Olivier, 1804) (superseded combination)

= Bellamya unicolor =

Species of gastropod

Bellamya unicolor is a species of large freshwater snail with a gill and an operculum, an aquatic gastropod mollusc in the family Viviparidae.

== Distribution ==
This species is found in Africa: Senegal, ...

== Ecology ==
Parasites of Bellamya unicolor include trematode Aspidogaster conchicola.
