= Bellamya monardi =

Conservation status
- Near Threatened (IUCN 3.1)

Scientific classification
- Kingdom: Animalia
- Phylum: Mollusca
- Class: Gastropoda
- Subclass: Caenogastropoda
- Order: Architaenioglossa
- Family: Viviparidae
- Genus: Bellamya
- Species: B. monardi

Binomial name
- Bellamya monardi (Haas, 1934)

Synonyms
- Viviparus monardi Haas, 1934

Species of gastropod

Bellamya monardi is a species of large freshwater snail with a gill and an operculum, an aquatic gastropod mollusk in the family Viviparidae.

This species is found in Angola and Namibia.
