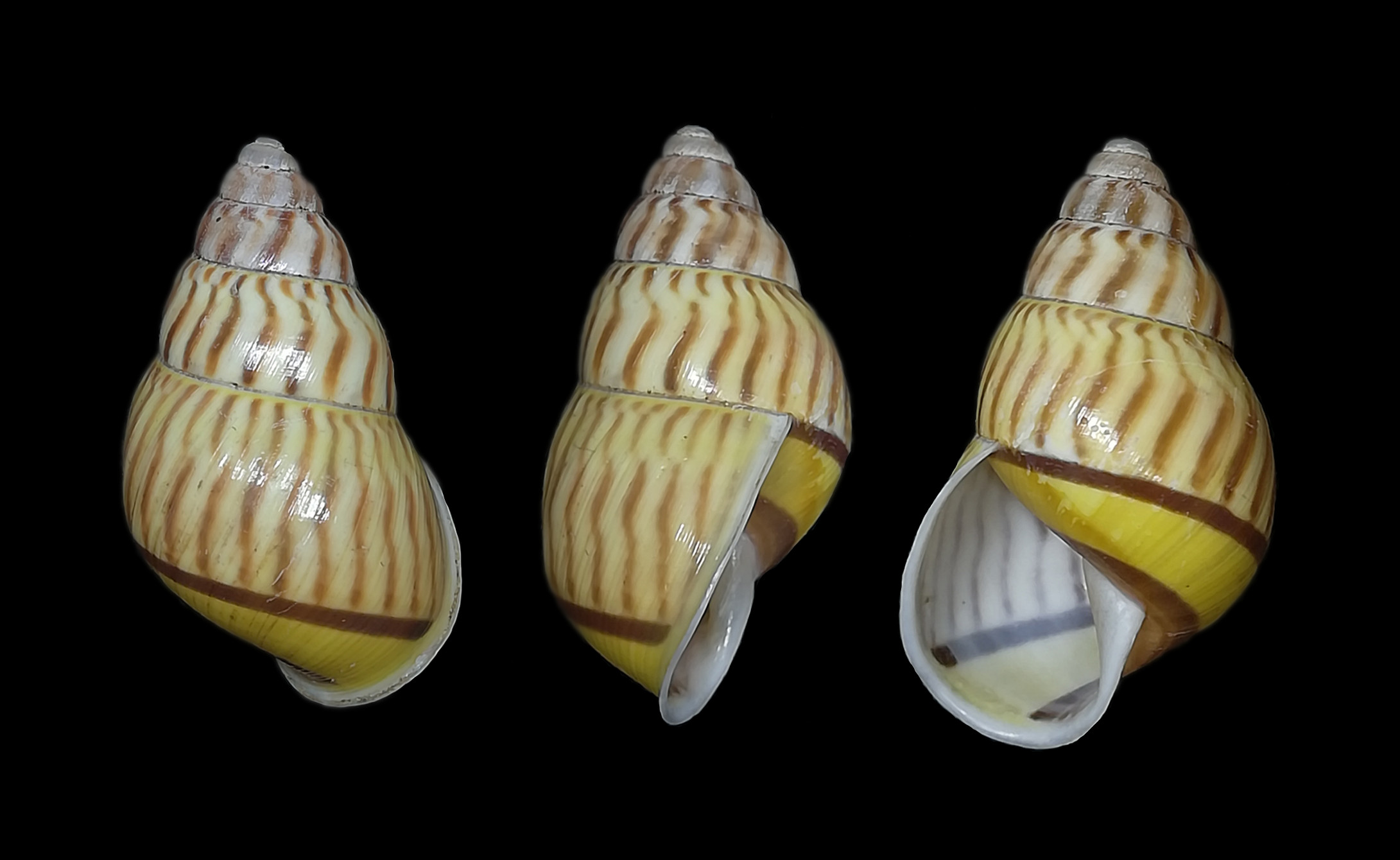

Scientific classification
- Kingdom: Animalia
- Phylum: Mollusca
- Class: Gastropoda
- Order: Stylommatophora
- Family: Camaenidae
- Genus: Amphidromus
- Species: A. jacobsoni

Binomial name
- Amphidromus jacobsoni Laidlaw, 1954

Synonyms
- Amphidromus stevenabbasorum Thach, 2021 junior subjective synonym; Amphidromus sumatranus f. jacobsoni Laidlaw, 1954 superseded rank; Amphidromus sumatranus jacobsoni Laidlaw, 1954 superseded rank

= Amphidromus jacobsoni =

Species of snail in the family Camaenidae

Amphidromus jacobsoni is a species of air-breathing land snail, a terrestrial pulmonate gastropod mollusc in the family Camaenidae.

== Description ==
The length of the shell attains 28 mm, its diameter 16.5 mm.

The whitish-brown coloration of the upper whorls transitions to a pale beige on the lower whorls. Beginning on the third whorl, a series of radial bars of darker beige appears, faintly interrupted at their midpoint and continuing to the posterior of the aperture on the body whorl. On the last two whorls, these bars tend to bifurcate from below, with a square spot of more intense color situated at the base of each fork. These spots form a spiral series around the periphery of the body whorl and, above the aperture, rest on a narrow, spiral band of dark beige that fades as it extends to the posterior of the shell. The umbilical area presents a beige hue. The underlying ground color is consistently bright yellow.

== Distribution ==
This species is found in Simeulue Island, Indonesia.
