= Eduard von Martens =

German zoologist (1831-1904)

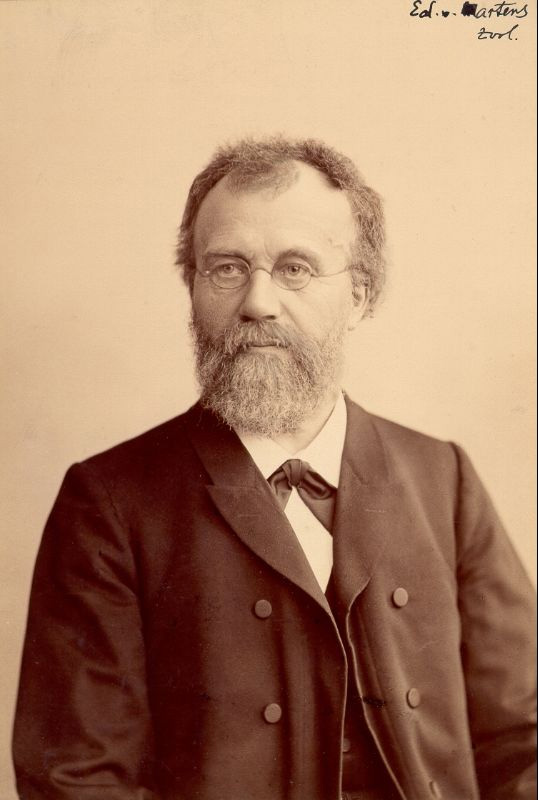
- Eduard von Martens, c. 1901
- Born: 18 April 1831; Stuttgart, Baden-Württemberg, Germany
- Died: 14 August 1904 (aged 73)
- Occupation: Zoologist

Eduard von Martens (18 April 1831 – 14 August 1904) also known as Carl or Karl Eduard von Martens, was a German zoologist.

Born in Stuttgart in 1831, von Martens attended university in Tübingen, where he graduated in 1855. He then moved to Berlin, where he would be based for the remainder of his career, both at the Zoological Museum of the Berlin University (from 1855) and, from 1859 on, at the Museum für Naturkunde.

In 1860, he embarked on the Thetis expedition of the Prussian expedition to Eastern Asia. When the expedition returned to Europe in 1862, von Martens continued to travel around Maritime Southeast Asia for 15 months. He published the results of the "Thetis" expedition in two volumes, constituting the Zoologischer Theil of the "Preussische Expedition nach Ost-Asien." Vol. ii, consisting of 447 pages and 22 plates, contained a very full account of the land molluscs.

Back in Berlin, von Martens was curator of the malacological and other invertebrate sections until his death.

Von Martens described 155 new genera (150 of them molluscs) and almost 1,800 species (including around 1,680 molluscs, 39 crustaceans, and 50 echinoderms).

He was a foreign member of the Linnean Society of London, and a corresponding member of the Zoological Society of London.

== Bibliography ==
Besides many memoirs, von Martens wrote over 200 separate papers in scientific publications. Besides his work on Mollusca, von Martens wrote upon all branches of zoology, but especially upon Crustacea and Echinoderms.

1850s

- 1856. "Conchyliologische Untersuchungen von Wilhelm Acton". Malakozoologische Blätter. 3: 194–197.
- 1857. "Die Ampullarien des Berliner Museums". Malakozoologische Blätter. 4: 181–213.
- 1858. "Ueber einige Velutina-Arten". Archiv für Naturgeschichte. 24: 145–151.
- 1858. "Ueber einige Brachwasserbewohner aus den Umgebungen Venedigs". Archiv für Naturgeschichte. 24: 152–208.
- 1859. "Neue Heliceen von Mittelamerika". Malakozoologische Blätter. 6: 17–19.
- 1859. "Neue Landschnecken aus Haiti". Malakozoologische Blätter. 6: 53–58.
- 1859. "Ueber einige Land- und Süsswasser-Schnecken aus Venezuela". Malakozoologische Blätter. 6: 59–66.
- 1859. "Beiträge zur Synonymie europäischer Binnenschnecken". Malakozoologische Blätter. 6: 127–178.

1860s

- 1860. Die Heliceen, nach natürlicher Verwandtschaft systematisch geordnet. Wilhelm Engelmann, Leipzig. (with Johann Christian Albers)
- 1860. "Drei neue Landschnecken". Malakozoologische Blätter. 6: 207–208.
- 1860. "Verzeichnis der von Prof. Peters in Mosambique gesammelten Land- und Süsswasser-Mollusken". Malakozoologische Blätter. 6: 211–221.
- 1860. "On the Mollusca of Siam". Proceedings of the Zoological Society of London. 1860: 6–18.
- 1861. "Die Japanesischen Binnenschnecken im Leidner Museum". Malakozoologische Blätter. 7: 32–61.
- 1861. "Malakologische Mittheilungen". Malakozoologische Blätter. 7: 225–228.
- 1863. "Cyclostomacea in insulis Moluccis proprie sit dictis nec non ins. Halmahera Djilolo lecta et breviter descripta". Malakozoologische Blätter. 10: 83–87.
- 1863. "Über die Landschnecken der Molukken". Malakozoologische Blätter. 10: 105–136.
- 1863. "Ueber die Landschnecken der Inseln östlich von Java". Malakozoologische Blätter. 10: 169–180.
- 1863. "Über neue mexikanische Landschnecken". Monatsberichte der Königlichen Preussischen Akademien der Wissenschaften zu Berlin (1861 November): 540–542.
- 1863. "Über seine Reise quer durch Sumatra im Jahre 1862". Zeitschrift für Allgemeine Erdkunde. 15: 551.
- 1864. "Drei central-asiatische Schnecken". Malakozoologische Blätter. 11: 114–119.
- 1864. "Ein neuer Cyclotus". Malakozoologische Blätter. 11: 113–114.
- 1864. "Malakologische Bemerkungen. 1. Zu Dohrn's und Heynemann's Aufzählungen der balearischen Schnecken. 2. Ueber Moitessieria Bourg. 3. Ueber die Gattung Bucculinus Adams". Malakozoologische Blätter. 11: 161–169.
- 1864. "Über neue Cyclostomaceen und Helicinen aus dem indischen Archipel. Monatsberichte der Königlichen Preussischen Akademien der Wissenschaften zu Berlin" (1861 Februar): 116–121.
- 1864. "Über eine neue Art von Rochen, Trygonoptera javanica aus Batavia und über neue Heliceen aus dem indischen Archipel". Monatsberichte der Königlichen Preussischen Akademien der Wissenschaften zu Berlin (1861 April): 260–270.
- 1864. "Diagnosen neuer Heliceen aus dem ostasiatischen Archipel". Monatsberichte der Königlichen Preussischen Akademien der Wissenschaften zu Berlin (1861 Juli): 523–529.
- 1864. "Über eine Reihe fossiler Muscheln". Zeitschrift der Deutschen Geologischen Gesellschaft. 162: 345–351.
- 1864. "Fossile Süsswasser-Conchylien aus Sibirien". Zeitschrift der Deutschen Geologischen Gesellschaft. 162: 345–351.
- 1864. "Über seine Reisen im ostindischen Archipel im Jahre 1862". Zeitschrift für Allgemeine Erdkunde. 16: 463.
- 1865. von Martens, E. (1865). "On the Australian species of Paludina". Annals and Magazine of Natural History. 3rd series. 16 (94): 255–256. doi:10.1080/00222936508679420.
- 1865. "Descriptions of the new species of shells". Annals and Magazine of Natural History. 3rd series. 16: 428–432. doi:10.1080/00222936508679462.
- 1865. "Ueber die mexikanischen Binnen-Conchylien aus den Sammlungen von Deppe und Uhde im Berliner Museum". Malakozoologische Blätter. 12: 1–78.
- 1865. "Ueber ostasiatische und neuholländische Paludinen". Malakozoologische Blätter. 12: 144–151.
- 1865. "Zusätze zu dem Aufsätze über Binnen-Conchylien". Malakozoologische Blätter. 12: 151–153.
- 1865. "Uebersicht der Land- und Süsswasser-Mollusken des Nil-Gebietes". Malakozoologische Blätter. 12: 177–207.
- 1865. "Über neue Landschnecken aus Ost-Indien und über zwei Seesterne von Costa-Rica". Monatsberichte der Königlichen Preussischen Akademien der Wissenschaften zu Berlin (1861 Januar): 51–59.
- 1866. "Verzeichnis der von Dr. E. Schweinfurth im Sommer 1864 auf seiner Reise am rothen Meere gesammelten und nach Berlin eingesendeten zoologischen Gegenstände". Verhandlungen der kaiserlich-königlichen zoologisch-botanischen Gesellschaft in Wien. 16: 377–382.
- 1866. "Conchological Gleanings. II. On some species of Assiminea". Annals and Magazine of Natural History. 3rd series. 17: 202–207.
- 1866. "Uebersicht der Land- und Süsswasser-Mollusken des Nil-Gebietes". Malakozoologische Blätter. 13: 1–21.
- 1866. "Ueber einige afrikanische Binnenconchylien". Malakozoologische Blätter. 13: 91–110.
- 1866. Genus Lanistes Montfort. In: Novitates Conchologicae. Series Prima. Mollusca extramarina. Beschreibung und Abbildung neuer oder kritischer Land- und Süßwassermollusken., vol. 2 Pfeiffer, K. ed., 285–295
- 1867. Die Preussische Expedition nach Ost-Asien. Nach amtlichen Quellen. Zoologischer Theil. Zweiter Band. Die Landschnecken, vol. 2, Königliche Geheime Ober-Hofbuchdruckerei, Berlin
- 1867. "Conchological Gleanings. VI. On the species of Argonauta". Annals and Magazine of Natural History. 3rd series. 20: 103–106.
- 1867. "Ueberblick der Najadeen des indischen Archipels". Malakozoologische Blätter. 14: 10–17.
- 1867. "Ueber einige Muscheln des oberen Nilgebietes". Malakozoologische Blätter. 14: 17–20.
- 1867. "Neuer Bulimus". Malakozoologische Blätter. 14: 63–64.
- 1867. "Ueber einige Landschnecken des oberen Amazonenstromgebietes". Malakozoologische Blätter. 14: 133–146.
- 1867. "Ueber die ostasiatischen Limnaeaceen". Malakozoologische Blätter. 14: 211–227.
- 1868. Martens, E Von (1868). "Ueber einige ostasiatische Süsswasserthiere". Archiv für Naturgeschichte. 34: 1–64. doi:10.5962/bhl.part.20475.
- 1868. "Zwei neue Landschnecken aus Costarica". Malakozoologische Blätter. 15: 155–157.
- 1868. "Ueber einige Heliceen vom Himalaya". Malakozoologische Blätter. 15: 162–165.
- 1868. "Ueber drei Philippinische Cochlostylen". Malakozoologische Blätter. 15: 162–165.
- 1868. "Ueber südbrasilianische Land-und Süsswassermollusken. Nach den Sammlungen von Dr. R. Hensel". Malakozoologische Blätter. 15: 169–217. 1854.
- 1868. Description of a new species. In: Novitates Conchologicae. Series Prima. Mollusca extramarina. Beschreibung und Abbildung neuer oder kritischer Land- und Süßwassermollusken., vol. 3 Pfeiffer, K. ed., 381
- 1869. Mollusken. In: Baron Carl Claus von der Decken's Reisen in Ost-Afrika in den Jahren 1859–1865, vol. 3 Wissenschaftliche Ergebnisse, Part 1, Säugethiere, Vögel, Amphibien, Crustaceen, Mollusken und Echinodermen Kersten, O. ed., 53–66
- 1869. Uebersicht der Land- und Süsswassermollusken der ostafrikanischen Küste von Cap Guardafui bis Port Natal nebst nächstliegenden Inseln. In: Baron Carl Claus von der Decken's Reisen in Ost-Afrika in den Jahren 1859–1865, vol. 3 Wissenschaftliche Ergebnisse, Part 1, Säugethiere, Vögel, Amphibien, Crustaceen, Mollusken und Echinodermen Kersten, O. ed., 148–160
- 1869. "Conchologische Notizen". Malakozoologische Blätter. 16: 72–88.
- 1869. "Ueber einige abyssinische Schnecken". Malakozoologische Blätter. 16: 208–215.
- 1869. "Conchylien aus Zanzibar zwischen Sesamsaamen". Nachrichtenblatt der Deutschen Malakozoologischen Gesellschaft. 1: 149–156.
- 1869. "Die Deckel von Neritina, Nerita und Navicella, insbesondere deren Werth für die Systematik". Nachrichtenblatt der Deutschen Malakozoologischen Gesellschaft. 1: 179–181.

1870s

- 1870. "Conchylien aus dem oberen Nilgebiet". Malakozoologische Blätter. 17: 32–36.
- 1870. "Ueber Nassa reticulata L.". Malakozoologische Blätter. 17: 86–88.
- 1870. "Über vier Arten Conchylien aus Samarkand". Sitzungsberichte der Gesellschaft Naturforschender Freunde zu Berlin Oktober: 56–57.
- 1871. "Die erste Landschnecke von Samarkand". Malakozoologische Blätter. 18: 61–69.
- 1871. "Über die von Ehrenberg auf der sibirischen Reise mit Alex. v. Humboldt gesammelten asiatischen Süsswasser-Conchylien". Sitzungsberichte der Gesellschaft Naturforschender Freunde zu Berlin Juni: 45–50.
- 1871. Donum Bismarckianum. Eine Sammlung von Südsee-Conchylien, Ferdinand Berggold, Berlin (mit B. Langkavel)
- 1872. "Conchylien aus Alaschka". Malakozoologische Blätter. 19: 78–99.
- 1872. "Mollusken der Insel St. Helena". Nachrichtenblatt der Deutschen Malakozoologischen Gesellschaft. 4: 58–61.
- 1873. Description of a new species. In: Catalogue of the marine Mollusca of New Zealand, with diagnoses of the species, vol. Hutton, F.W. ed.
- 1873. Critical list of the Mollusca of New Zealand contained in European collections, with references to descriptions and synonyms, Government printer, Wellington
- 1873. Die Binnenmollusken Venezuela's. In: Festschrift zur Feier des hundertjähringen Bestehens der Gesellschaft naturforschender Freunde zu Berlin, vol. Reichert, K.B. ed., 157–225
- 1873. "Sopra alcuni molluschi terrestri di Malta". Bullettino Malacologico Italiano. 6: 26–29.
- 1873. "Ueber Land- und Süsswasser-Conchylien aus dem Peloponnes". Malakozoologische Blätter. 20: 31–50.
- 1873. "Ueber Landschnecken aus Celebes". Malakozoologische Blätter. 20: 155–177.
- 1874. Sliznyaki Mollusca. In: Reise in Turkestan von Alexis Fedtschenkow. Auf Veranlassung des General-Gouverneurs von Turestan, General Kaufmann Gesellschaft der Freunde der Naturwissenschaften in Moskau ed., vol. 2 Zoologischer Theil 1 Fedchencko, A.P. ed.
- 1874. Ueber vorderasiatische Conchylien, nach den Sammlungen des Prof. Hausknecht. In: Novitates Conchologicae. Series Prima. Mollusca extramarina. Beschreibung und Abbildung neuer oder kritischer Land- und Süßwassermollusken., vol. 5 Pfeiffer, K. ed.
- 1874. "Ein neuer Cyclotus". Jahrbücher der Deutschen Malakozoologischen Gesellschaft. 1: 56.
- 1874. "Ueber einige südafrikanische Mollusken nach der Sammlung von Dr. G. Fritsch". Jahrbücher der Deutschen Malakozoologischen Gesellschaft. 1: 119–146.
- 1874. "Zusammenstellung der von Dr. Georg Schweinfurth in Afrika gesammelten Land- und Süsswasser-Conchylien". Malakozoologische Blätter. 21: 37–46.
- 1874. "Beschreibung einer neuen Cochlostyla". Malakozoologische Blätter. 21: 46–47.
- 1874. "Neue Helix-Arten aus China". Malakozoologische Blätter. 21: 67–69.
- 1874. "Zusätze zu den Mollusken des Peloponneses". Malakozoologische Blätter. 21: 122.
- 1874. "Eine neue Clausilie". Malakozoologische Blätter. 21: 157.
- 1874. "Conchylien der libyschen Wüste". Sitzungsberichte der Gesellschaft Naturforschender Freunde zu Berlin (Juni): 63–66.
- 1874. "Uebersicht der von Al. Fedtschenko in Turkestan gesammelten Conchylien". Sitzungsberichte der Gesellschaft Naturforschender Freunde zu Berlin (Mai): 43–51.
- 1874. "Fossile Süsswasser-Conchylien aus Sibirien". Zeitschrift der Deutschen Geologischen Gesellschaft. 26: 741–751.
- 1875. Die Gattung Neritina. In: Systematisches Conchylien-Cabinet von Martini und Chemnitz, vol. 2, 1–64
- 1875. "Bemerkungen zu vorstehender Arbeit. O. von Moellendorff, Chinesische Landschnecken". Jahrbücher der Deutschen Malakozoologischen Gesellschaft. 2: 126–135.
- 1875. "Cristaria reiniana n.sp". Jahrbücher der Deutschen Malakozoologischen Gesellschaft. 2: 136.
- 1875. "Diagnose einer neuen Macrochlamys". Jahrbücher der Deutschen Malakozoologischen Gesellschaft. 2: 214.
- 1875. "Review of Pellegr. Strobel, Materiali per una malacostatica di terra e di aqua dolce dell'Argentina meridionale. Pisa 1875". Jahrbücher der Deutschen Malakozoologischen Gesellschaft. 2: 268–276.
- 1875. "List of land and freshwater shells collected by Mr. Osbert Salvin in Guatemala in 1873–1874". Proceedings of the Zoological Society of London. 1875: 647–649.
- 1875. "Ostasiatische Land- und Süsswasser-Conchylien". Sitzungsberichte der Gesellschaft Naturforschender Freunde zu Berlin (Januar): 2–4.
- 1875. "Russische und Sibirische Conchylien, von Ehrenberg gesammelt". Sitzungsberichte der Gesellschaft Naturforschender Freunde zu Berlin (Juli): 88–96.
- 1875. "Binnen-Mollusken aus dem mittleren China". Malakozoologische Blätter. 22: 185–188.
- 1876. "Review of W. Dybowski, Die Gasteropoden-Fauna des Baikal-Sees". Jahrbücher der Deutschen Malakozoologischen Gesellschaft. 3: 181–184.
- 1876. "Ueber einige Conchylien aus Westafrika". Jahrbücher der Deutschen Malakozoologischen Gesellschaft. 3: 236–249.
- 1876. "Conchylien von den Comoren". Jahrbücher der Deutschen Malakozoologischen Gesellschaft. 3: 250–253.
- 1876. "Landschnecken aus Costarica und Guatemala". Jahrbücher der Deutschen Malakozoologischen Gesellschaft. 3: 253–261.
- 1876. "Binnen-Mollusken von Chiwa". Jahrbücher der Deutschen Malakozoologischen Gesellschaft. 3: 334–337.
- 1876. "Einige neue griechische Schnecken". Jahrbücher der Deutschen Malakozoologischen Gesellschaft. 3: 338–343.
- 1876. "Ueber einige japanische Landschnecken". Jahrbücher der Deutschen Malakozoologischen Gesellschaft. 3: 357–363.
- 1876. "Transkaukasische Mollusken, von Dr. O. Schneider gesammelt". Jahrbücher der Deutschen Malakozoologischen Gesellschaft. 3: 364–370.
- 1876. "Die von Prof. R. Buchholz in Westafrika gesammelten Land- und Süsswassermollusken". Monatsberichte der Königlichen Preussischen Akademien der Wissenschaften zu Berlin (1861 April): 253–274.
- 1876. "Eine neue transcaucasische Clausilie". Nachrichtenblatt der Deutschen Malakozoologischen Gesellschaft. 8: 90–91.
- 1876. Description of nonmarine Mollusca. In: Novitates Conchologicae. Series Prima. Mollusca extramarina. Beschreibung und Abbildung neuer oder kritischer Land- und Süßwassermollusken., vol. 4 Pfeiffer, K. ed., 145–171
- 1876. Die Bulimus-Arten aus der Gruppe Borus. In: Novitates Conchologicae. Series Prima. Mollusca extramarina. Beschreibung und Abbildung neuer oder kritischer Land- und Süßwassermollusken., vol. 5 Pfeiffer, K. ed., 1–26
- 1877. Die Gattung Neritina. In: Systematisches Conchylien-Cabinet von Martini und Chemnitz, vol. 2, 65–144
- 1877. "Land- und Süsswasser-Schnecken von Puerto Rico". Jahrbücher der Deutschen Malakozoologischen Gesellschaft. 4: 340–362.
- 1877. "Helix schweinfurthi sp.n.". Jahrbücher der Deutschen Malakozoologischen Gesellschaft. 4: 368.
- 1877. "Übersicht der während der Reise um die Erde in den Jahren 1874–1876 auf S.M. Schiff Gazelle gesammelten Land- und Süsswasser-Mollusken". Monatsberichte der Königlichen Preussischen Akademien der Wissenschaften zu Berlin (1861 Mai): 261–291.
- 1877. Description of nonmarine Mollusca. In: Novitates Conchologicae. Series Prima. Mollusca extramarina. Beschreibung und Abbildung neuer oder kritischer Land- und Süßwassermollusken., vol. 5 Pfeiffer, K. ed., 29–38
- 1877. "Uebersicht über die von den Herren Hilgendorf und Dönitz in Japan gesammelten Binnemollusken". Sitzungsberichte der Gesellschaft Naturforschender Freunde zu Berlin (April): 97–123.
- 1877. "Uebersicht der von Herrn Dr. O. Finsch und dem Grafen zu Waldburg-Zeil in Sibirien gesammelten Mollusken". Sitzungsberichte der Gesellschaft Naturforschender Freunde zu Berlin (November): 237–242.
- 1878. Die Gattung Neritiana. In. Novitates Conchologicae. Series Prima. Mollusca extramarina. Beschreibung und Abbildung neuer oder kritischer Land- und Süßwassermollusken., vol. 2 Pfeiffer, K. ed., 145–208
- 1878. Kaukasische Conchylien. In: Naturwissenschaftliche Beiträge zur Kenntnis der Kaukasusländer, auf Grund seiner Sammelbeute, Schneider, O. ed., 11–34
- 1878. "Übersicht der von Hrn. J.M. Hildebrandt während seiner letzten mit Unterstützung der Akademie in Ostafrika ausgeführten Reise gesammelten Land- und Süsswasser-Conchylien". Monatsberichte der Königlichen Preussischen Akademien der Wissenschaften zu Berlin (1861 April): 288–299.
- 1878. "Ueber einige Conchylien aus den kälteren Meeresgegenden der südliche Erdhälfte". Sitzungsberichte der Gesellschaft Naturforschender Freunde zu Berlin (Februar): 20–26.
- 1878. "Ueber einige Crustaceen und Mollusken, welche das zoologische Museum in letzter Zeit erhalten hat". Sitzungsberichte der Gesellschaft Naturforschender Freunde zu Berlin (Juni): 131–135.
- 1879. "Übersicht der von Herrn W. Peters von 1843 bis 1847 in Mossambique gesammelten Mollusken". Monatsberichte der Königlichen Preussischen Akademien der Wissenschaften zu Berlin (1861 Juli): 727–749.
- 1879. Descriptions of nonmarine Mollusca. In: Novitates Conchologicae. Series Prima. Mollusca extramarina. Beschreibung und Abbildung neuer oder kritischer Land- und Süßwassermollusken., vol. 5 Pfeiffer, K. ed., 175–197
- 1879. "Vorzeigung einiger von H. Krone auf den Auklandinseln gesammelten Conchylien". Sitzungsberichte der Gesellschaft Naturforschender Freunde zu Berlin (März): 37–38.
- 1879. "Vorzeigung von Landschnecken aus dem chinesischen Löss". Sitzungsberichte der Gesellschaft Naturforschender Freunde zu Berlin (Mai): 73–74.
- 1879. "Ueber mehrerlei ausländische Conchylien". Sitzungsberichte der Gesellschaft Naturforschender Freunde zu Berlin (Juli): 99–105.
- 1879. "Vorzeigung von mittelasiatischen Land- und Süsswasser-Schnecken". Sitzungsberichte der Gesellschaft Naturforschender Freunde zu Berlin (Oktober): 122–126.

1880s

- 1880. Mollusken. In: Beiträge zur Meeresfauna der Insel Mauritius und der Seychellen, vol. Möbius, K. ed., 181–352
- 1880. "Aufzählung der von Dr. Alexander Brandt in Russisch-Armenien gesammelten Mollusken". Mélanges Biologiques. 10: 379–400.
- 1880. "Aufzählung der von Dr. Alexander Brandt in Russisch- Armenien gesammelten Mollusken". Bulletin de l'Académie Impériale des Sciences de St.-Pétersbourg. 26: 142–158.
- 1880. "Description of non-marine Mollusca". Conchologische Mittheilungen. 1: 33–44.
- 1880. "Vorzeigung einiger Conchylien aus den sogenannten Muschelbergen Brasiliens". Sitzungsberichte der Gesellschaft Naturforschender Freunde zu Berlin (Oktober): 123–125.
- 1880. "Über einige Landschnecken, welche Dr.O. Finsch auf der Karolinien gesammelt hat". Sitzungsberichte der Gesellschaft Naturforschender Freunde zu Berlin (November): 143–147.
- 1880. "Description of non-marine Mollusca". Conchologische Mittheilungen. 1: 1–32.
- 1881. Die Gattung Navicella. In. Systematisches Conchylien-Cabinet von Martini und Chemnitz, vol. 2, 1–40
- 1881. "Descriptions of non-marine Mollusca". Conchologische Mittheilungen. 1: 73–101.
- 1881. "Description of non-marine Mollusca". Conchologische Mittheilungen. 2: 103–121.
- 1881. "Land-Schnecken von Sokotora". Nachrichtenblatt der Deutschen Malakozoologischen Gesellschaft. 13: 134–138.
- 1881. "Ueber mehrere Conchylien, theils aus Central-Asien, theils von S.M. Schiff Gazelle". Sitzungsberichte der Gesellschaft Naturforschender Freunde zu Berlin (April): 63–67.
- 1881. "Ueber mehrere von S.M. Schiff Gazelle von der Magelhaenstrasse, der Ostküste Patagoniens und der Kerguelen-Inseln mitgebrachte Meeres-Conchylien". Sitzungsberichte der Gesellschaft Naturforschender Freunde zu Berlin (Mai): 75–80.
- 1881. "Vorlegung einiger Squilliden aus dem zoologischen Museum in Berlin". Sitzungsberichte der Gesellschaft Naturforschender Freunde zu Berlin (Juni): 91–94.
- 1881. "Vorlegung zweier Binnenconchylien aus Angola". Sitzungsberichte der Gesellschaft Naturforschender Freunde zu Berlin (Oktober): 121–122.
- 1882. Die Gattung Navicella. In: Systematisches Conchylien-Cabinet von Martini und Chemnitz, vol. 2, 41–56
- 1882. "Binne-Conchylien aus Angola und Loango". Jahrbücher der Deutschen Malakozoologischen Gesellschaft. 9: 243–250.
- 1882. "Über centralasiatische Mollusken. Mémoires de l'Académie impériale des Sciences de St.-Pétersbourg Classe physico- mathématique 30": 1–65.
- 1882. "Ueber von Herrn Apollo Kuschakewitz gesammelte centralasiatische Land- und Süsswasser-Schnecken". Sitzungsberichte der Gesellschaft Naturforschender Freunde zu Berlin (Juli): 103–107.
- 1882. "Vorzeigung zweier neuer Arten von Meer-Conchylien von der Expedition S.M. Sch. Gazelle". Sitzungsberichte der Gesellschaft Naturforschender Freunde zu Berlin (Juli): 107.
- 1882. "Ueber von den Gebrüdern Krause in Amerika gesammelte Conchylien". Sitzungsberichte der Gesellschaft Naturforschender Freunde zu Berlin (November): 138–143.
- 1883. Martens, Propessor Edward V.; Bland, Thomas (1882). "Description of two species of land shells from Porto Rico". Annals of the New York Academy of Sciences. 2 (1): 370–371. Bibcode:1882NYASA...2..370M. doi:10.1111/j.1749-6632.1882.tb56969.x. S2CID 85648200.
- 1883. "Conchylien von Salanga". Conchologische Mittheilungen. 2: 138–140.
- 1883. "Mollusken von Sokotra". Conchologische Mittheilungen. 2: 140–152.
- 1883. "Diagnosen neuer Arten. Jahrbücher der Deutschen Malakozoologischen Gesellschaft 10": 81–84.
- 1883. "Vorlegung einiger centralafrikanischer, von Dr. Böhm und Lieutenant Wissmann gesammelten Conchylien". Sitzungsberichte der Gesellschaft Naturforschender Freunde zu Berlin (Mai): 71–74.
- 1883. "Ueber einige von Ruhmer gesammelte Landschnecken und Reptilien aus der Cyrenaika". Sitzungsberichte der Gesellschaft Naturforschender Freunde zu Berlin (November): 147–150.
- 1884. "Ueber das Vorkommen einiger Landschnecken aus Sardinien und aus Südost-Borneo". Sitzungsberichte der Gesellschaft Naturforschender Freunde zu Berlin (Dezember): 195–199.
- 1885. "Uebersicht der von Herrn Dr. Alfred Stübel im nördlichen Theil von Süd-Amerika gesammelten Binnen.Conchylien". Conchologische Mittheilungen. 2: 155–179.
- 1885. "Binnenmollusken aus Mittel- und Ost-Asien". Conchologische Mittheilungen. 2: 179–185.
- 1885. "Landschnecken aus dem Mittelmeer-Gebiet". Conchologische Mittheilungen. 2: 185–188.
- 1885. "Afrikanische Binnenmollusken". Conchologische Mittheilungen. 2: 188–190.
- 1885. "Ueber Bulimulus und Otostomus". Conchologische Mittheilungen. 2: 190–197.
- 1885. "Vorlegung einiger centralasiatische Landschnecken von Fergana". Sitzungsberichte der Gesellschaft Naturforschender Freunde zu Berlin (Februar): 17–18.
- 1885. "Vorläufige Mittheilung über die Molluskenfauna von Süd-Georgien". Sitzungsberichte der Gesellschaft Naturforschender Freunde zu Berlin (März): 89–94.
- 1885. "Ueber neu erworbene Conchylien aus dem zoologischen Museum". Sitzungsberichte der Gesellschaft Naturforschender Freunde zu Berlin (Dezember): 190–194.
- 1885. "Vorlegung von Landschnecken, welche zwischen Kairo und Koseir von Schweinfurth gesammelt wurden". Sitzungsberichte der Gesellschaft Naturforschender Freunde zu Berlin (März): 87–89.
- 1885. "Ueber brasilianische Land- und Süsswasser Mollusken". Sitzungsberichte der Gesellschaft Naturforschender Freunde zu Berlin (Juli): 147–149.
- 1886. Description of a new Physa. In: Systematisches Conchylien-Cabinet von Martini und Chemnitz, vol. 1 Clessin, S. ed., 350
- 1886. Mollusca. In: M.M. Schepman, Systematische lijst, met beschrijving der nieuwe soorten.. In. Midden-Sumatra. Reizen en onderzoekingen der Sumatra-Expeditie ... Deel IV Natuurlijke Historie, I Fauna, 3, vol. 3 Veth, P.J. ed., 5–18
- 1886. "Vorzeigungen einiger Land- und Süsswasser-Schnecken von Celebes und von der Goldküste". Sitzungsberichte der Gesellschaft Naturforschender Freunde zu Berlin (Juli): 112–115.
- 1886. "Vorzeigungen von Schweinfurth gesammelter subfossiler Süsswasser-Conchylien aus Aegyptien". Sitzungsberichte der Gesellschaft Naturforschender Freunde zu Berlin (Oktober): 126–129.
- 1886. "Ueber einige neue Landschnecken aus Mittel- und Süd-Amerika". Sitzungsberichte der Gesellschaft Naturforschender Freunde zu Berlin (Dezember): 161–162.
- 1886. "Vorzeigungen einiger der von Dr. Gottsche in Japan und Korea gesammelten Land- und Süsswasser-Mollusken". Sitzungsberichte der Gesellschaft Naturforschender Freunde zu Berlin (Mai): 76–80.
- 1886 (with G. Pfeiffer). "Die Mollusken von Süd-Georgien nach der Ausbeute der Deutschen Station 1882–83". Jahrbuch der Hamburgischen Wissenschaftlichen Anstalten. 3: 63–135.
- 1887–1889. Die Gattung Nerita und Neritopsis. In: Systematisches Conchylien-Cabinet von Martini und Chemnitz, vol. 2, 1–64
- 1887. Martens, Eduard (1887). "List of the Shells of Mergui and its Archipelago, collected for the Trustees of the Indian Museum, Calcutta, by Dr. John Anderson, F.R.S., Superintendent of the Museum". Journal of the Linnean Society of London, Zoology. 21 (130): 155–219. doi:10.1111/j.1096-3642.1887.tb00974.x.
- 1887. "Vorlegung einer neuen Art von Lanistes". Sitzungsberichte der Gesellschaft Naturforschender Freunde zu Berlin (Juni): 96–97.
- 1887. "Vorlegung einiger Süsswassermuscheln aus Guatemala". Sitzungsberichte der Gesellschaft Naturforschender Freunde zu Berlin (Juli): 106–108.
- 1888. "Conus prometheus und Strombus fasciatus von Banji". Sitzungsberichte der Gesellschaft Naturforschender Freunde zu Berlin (April): 63–64.
- 1888. "Zwei neue Arten, Bulimus proclivis, Anodonta legumen". Sitzungsberichte der Gesellschaft Naturforschender Freunde zu Berlin (April): 64–65.
- 1888. "Dahinscheiden des Kaiser Friedrich". Sitzungsberichte der Gesellschaft Naturforschender Freunde zu Berlin (Juni): 89.
- 1888. "Conchylien aus Kamerun von Zeuner gesammelt, Limicolaria praetexta, n.sp". Sitzungsberichte der Gesellschaft Naturforschender Freunde zu Berlin (Oktober): 148–149.
- 1889. "Griechische Mollusken. Gesammelt von Eberh. von Örtzen. Archiv für Naturgeschichte 55": 169–240.
- 1889. "Descriptions of non-marine Mollusca". Conchologische Mittheilungen. 3: 1–19.
- 1889. "Ueber südarabische Landschnecken". Nachrichtenblatt der Deutschen Malakozoologischen Gesellschaft. 21: 145–153.
- 1889. "Eine neue Damara-Schnecke". Nachrichtenblatt der Deutschen Malakozoologischen Gesellschaft. 21: 154–155.
- 1889. "Description of new species of Athoracophorus from New Zealand. In H. Simroth, Beiträge zur Kenntniss der Nacktschnecken". Nova Acta Academiae Caesareae Leopoldino-Carolinae Germanicae Naturae Curiosorum. 54: 1–91.
- 1889. "Südafrikanische Landschnecken". Sitzungsberichte der Gesellschaft Naturforschender Freunde zu Berlin (Oktober): 160–165.
- 1889. "Landschnecken aus Lykien". Sitzungsberichte der Gesellschaft Naturforschender Freunde zu Berlin (November): 182–183.
- 1889. "Landschnecken von Sinai". Sitzungsberichte der Gesellschaft Naturforschender Freunde zu Berlin (Dezember): 200–201.

1890s

- 1890–1901. Land and Freshwater Mollusca. Biologia Centrali-Americana. London: Published for the editors by R. H. Porter. p. 706.
- 1890. "Neue Landschnecke aus Tripoli". Sitzungsberichte der Gesellschaft Naturforschender Freunde zu Berlin (April): 79–80.
- 1890. "Landschnecken aus dem Pondo-Land". Sitzungsberichte der Gesellschaft Naturforschender Freunde zu Berlin (Mai): 85–88.
- 1890. "Eine am Kilimandscharo gesammelte Landschnecke". Sitzungsberichte der Gesellschaft Naturforschender Freunde zu Berlin (Juli): 132.
- 1891. Landschnecken des Indischen Archipels. In: Ergebnisse einer Reise in Niederländisch Ost-Indien, vol. Weber, M. ed., 209–263
- 1891. "Von Stuhlmann und Emin Pascha in Ukwere, etc. gesammelte Land- und Süsswasser-Conchylien". Sitzungsberichte der Gesellschaft Naturforschender Freunde zu Berlin (Januar): 13–18.
- 1891. "Neue Art von Süsswassermuscheln aus Westafrica, Cyrenoida rhodopyga". Sitzungsberichte der Gesellschaft Naturforschender Freunde zu Berlin (Januar): 18.
- 1891. "Die von Preuss in Kamerun gesammelten Land- und Süsswasser-Mollusken". Sitzungsberichte der Gesellschaft Naturforschender Freunde zu Berlin (Februar): 29–34.
- 1891. "Süsswasser-Mollusken des malayischen Archipels und einen neuer Unio aus Borneo". Sitzungsberichte der Gesellschaft Naturforschender Freunde zu Berlin (Juni): 109–112.
- 1891. "Neue Art von Zonites von der Insel Cerigo". Sitzungsberichte der Gesellschaft Naturforschender Freunde zu Berlin (Juli): 148.
- 1892. "Über einige neue Arten von Land- und Süsswasser-Mollusken aus Uganda und dem Victoria-Nyansa". Sitzungsberichte der Gesellschaft Naturforschender Freunde zu Berlin (Februar): 15–19.
- 1892. "Ueber die von Dr. Stuhlmann in Nordost-Afrika gesammelten Land- und Süsswasser-Mollusken". Sitzungsberichte der Gesellschaft Naturforschender Freunde zu Berlin (November): 174–181.
- 1892. "Beschreibung vier neuer Afrikanischer Conchylien-Arten". Sitzungsberichte der Gesellschaft Naturforschender Freunde zu Berlin (November): 181–183.
- 1894. Description of a new Limicolaria. In: W.Kobelt, Die Genera Livihacia, Pseudachatina, Perideris, Limicolaria, und Homorus. In: Systematisches Conchylien-Cabinet von Martini und Chemnitz, vol. 1, 72
- 1894. "Afrikanische Binnenmollusken". Conchologische Mittheilungen. 3: 1–10.
- 1894. "Aus Südamerika". Conchologische Mittheilungen. 3: 10.
- 1894. "Landschnecken aus Neu-Guinea und den umliegenden Inseln". Conchologische Mittheilungen. 3: 10–16.
- 1894. Mollusken. In. Zoologische Forschungsreisen in Australien und dem malayischen Archipel, ser. Denkschriften der medicinisch-naturwissenschaftlichen Gesellschaft zu Jena, 8, vol. 5 Semon, R. ed., 83–96
- 1894. "Diagnose neuer Arten". Nachrichtenblatt der Deutschen Malakozoologischen Gesellschaft. 26: 135–136.
- 1894. "In Paraguay gesammelte Mollusken, insbesondere einige Varietäten von Odontostromus striatus". Sitzungsberichte der Gesellschaft Naturforschender Freunde zu Berlin (Juli): 163–170.
- 1894. "Neue Süsswasser-Conchylien aus Korea". Sitzungsberichte der Gesellschaft Naturforschender Freunde zu Berlin (Oktober): 207–217.
- 1895. "Esplorazione del Giuba e dei Suoi Affluenti compiuta dal Cap. V. Bottego durante gli anni 1892–93 sotto gli auspicii della Società Geografica Italiana. Risultati Zoologici. IV. Molluschi terrestri e d'aqua dolce". Annali del Museo Civico di Storia Naturale di Genova. 35: 63–66.
- 1895. "Description of a new species. In: H. Rolle, Beitrag zur Fauna von Mexiko". Nachrichtenblatt der Deutschen Malakozoologischen Gesellschaft. 27: 129–131.
- 1895. "Neue Land- und Süsswasser-Schnecken aus Ost-Afrika". Nachrichtenblatt der Deutschen Malakozoologischen Gesellschaft. 27: 175–187.
- 1895. "Mollusken von Paraguay". Sitzungsberichte der Gesellschaft Naturforschender Freunde zu Berlin (März): 33–35.
- 1895. "Neue Arten von Landschnecken aus den Gebirgen Ost-Afrikas". Sitzungsberichte der Gesellschaft Naturforschender Freunde zu Berlin (Juni): 120–129.
- 1895. "Neuer Buliminus aus Süd-Arabien". Sitzungsberichte der Gesellschaft Naturforschender Freunde zu Berlin (Juni): 129–130.
- 1895. "Einige ostafrikanische Achatinen". Sitzungsberichte der Gesellschaft Naturforschender Freunde zu Berlin (Juli): 145–146.
- 1896. "Landschnecken von den Inseln Lombok und Boneratu". Sitzungsberichte der Gesellschaft Naturforschender Freunde zu Berlin (Dezember): 157–165.
- 1897. Süss- und Brackwasser Mollusken des Indischen Archipels.. In. Zoologische Ergebnisse einer Reise in Niederländisch Ost-Indien, vol. 4 Weber, M. ed., 1–331
- 1897. Beschalte Weichthiere Deutsch-Ost-Afrikas. In: Deutsch-Ost-Afrika, vol. 4 Stuhlmann, F. ed.
- 1897. "Conchologische Miscellen II. 1. Ueber einige Olividen. 2. Columbella und Nassa. 3. Scalaria, Lippistes und Laciniorbis. 4. Voluta und Mitra". Archiv für Naturgeschichte. 63: 157–180.
- 1897. "Neue Arten und Varietäten". Nachrichtenblatt der Deutschen Malakozoologischen Gesellschaft. 29: 178–180.
- 1898. "Land- und Süsswasser-Mollusken der Seychellen nach den Sammlungen von Dr. Aug. Brauer". Mitteilungen aus der Zoologischen Sammlung des Museums für Naturkunde in Berlin. 1: 1–94. 1898.
- 1898. "Einige kleine Landschnecken von der Cocosinsel". Sitzungsberichte der Gesellschaft Naturforschender Freunde zu Berlin (November): 156–160.
- 1898. "Die Diagnosen dreier neuer Arten von Landschnecken aus Niederländisch-Indien". Sitzungsberichte der Gesellschaft Naturforschender Freunde zu Berlin (November): 160–161.
- 1899. Mollusca. In: Symbolae Physicae sei icones adhuc ineditae corporum naturalium novorum aut minus cognitorum quae ex per Libyam ... . Zoologica Carlgren, F., Hilgendorf, F., Martens, E.v., Matschie, P., Tornier, G. & Weltner, W. ed., 11–12
- 1899. "Conchologische Miscellen III. 1. Neue Land-Schnecken aus Niederländisch-Indien. 2. Binnen-Conchylien aus Ober-Birma. Archiv für Naturgeschichte 65": 27–48.

1900s

- 1900. "Über Land- und Süßwasserschnecken aus Sumatra. Nachrichtsblatt der Deutschen Malakozoologischen Gesellschaft 32": 1–18.
- 1900. "Ueber einige Landschnecken aus dem südwestl. Marokko". Nachrichtenblatt der Deutschen Malakozoologischen Gesellschaft. 32: 121–123.
- 1900. "Neue Fissurella aus Südbrasilien". Nachrichtenblatt der Deutschen Malakozoologischen Gesellschaft. 32: 187.
- 1900. "Einige neue Arten südafrikanischer Landschnecken". Sitzungsberichte der Gesellschaft Naturforschender Freunde zu Berlin (März): 117–119.
- 1900. "Einige neue von Dr. Füllborn in Deutsch-Ostafrika gesammelte Landschnecken". Sitzungsberichte der Gesellschaft Naturforschender Freunde zu Berlin (Oktober): 177–180.
- 1901. "Diagnosen neuer Arten". Nachrichtenblatt der Deutschen Malakozoologischen Gesellschaft. 33: 148–149.
- 1901. "Einige neue Meer-Conchylien von der deutschen Tiefsee-Expedition". Sitzungsberichte der Gesellschaft Naturforschender Freunde zu Berlin (Januar): 14–26.
- 1901. "Eine neue Süsswasserschnecke aus Kamerun". Sitzungsberichte der Gesellschaft Naturforschender Freunde zu Berlin (Januar): 26–27.
- 1902. "Neue Unioniden aus Tonkin und Anam". Nachrichtenblatt der Deutschen Malakozoologischen Gesellschaft. 34: 130–135.
- 1902. "Ueber einige Schnecken der Cocosinseln". Sitzungsberichte der Gesellschaft Naturforschender Freunde zu Berlin (März): 59–62.
- 1902. "Einige neue Arten von Meer-Conchylien aus den Sammlungen der deutschen Tiefseeexpedition unter der Leitung von Prof. Carl Chun 1898–99". Sitzungsberichte der Gesellschaft Naturforschender Freunde zu Berlin (November): 237–244.
- 1903. "Süsswasser-Conchylien vom Südufer des Tsad-Sees". Sitzungsberichte der Gesellschaft Naturforschender Freunde zu Berlin (Januar): 5–10.
- 1903. "Land- und Süsswasser-Conchylien von Ost-Borneo". Sitzungsberichte der Gesellschaft Naturforschender Freunde zu Berlin (November): 416–428.
- 1903. "Neue Meer-Conchylien aus den Sammlungen der deutschen Tiefseeexpedition". Nachrichtenblatt der Deutschen Malakozoologischen Gesellschaft. 35: 97–105.
- 1904. Die beschalten Gastropoden der deutschen Tiefsee-Expedition, 1898–1899.. In. A. Systematisch-geographischer Theil., vol. 7 Wissenschaftliche Ergebnisse der deutschen Tiefsee-Expedition auf dem Dampfer "Valdivia" 1898–1899, 1–146
- 1904. Anhang VII. Mollusken. In. Die Kalahari. Versuch einer physisch-geographischen Darstellung der Sandfelder des südafrikanischen Beckens Passarge, S. ed., 754–759
- 1905. "Koreanische Süsswasser-Mollusken". Zoologische Jahrbücher. 8: 23–70.
- 1908 (with Johannes Thiele). "Beschreibung einiger im östlichen Borneo von Dr. Martin Schmidt gesammelten Land- und Süsswasser-Conchylien". Mitteilungen aus dem Zoologischen Museum in Berlin. 4: 249–292.

== See also ==
- Category:Taxa named by Eduard von Martens
