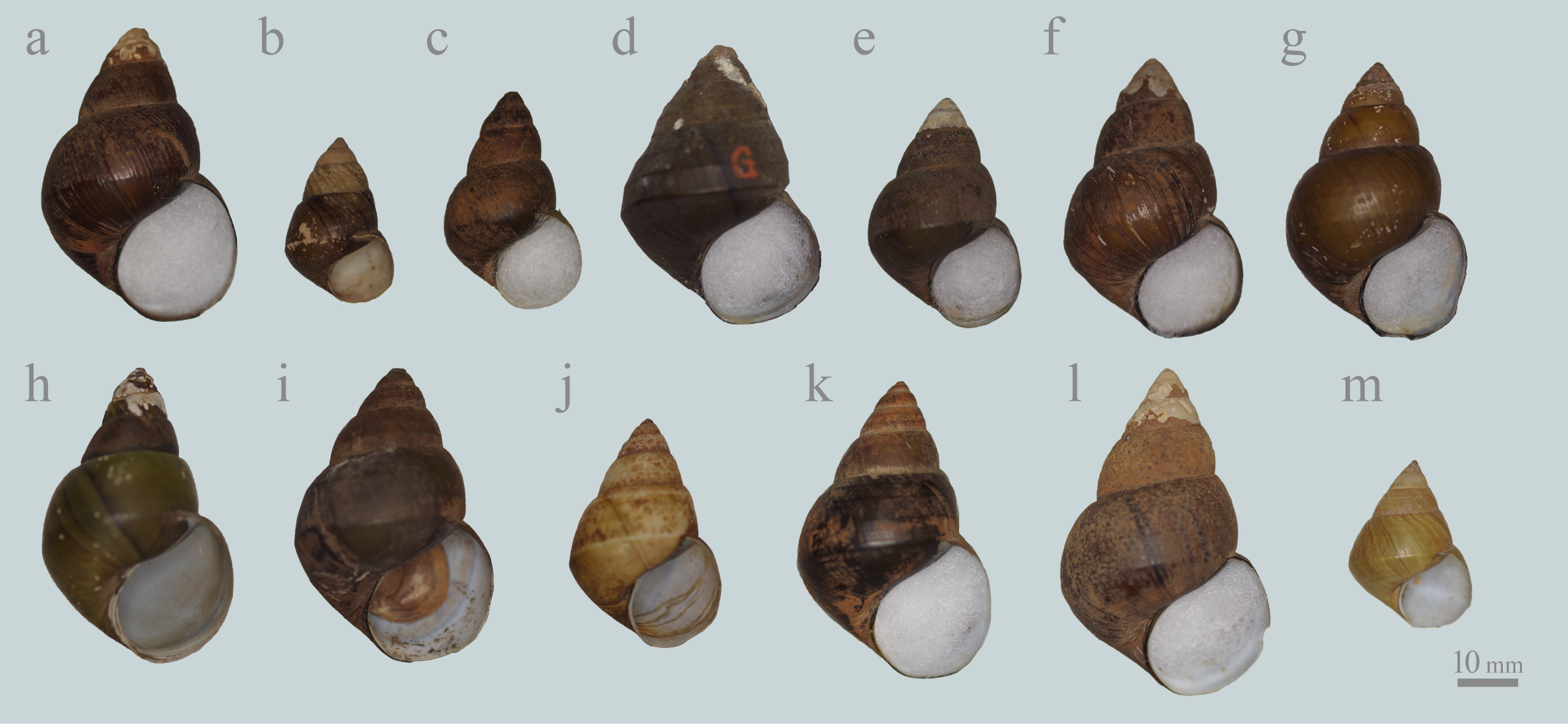

Scientific classification
- Kingdom: Animalia
- Phylum: Mollusca
- Class: Gastropoda
- Subclass: Caenogastropoda
- Order: Architaenioglossa
- Family: Viviparidae
- Genus: Heterogen
- Species: H. japonica

Binomial name
- Heterogen japonica E. von Martens, 1861

Synonyms
- † Basilissa laeviuscula Yokoyama, 1922 junior subjective synonym; Cipangopaludina japonica (E. von Martens, 1861) superseded combination; Paludina japonica E. von Martens, 1861 superseded combination; Vivipara sclateri von Frauenfeld, 1865 junior subjective synonym; Viviparus japonicus (E. von Martens, 1861) superseded combination; Viviparus japonicus var. iwakawa Pilsbry, 1902 junior subjective synonym

= Heterogen japonica =

Species of freshwater snail

Heterogen japonica, sometimes known as the Japanese mystery snail, is a species of freshwater snail in the family Viviparidae. While native to Japan, Korea, and Taiwan, the snail is invasive to the United States and possibly other countries.

== Description ==
Heterogen japonica has a large globose shell with an operculum covering its aperture. The shell typically has 7 to 8 whorls and a spire at a 50º to 55º angle. Along the outside of the shell are fine ridges. Juveniles have fine hairs along the periostracum. The color of the shells is typically brown or tan, typically getting darker as the snail ages.

H. japonica is commonly confused with Cipangopaludina chinensis, known as the Chinese mystery snail, due to many similarities in form and an overlapping invasive range.

== Habitat and distribution ==
Heterogen japonica has only been found in freshwater bodies, such as lakes, ponds, and slow-moving rivers. The substrates of its habitats are typically sandy to muddy with dense amounts of vegetation. Within their native range, they are often found in rice paddy fields.

The snail is native to Japan, Korea, and Taiwan, but has become invasive to at least the United States. H. japonica was first described in the United States in the late 1800s by biologist Willard M. Wood, who found possible specimens in Asian food markets in San Francisco. However, biologist Harold Hannibal later identified the specimens as another freshwater snail, Margarya laeta. Hannibal later found snails in an irrigation ditch in San Joaquin Valley that he identified as H. japonica, but the specimens were lost and cannot be verified. Due to similarities to Cipangopaludina chinensis and morphological variation with the species, it is possible that these reports were misidentifications. Along the east coast, H. japonica was first described in 1916 from a shell from the Muddy River, Boston, Massachusetts. The snail was first genetically identified through testing in the United States in 2000 along the east coast, and on the west coast in 2022. The cryptic morphology causes the possibility that its invasive range may be larger than reported, especially in regions where C. chinensis is invasive.

== Ecology ==
Heterogen japonica is a grazing snail that feeds mostly on bacterial materials, such as detritus and compost sludge. Its predators include crayfish, catfishes, gulls, racoons, and otters.

In regions where the snail is invasive, its presence can drastically reduce the population of native snails. This is in part due to interspecific competition over space and food. Another aspect is that H. japonica changes the nitrogen to phosphorus composition of the water, which changes the algal community structure that native snails rely on. H. japonica also does not have as much predation pressure as native snails. This ability to outcompete native species allows them to have great booms in population.
