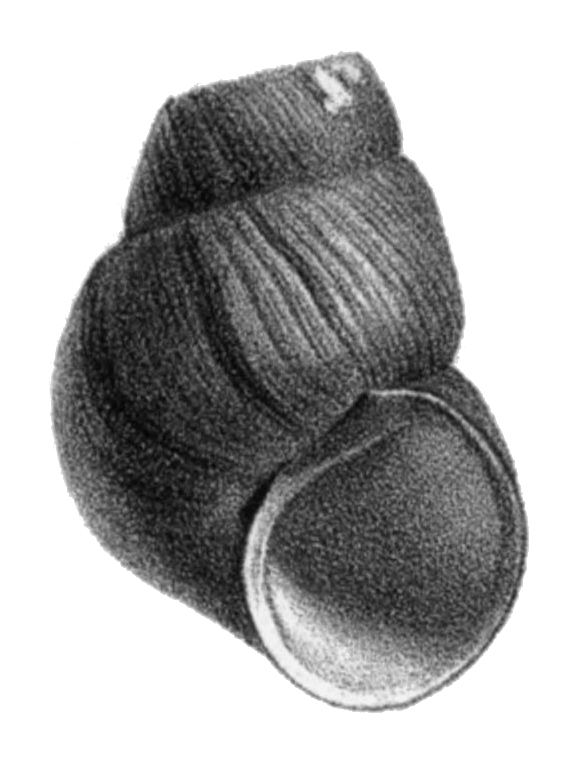
- Drawing of an apertural view of the shell of Amuropaludina pachya.

Conservation status
- Least Concern (IUCN 3.1)

Scientific classification
- Kingdom: Animalia
- Phylum: Mollusca
- Class: Gastropoda
- Subclass: Caenogastropoda
- Order: Architaenioglossa
- Family: Viviparidae
- Genus: Amuropaludina
- Species: A. pachya

Binomial name
- Amuropaludina pachya (Bourguignat, 1860)

Synonyms
- Vivipara pachya Bourguignat, 1860

= Amuropaludina pachya =

Species of gastropod

Amuropaludina pachya is a species of freshwater snail with a gill and an operculum, an aquatic gastropod mollusc in the family Viviparidae.

== Distribution ==
This species is found in the central and lower parts of the Amur River basin, in Russia. The type locality is the Amur River ("le fleuve Amour").

Major threats include river pollution.

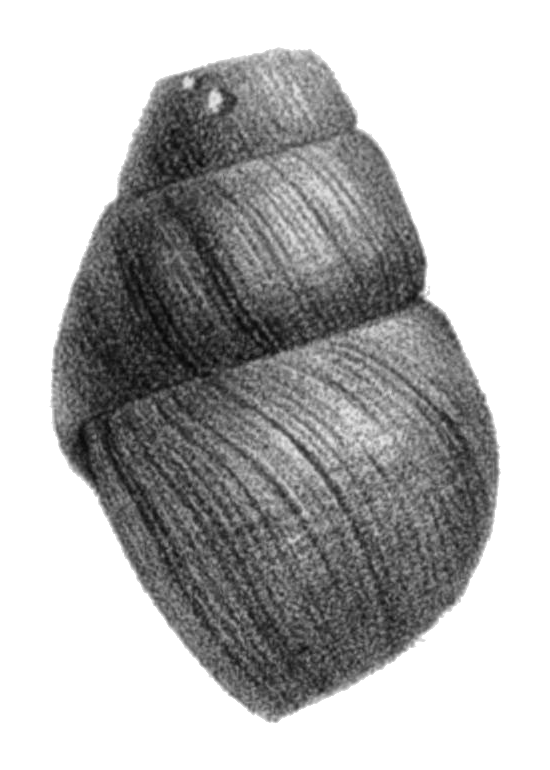
Drawing of a lateral view of the shell of Amuropaludina pachya

== Description ==
The width of the shell is 21 mm. The height of the shell is 34 mm.
