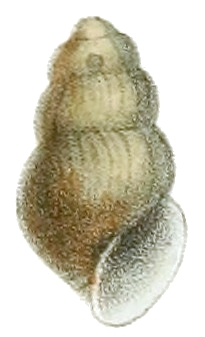
- An 1870 drawing of the shell of Lioplax cyclostomatiformis

Conservation status
- Vulnerable (IUCN 2.3)

- Endangered (ESA)

Scientific classification
- Kingdom: Animalia
- Phylum: Mollusca
- Class: Gastropoda
- Subclass: Caenogastropoda
- Order: Architaenioglossa
- Family: Viviparidae
- Genus: Lioplax
- Species: L. cyclostomatiformis

Binomial name
- Lioplax cyclostomatiformis I. Lea, 1841

Synonyms
- Lioplax cyclostomaformis

= Lioplax cyclostomatiformis =

Species of gastropod

Lioplax cyclostomatiformis, the cylindrical lioplax, is a species of freshwater snail with gills and an operculum, an aquatic gastropod mollusk in the family Viviparidae. This species is endemic to the United States.

== Description ==
The shell is elongated, reaching about 28 mm (1.1 in) in length. Shell color is light to dark olivaceous-green externally, and bluish inside of the aperture (shell opening).

The cylindrical lioplax is distinguished from other viviparid (eggs hatch internally and the young are born as juveniles) snails in the Mobile River Basin by the number of whorls, and differences in size, sculpture, microsculpture, and spire angle.

== Distribution ==
This species is endemic to the United States.

No other species of lioplax snails is known to occur in the Mobile River Basin.

Collection records for the cylindrical lioplax exist from the Alabama River (Dallas County, Alabama), Black Warrior River (Jefferson County, Alabama) and tributaries (Prairie Creek, Marengo County, Alabama; Valley Creek, Jefferson County, Alabama); Coosa River (Shelby, Elmore counties, Alabama) and tributaries (Oothcalooga Creek, Bartow County, Georgia; CoahuIla Creek, Whitfield County, Georgia; Annuchee Creek, Floyd County, Georgia; Little Wills Creek, Etowah County, Alabama; Choccolocco Creek, Talladega County, Alabama; Yellowleaf Creek, Shelby County, Alabama); and the Cahaba River (Bibb, Shelby counties, Alabama) and its tributary, Little Cahaba River (Jefferson County, Alabama).

A single collection of this species has also been reported from the Tensas River, Madison Parish, Louisiana; however, there are no previous or subsequent records outside of the Alabama-Coosa system, and searches of the Tensas River in Louisiana by Service biologists (1995) and others (Vidrine, 1996) have found no evidence of the species or its typical habitat.

The cylindrical lioplax is currently known only from about 24 km (15 mi) of the Cahaba River above the fall line in Shelby and Bibb Counties, Alabama. Survey efforts by Davis failed to locate this snail in the Coosa or Alabama Rivers, and more recent survey efforts have also failed to relocate the species at historic localities in the Alabama, Black Warrior, Little Cahaba, and Coosa Rivers and their tributaries.

It is listed as endangered in the United States Fish and Wildlife Service list of endangered species since October 28, 1998 (according to report 63FR57619).

== Ecology ==
Little is known of the biology or life history of the cylindrical lioplax.

=== Habitat ===
Habitat for the cylindrical lioplax is unusual for the genus, as well as for other genera of viviparid snails. It lives in isolated mud deposits found under large rocks in the rapid-flowing sections of stream and river shoals. Other Lioplax species are usually found along the margins of rivers in exposed muddy substrates.

=== Feeding habits ===
It is believed to brood its young and filter feed, as do other members of the Viviparidae.

=== Life ===
Life spans have been reported from 3 to 11 years in various species of Viviparidae.
