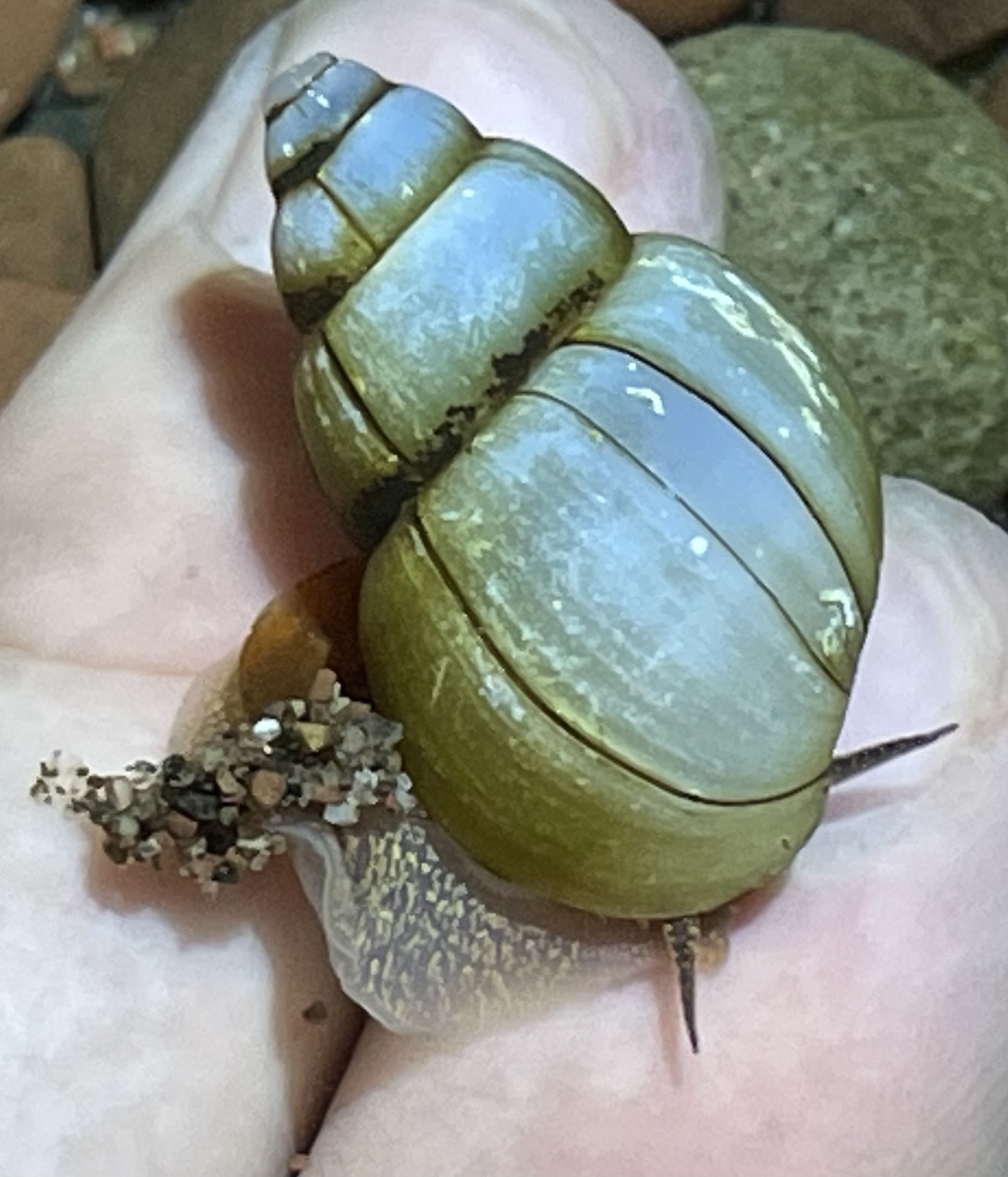

Conservation status
- Least Concern (IUCN 3.1)

- Secure (NatureServe)

Scientific classification
- Kingdom: Animalia
- Phylum: Mollusca
- Class: Gastropoda
- Subclass: Caenogastropoda
- Order: Architaenioglossa
- Family: Viviparidae
- Genus: Campeloma
- Species: C. decisum

Binomial name
- Campeloma decisum (Say, 1817)

= Campeloma decisum =

Species of gastropod

Campeloma decisum, commonly known as the pointed campeloma, is a species of freshwater snail in the family Viviparidae. It is native to lakes, streams, and rivers across eastern North America.

== Description ==
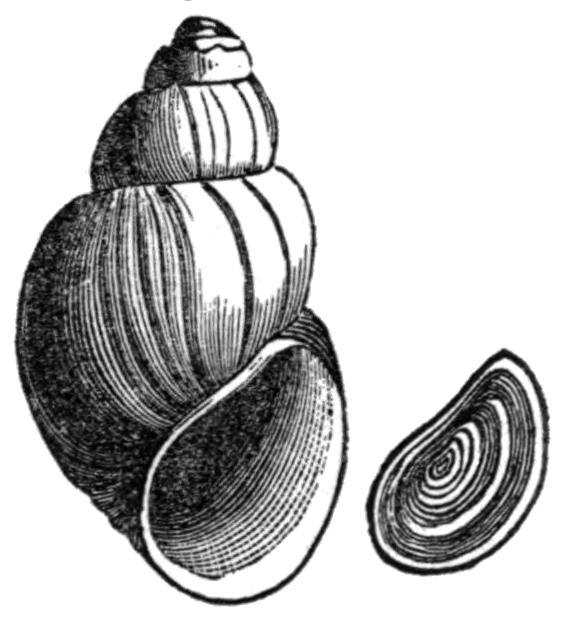
Drawing of the shell and operculum by W. H. Dall.

C. decisum can be found in varied freshwater ecosystems throughout the eastern United States and southeast Canada. The shell shape of this species is highly variable, and is dependent on various environmental factors such as pH, alkalinity, Secchi depth; and the concentration of ammonia, phosphate, and magnesium.

Individuals can live approximately three years and reach sexual maturity after one year. Historically, this species has been known to reproduce both sexually and asexually through parthenogenesis, with individual populations being composed of either males and females or entirely asexual females. Recent genetic studies have indicated that C. decisum likely represents two or more distinct taxa, with sexual populations being related to other sexual Campeloma species and asexual populations being related to the sexual C. geniculum and other asexual Campeloma species. This diversification likely occurred during the Miocene.

== Ecology ==
C. decisum is known for its tendency to burrow in order to shelter from predators like fish and diving ducks. As a result, they do not thrive in aquatic environments with hard substrates. The growth rate and ability of these snails to burrow is negatively affected by the presence of the invasive zebra mussel, Dreissena polymorpha. Known parasites of the species include the trematode Aspidogaster conchicola.
