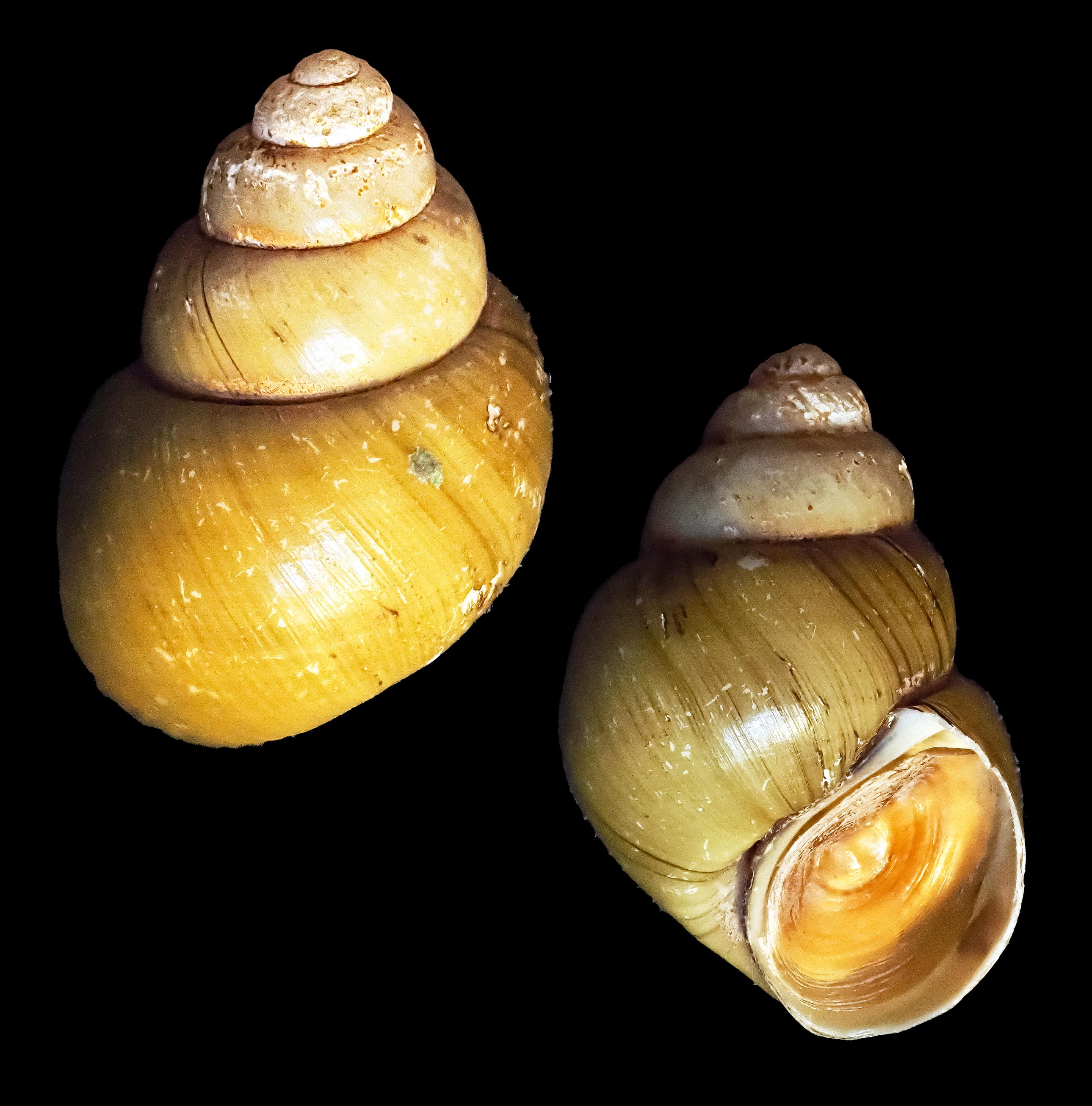
- Shell of Mekongia franzhuberi (holotype at MNHN, Paris)

Scientific classification
- Kingdom: Animalia
- Phylum: Mollusca
- Class: Gastropoda
- Subclass: Caenogastropoda
- Order: Architaenioglossa
- Superfamily: Viviparoidea
- Family: Viviparidae
- Subfamily: Bellamyinae
- Genus: Mekongia; Crosse & P. Fischer, 1876

Type species
- Paludina jullieni Deshayes, 1876

Synonyms
- Bellamya (Mekongia) Crosse & P. Fischer, 1876 (new combination); Paludina (Mekongia) Crosse & P. Fischer, 1876 (original combination)

= Mekongia =

Genus of molluscs

Mekongia is a genus of Viviparidae, a gastropoda mollusca in the subfamily Bellamyinae of the family Viviparidae.

The name of this genus comes from the Mekong river of Indochina peninsula.

== Species ==
As of 21 April 2022, WoRMS recorded the following species under Mekongia:

- Mekongia crassa (Benson, 1836)
- Mekongia franzhuberi Thach, 2021
- Mekongia jullieni (Deshayes, 1876)
- Mekongia lamarcki (Deshayes, 1876)
- Mekongia liuiana (Yen, 1937)
- Mekongia pongensis Brandt, 1968
- Mekongia rattei (Crosse & P. Fischer, 1876)
- Mekongia siamensis (Frauenfeld, 1865)
- Mekongia smithi (Yen, 1942)
- Mekongia sphaericula (Deshayes, 1876)
- Mekongia swainsoniana (I. Lea, 1856)

taxon inquirendum

- Mekongia bocourti (Mabille, 1889)
- Mekangia rivularia: possibly the synonym of Rivularia bicarinata, according to comment of referenced text.
- Mekongia turbinata (Deshayes, 1876)

synonyms

- Mekongia eyriesi (Morelet, 1865): synonym of Eyriesia eyriesi (Morelet, 1865) (superseded combination)
- Mekangia hunanensis Yen, 1942, named after the Hunan province of China, is now: synonym of Mekongia liuiana (Yen, 1937), a species of the same genus discovered by the same author earlier;
- Mekongia moreleti (Deshayes, 1876): synonym of Mekongia siamensis (Frauenfeld, 1865) (a junior synonym)
- Mekongia swainsoni (I. Lea, 1856): synonym of Mekongia swainsoniana (I. Lea, 1856) (incorrect subsequent spelling)
- Mekongia yunnanensis: named after the Yunnan province of China.
