= Angulyagra microchaetophora =

Conservation status
- Least Concern (IUCN 3.1)

Scientific classification
- Kingdom: Animalia
- Phylum: Mollusca
- Class: Gastropoda
- Subclass: Caenogastropoda
- Order: Architaenioglossa
- Family: Viviparidae
- Genus: Angulyagra
- Species: A. microchaetophora

Binomial name
- Angulyagra microchaetophora (Annandale, 1921)

Synonyms
- Vivipara microchaetophora Annandale, 1921

Species of gastropod

Angulyagra microchaetophora is a species of freshwater snail with a gill and an operculum, an aquatic gastropod mollusk in the family Viviparidae.

== Distribution ==
This species is found in Assam, Manipur and Nagaland states in India.

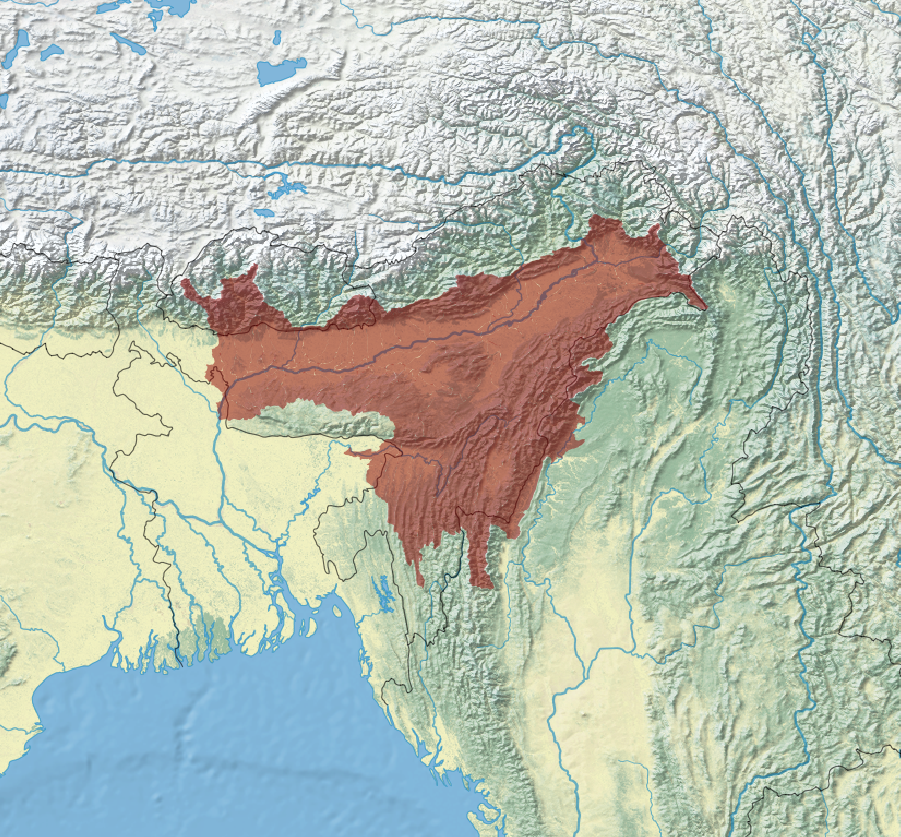
Distribution map of Angulyagra microchaetophora.
