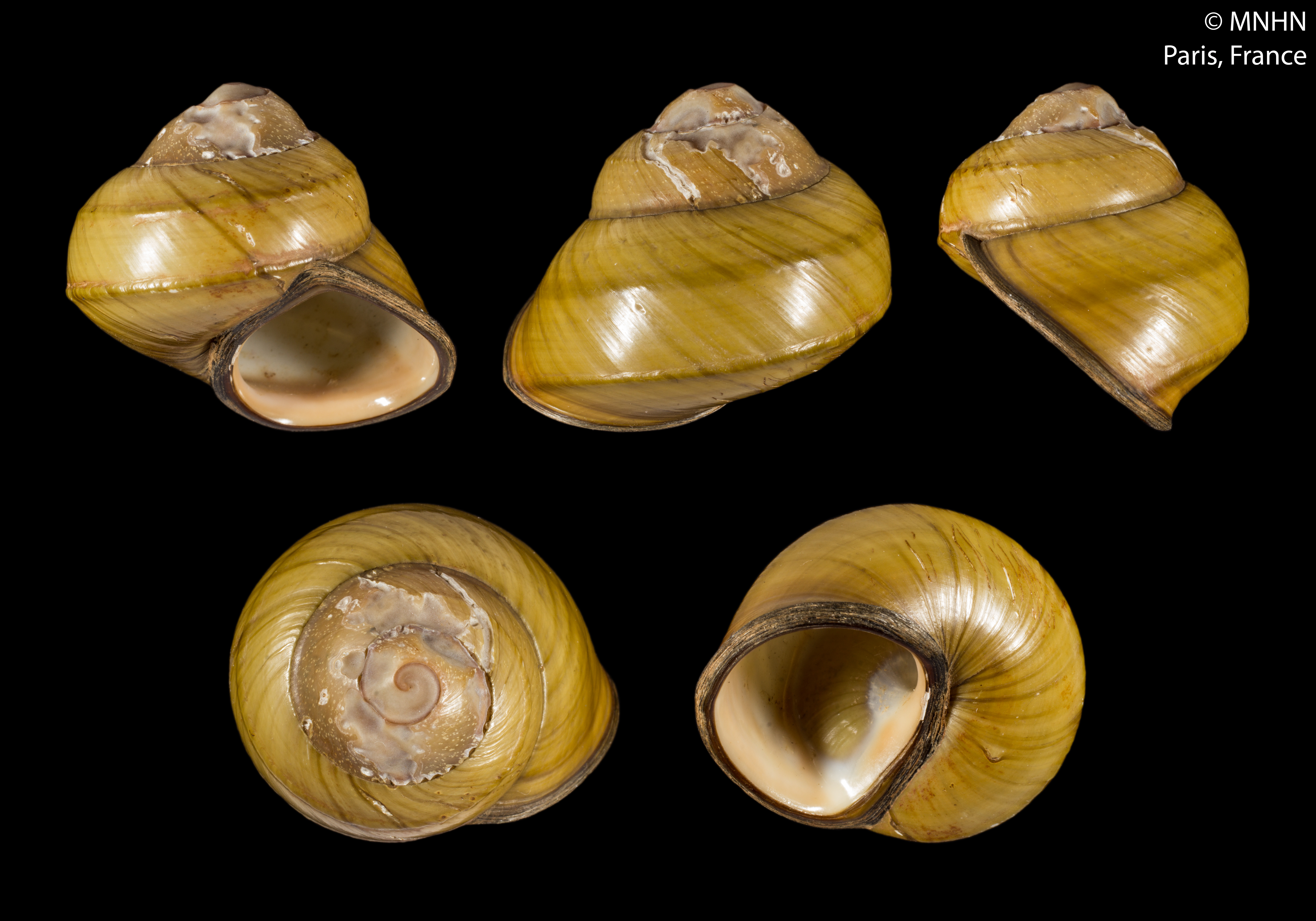
- Shell of Eyriesia eyriesi (syntype at MNHN, Paris)

Scientific classification
- Kingdom: Animalia
- Phylum: Mollusca
- Class: Gastropoda
- Subclass: Caenogastropoda
- Order: Architaenioglossa
- Superfamily: Viviparoidea
- Family: Viviparidae
- Genus: Eyriesia; P. Fischer, 1885

Type species
- Paludina eyriesi Morelet, 1865

= Eyriesia =

Genus of gastropods

Eyriesia is a genus of freshwater snails in the family Viviparidae.

There is one species in this genus: Eyriesia eyriesi (Morelet, 1865)
