= Sinotaia =

- Shell of Sinotaia aeruginosa

Scientific classification
- Kingdom: Animalia
- Phylum: Mollusca
- Class: Gastropoda
- Subclass: Caenogastropoda
- Order: Architaenioglossa
- Family: Viviparidae
- Subfamily: Bellamyinae
- Genus: Sinotaia; Haas, 1939

Genus of gastropods

Sinotaia is a genus of large operculate freshwater snails, aquatic gastropod molluscs in the family Viviparidae.

== Distribution ==
Distribution of the genus Sinotaia include southeast Asia.

== Species ==
Species within the genus Sinotaia include:

- Sinotaia acutecarinata (Yen, 1939)
- Sinotaia aeruginosa (Reeve, 1863)
- Sinotaia angularis (O. F. Müller, 1774)
- Sinotaia annulata (Yen, 1939)
- Sinotaia arturrolli Brandt, 1968
- † Sinotaia barboti (Sinzov, 1884)
- † Sinotaia bugensis (Gozhik in Gozhik & Prysjazhnjuk, 1978)
- Sinotaia datunensis Qian, Fang & He, 2014
- Sinotaia delavayana (Heude, 1890)
- Sinotaia dispiralis (Heude, 1890)
- Sinotaia ecarinata (Kobelt, 1909)
- Sinotaia guangdungensis (Kobelt, 1906)
- Sinotaia limnophila (Mabille, 1886)
- Sinotaia mandahlbarthi Brandt, 1968
- Sinotaia manhongensis (Zhang, Liu & Wang, 1981)
- Sinotaia margaryoides (Annandale, 1924)
- † Sinotaia nicopolis Datsenko, 2001
- Sinotaia papillapicula (Liu, Zhang & Wang, 1982)
- Sinotaia polyzonata (Frauenfeld, 1862) / Angulyagra polyzonata
- Sinotaia pyrificata (Heude, 1890)
- Sinotaia qionghaiensis Qian, Fang & He, 2014
- Sinotaia quadrata (Benson, 1842) - type species
- Sinotaia reevei (Dautzenberg & H. Fischer, 1905)
- Sinotaia turrita (Yen, 1939)
- Sinotaia xichangensis Qian, Fang & He, 2014

== See also ==
- Bellamya
