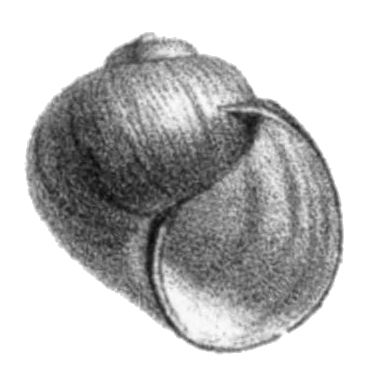
- Drawing of an apertural view of the shell of Amuropaludina chloantha.

Scientific classification
- Kingdom: Animalia
- Phylum: Mollusca
- Class: Gastropoda
- Subclass: Caenogastropoda
- Order: Architaenioglossa
- Family: Viviparidae
- Genus: Amuropaludina
- Species: A. chloantha

Binomial name
- Amuropaludina chloantha (Bourguignat, 1860)

Synonyms
- Vivipara chloantha Bourguignat, 1860

= Amuropaludina chloantha =

Species of gastropod

Amuropaludina chloantha is a species of freshwater snail with a gill and an operculum, an aquatic gastropod mollusc in the family Viviparidae.

== Distribution ==
This species is found in the Amur River basin, in Russia. The type locality is "various tributaries of the central part of the Amur River" ("divers affluents de l'Amour moyen").

== Description ==
The width of the shell is 16 mm. The height of the shell is 16 mm.

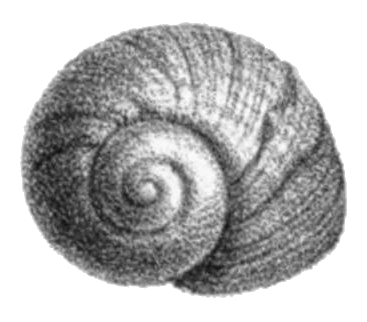
Drawing of apical view.

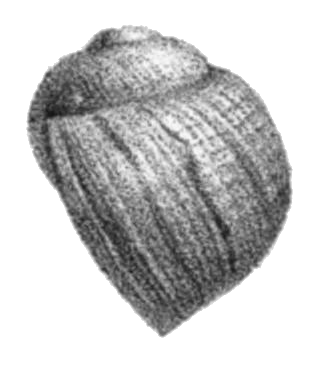
Drawing of lateral view.
