= Paludina chinensis =

Paludina chinensis may refer to two different species of molluscs:

- Paludina chinensis I. Lea, 1856, a taxonomic synonym for the species Sinotaia quadrata
- Paludina chinensis Gray, 1834, a taxonomic synonym for the Chinese mystery snail (Cipangopaludina chinensis)
