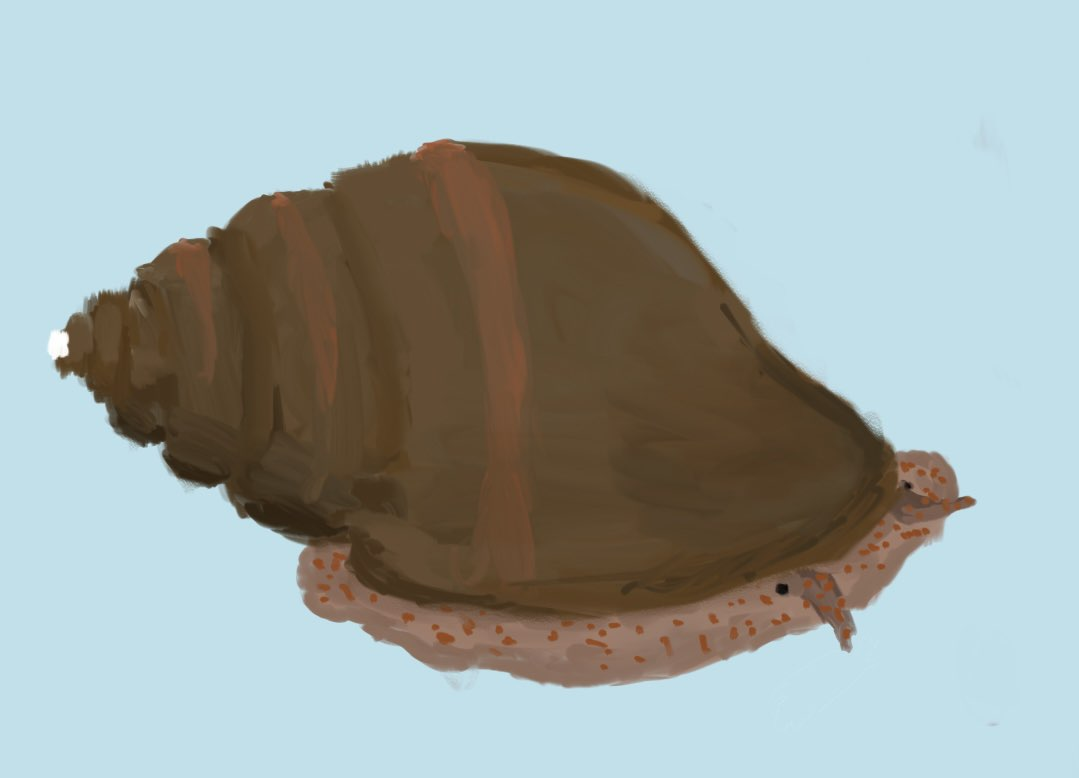
- Campeloma nebrascensis reconstruction

Scientific classification
- Domain: Eukaryota
- Kingdom: Animalia
- Phylum: Mollusca
- Class: Gastropoda
- Subclass: Caenogastropoda
- Order: Architaenioglossa
- Family: Viviparidae
- Genus: Campeloma
- Species: C. nebrascensis

Binomial name
- Campeloma nebrascensis Meek & Hayden, 1856

= Campeloma nebrascensis =

Campeloma nebrascensis Temporal range: Maastrichtian

Extinct species of freshwater snail

Campeloma nebrascensis is a species of extinct freshwater snail from the Maastrichtian (late Cretaceous) of North America. The species is distributed from Montana to Colorado, where extant Campeloma species live today.

== Etymology ==
Campeloma nebrascensis was named after the former Territory of Nebraska, located in the United States. The name of the territory "Nebraska" came from the Omaha-Ponca word "NiNbdhaska", which means "Flatwater", in reference to the Platte River.

== Discovery and history ==
Expeditions into the Territory of Louisiana had brought lots of new discoveries to American scientists in the first half of the 19th century. While expeditions such as the Lewis and Clark Expedition had made many discoveries of new plants and animals, the geology had apparently been overlooked by other explorers. By 1854, the Louisiana and other unorganized territories had been split into numerous other territories, one of them being the Territory of Nebraska.

Members of the species were first found during an 1853 expedition in the Nebraska territory, at the head waters of the Little Missouri River. This expedition was conducted by F. B. Meek and F. V. Hayden. The purpose of their expedition was to record the Tertiary and Cretaceous geology of the area. Campeloma nebrascensis was initially described in 1856, under the name Cerithium nebrascensis. Meek and Hayden would remark that the species was apparently closest to Cerithium granulosum (which was renamed to Bittium reticulatum).

== Distribution ==
The species is distributed from Montana to Colorado. It is known from 3 US states, the third being Wyoming. This species is known from the famous Hell Creek formation. The species would’ve inhabited freshwater ecosystems throughout its range in life. Modern Campeloma species inhabit much of North America.

== Life habits ==
=== Feeding ===
The exact feeding styles and behaviors of Campeloma nebrascensis are unknown. Many modern species in the genus Campeloma graze on algae. It is possible that these snails could filter feed similar to modern freshwater snails of the genus Viviparus

=== Reproduction ===
Campeloma nebrascensis reproduced similar to modern viviparous snails. Parthenogenesis has been observed in modern Campeloma species.
