= Rivularia =

Rivularia is the scientific name of two genera of organisms and may refer to:

- Rivularia (cyanobacteria), a genus of cyanobacteria in the family Rivulariaceae
- Rivularia (gastropod), a genus of snails in the family Viviparidae
