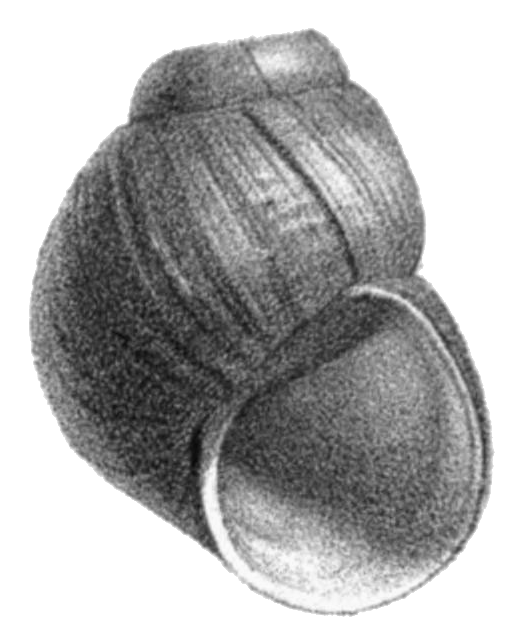
- Drawing of an apertural view of the shell of Amuropaludina praerosa.

Conservation status
- Least Concern (IUCN 3.1)

Scientific classification
- Kingdom: Animalia
- Phylum: Mollusca
- Class: Gastropoda
- Subclass: Caenogastropoda
- Order: Architaenioglossa
- Family: Viviparidae
- Genus: Amuropaludina
- Species: A. praerosa

Binomial name
- Amuropaludina praerosa (Gerstfeldt, 1859)

Synonyms
- Paludina praerosa Gerstfeldt, 1859

= Amuropaludina praerosa =

Species of gastropod

Amuropaludina praerosa is a species of freshwater snail with a gill and an operculum, an aquatic gastropod mollusk in the family Viviparidae.

Amuropaludina praerosa is the type species of the genus Amuropaludina.

== Distribution ==
This species is found in the Amur River basin, in Russia. The type locality is the middle Amur River.

Major threats include river pollution.

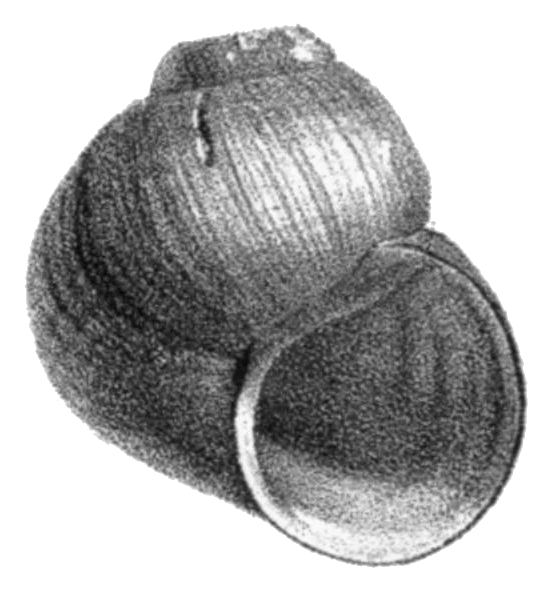
Drawing of an apertural view of the shell of Amuropaludina praerosa
