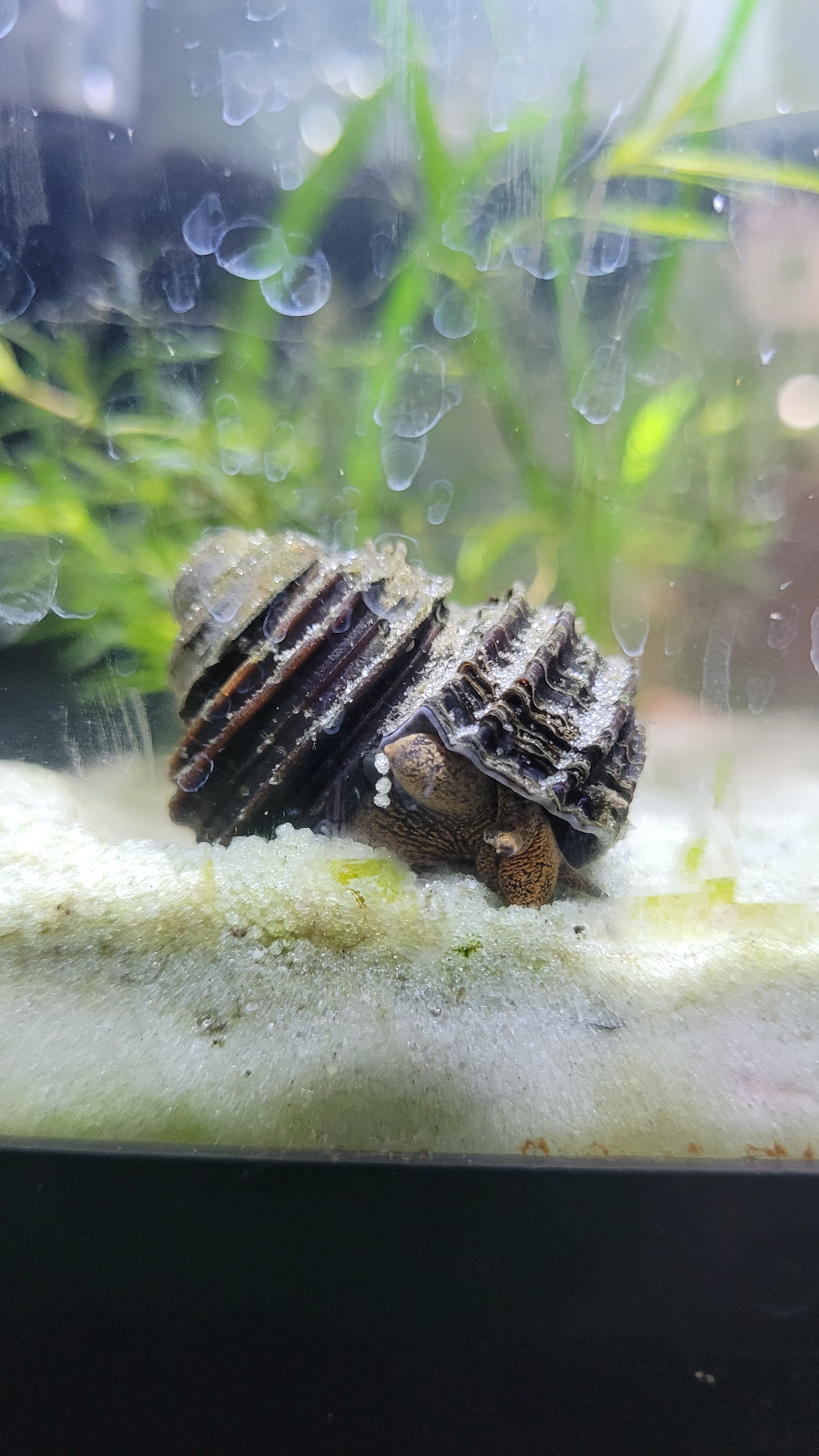

Scientific classification
- Kingdom: Animalia
- Phylum: Mollusca
- Class: Gastropoda
- Subclass: Caenogastropoda
- Order: Architaenioglossa
- Family: Viviparidae
- Subfamily: Bellamyinae
- Genus: Celetaia; Clench, 1966
- Species: C. persculpta

Binomial name
- Celetaia persculpta (P. Sarasin & F. Sarasin, 1897)

Synonyms
- Vivipara persculpta P. Sarasin & F. Sarasin, 1897

= Celetaia =

Genus of freshwater snails

Celetaia persculpta, sometimes referred to as blue turbo snail or freshwater turbo sail, is a species of freshwater snail with a gill and an operculum, in the "river snail" family Viviparidae. It is the only species in the genus Celetaia. They are endemic to Lake Poso on Sulawesi, preferring fine substrate, which they dig and sift through to find food. C. persculpta was first described by Paul Benedict Sarasin and Karl Friedrich Sarasin in 1898. Despite the common name, they are not related to the marine genus Turbo. Because of their popularity in the aquarium hobby, there is concern that the natural population may decline.

Celetaia persculpta are considered medium-sized snails, with shells averaging 1-2 inches in length. They have thick-walled, conical shells with deeply grooved whorls. Shells are dark gray to brown, and bodies are either yellow-orange, or black. They are peaceful omnivores that feed on detritus, biofilm and algae, and filter plankton from the water.

Celetaia persculpta are non-hermaphroditic (the sexes are distinct), and are viviparous. There is not a lot of scientific information available regarding this species, but in captivity they live for about 5 years.

Blue turbo snails are considered slow-moving, even for snails.
