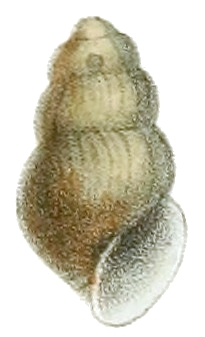
- 1870 drawing of a shell of Lioplax cyclostomatiformis

Scientific classification
- Kingdom: Animalia
- Phylum: Mollusca
- Class: Gastropoda
- Subclass: Caenogastropoda
- Order: Architaenioglossa
- Family: Viviparidae
- Subfamily: Lioplacinae
- Genus: Lioplax; Troschel, 1857

= Lioplax =

Genus of gastropods

Lioplax is a genus of freshwater snails with a gill and an operculum, an aquatic gastropod mollusk in the family Viviparidae.

== Species ==
Species within the genus Lioplax include:

- L. choctawhatchensis (Vanatta, 1935)
- L. cyclostomatiformis (I. Lea, 1844)
- L. pilsbryi (B. Walker, 1905)
- L. subcarinata (Say, 1817)
- L. sulculosa (Menke, 1828)
