= Pliopholygidae =

Scientific classification
- Kingdom: Animalia
- Phylum: Mollusca
- Class: Gastropoda
- Subclass: Caenogastropoda
- Order: Architaenioglossa
- Superfamily: Viviparoidea
- Family: †Pliopholygidae; Taylor, 1966

Extinct family of gastropods

Pliopholygidae is an extinct family of operculate freshwater snails, aquatic gastropod molluscs in the informal group Architaenioglossa.
