= Angulyagra =

Scientific classification
- Domain: Eukaryota
- Kingdom: Animalia
- Phylum: Mollusca
- Class: Gastropoda
- Subclass: Caenogastropoda
- Order: Architaenioglossa
- Family: Viviparidae
- Genus: Angulyagra; Rao, 1931

Genus of snails

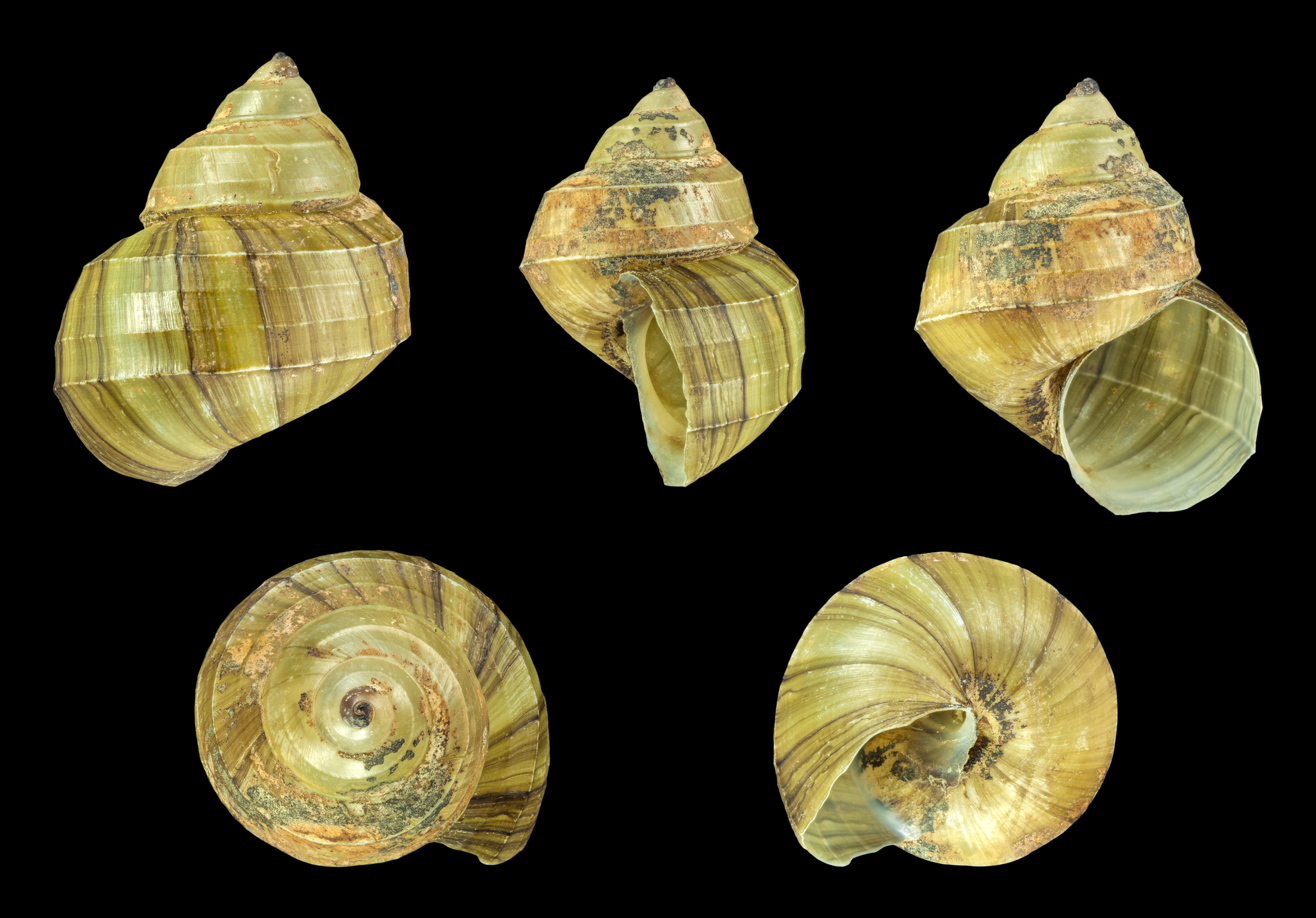
Angulyagra misamisensis. Mindanao, Philippines

Angulyagra is a genus of gastropods belonging to the family Viviparidae.

The species of this genus are found in Southern Asia.

Species:

- Angulyagra boettgeri (Heude, 1890)
- Angulyagra burroughiana (I.Lea, 1834)
- Angulyagra costata (Quoy & Gaimard, 1834)
- Angulyagra duchieri (H.Fischer, 1898)
- Angulyagra microchaetophora (Annandale, 1921)
- Angulyagra misamisensis (Bartsch, 1907)
- Angulyagra oxytropis (Benson, 1836)
- Angulyagra pagodula (Bartsch, 1907)
- Angulyagra partelloi (Bartsch, 1909)
- Angulyagra philippinensis (G.Nevill, 1885)
- Angulyagra polyzonata (Frauenfeld, 1862)
- Angulyagra thersites (Reeve, 1864)
- Angulyagra turritella Youluo, 1978
- Angulyagra voskresenskiana Popova, 1964
- Angulyagra wilhelmi (Yen, 1939)
