= Larina =

Scientific classification
- Kingdom: Animalia
- Phylum: Mollusca
- Class: Gastropoda
- Subclass: Caenogastropoda
- Order: Architaenioglossa
- Family: Viviparidae
- Subfamily: Bellamyinae
- Genus: Larina; A. Adams, 1855

Type species
- Larina strangei A. Adams, 1855

Synonyms
- Centrapala Cotton, 1935; Eularina Iredale, 1943 (unnecessary replacement name for Larina, by Iredale treated as a junior homonym of Larinus Germar, 1824)

Genus of gastropods

Larina is a genus of large operculate freshwater snails, aquatic gastropod molluscs in the family Viviparidae.

== Species ==
Species within the genus Larina include

- Larina lirata (Tate, 1885)
- Larina strangei A. Adams, 1855

Species brought into synonymy

- Larina turbinata Gatliff & Gabriel, 1909: synonym of Larinopsis turbinatus (Gatliff & Gabriel, 1909)
