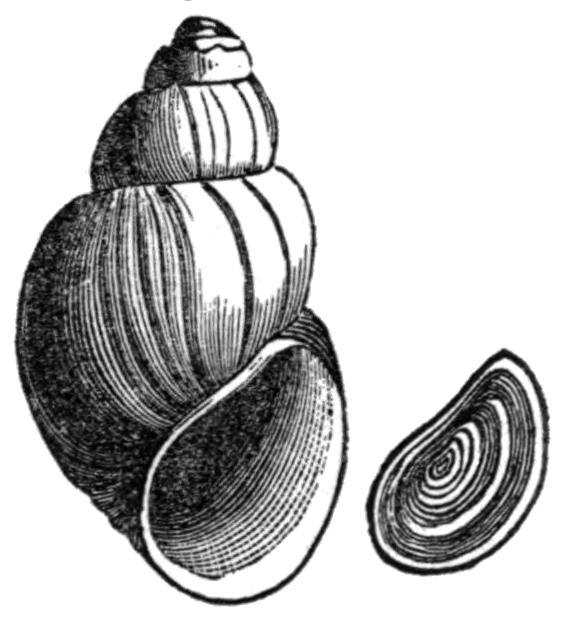
- Drawing of a shell and operculum of Campeloma decisum

Scientific classification
- Kingdom: Animalia
- Phylum: Mollusca
- Class: Gastropoda
- Subclass: Caenogastropoda
- Order: Architaenioglossa
- Family: Viviparidae
- Subfamily: Lioplacinae
- Genus: Campeloma; Rafinesque, 1819

= Campeloma =

Genus of gastropods

Campeloma is a genus of gilled operculate freshwater snails in the family Viviparidae.

== Distribution ==
They are common in unpolluted rivers in the eastern United States and southeastern Canada.

== Species ==
Species within the genus Campeloma include:

- † Campeloma acroterion J. H. Hartman, 2015
- Campeloma brevispirum F. C. Baker, 1928
- Campeloma crassula Rafinesque, 1819 – ponderous campeloma
- Campeloma decampi (W. G. Binney, 1865) – the slender campeloma
- Campeloma decisum (Say, 1817) – pointed campeloma
- Campeloma exile (Anthony, 1860)
- Campeloma floridense Call, 1886 – purple-throat campeloma
- Campeloma geniculum (Conrad, 1834) – ovate campeloma
- Campeloma gibbum (Currier, 1867)
- Campeloma leptum Mattox, 1940
- Campeloma lewisi Walker, 1915
- Campeloma limum (Anthony, 1860) – file campeloma
- Campeloma milesi (I. Lea, 1863)
- Campeloma nebrascensis (Meek & Hayden, 1856)
- Campeloma parthenum Vail, 1979 – maiden campeloma
- Campeloma regulare (I. Lea, 1841) – cylinder campeloma
- Campeloma rufum (Haldeman, 1841)
- Campeloma subsolidum Anthony – anatomy
- Campeloma tannum Mattox, 1940
