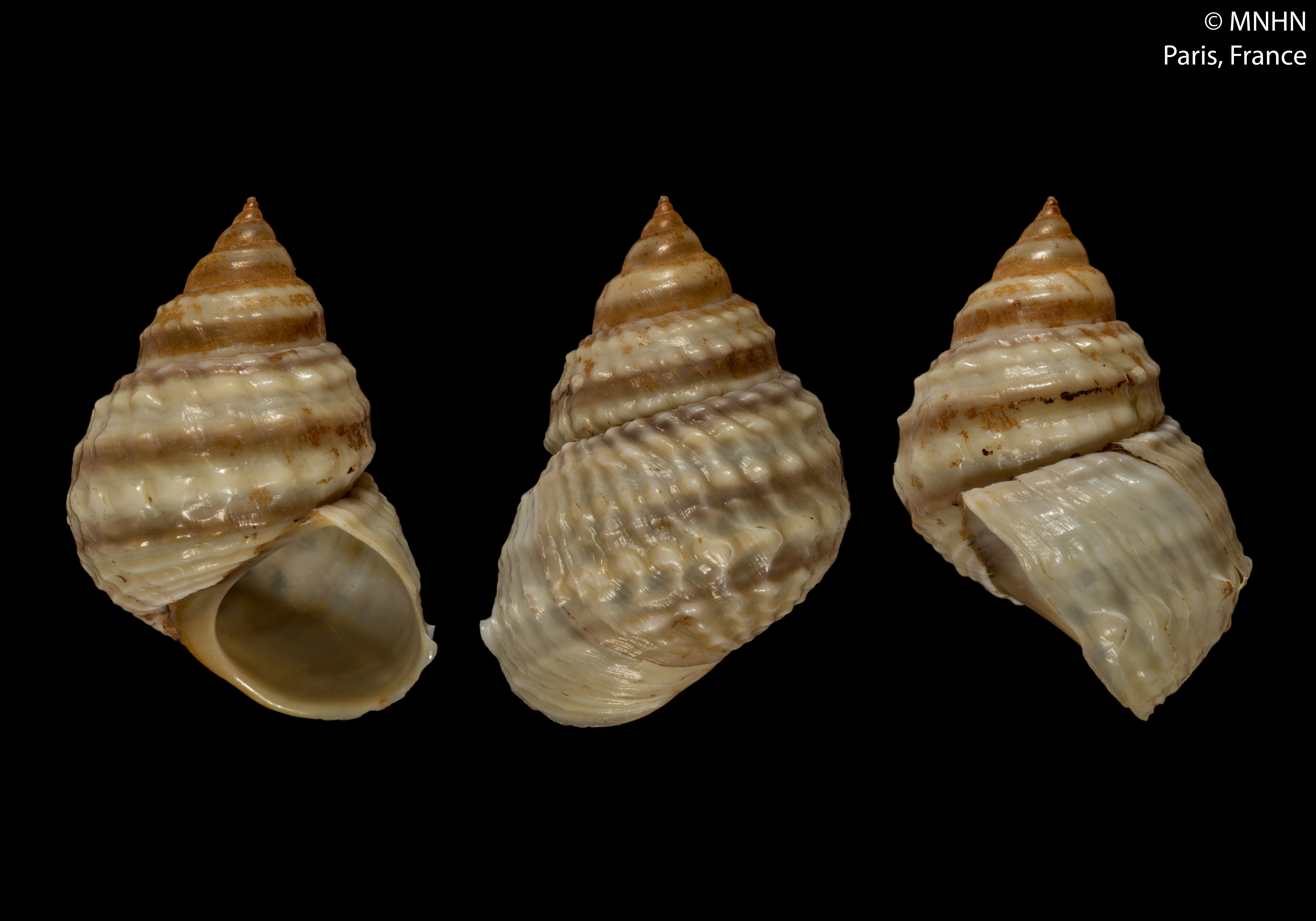
- Shell of Boganmargarya huberi (holotype at MNHN, Paris)

Scientific classification
- Domain: Eukaryota
- Kingdom: Animalia
- Phylum: Mollusca
- Class: Gastropoda
- Subclass: Caenogastropoda
- Order: Architaenioglossa
- Family: Viviparidae
- Genus: Boganmargarya; Thach, 2018
- Species: B. huberi

Binomial name
- Boganmargarya huberi Thach, 2018

= Boganmargarya =

Genus of gastropods

Boganmargarya is a genus of freshwater snails in the family Viviparidae. There is one species in this genus: Boganmargarya huberi.
