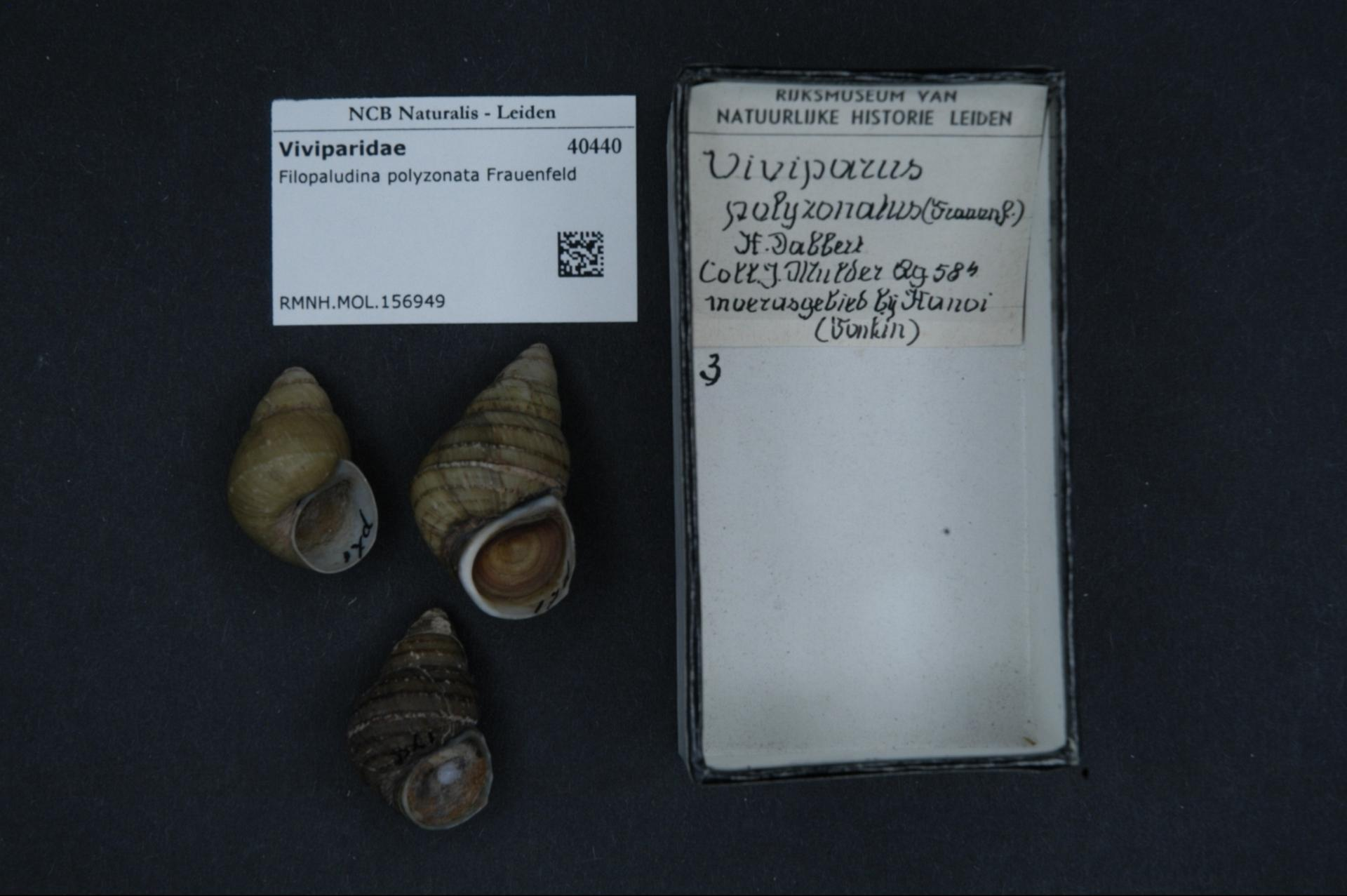
- Angulyagra polyzonata shells

Conservation status
- Least Concern (IUCN 3.1)

Scientific classification
- Kingdom: Animalia
- Phylum: Mollusca
- Class: Gastropoda
- Subclass: Caenogastropoda
- Order: Architaenioglossa
- Family: Viviparidae
- Genus: Angulyagra
- Species: A. polyzonata

Binomial name
- Angulyagra polyzonata (Frauenfeld, 1862)

Synonyms
- Sinotaia polyzonata Frauenfeld, 1862; Taia polyzonata (Fravenfeld, 1862); Vivipara polyzonata Kobelt, 1909; Viviparus polyzonata Kobelt, 1909; Filopaludina polyzonata

= Angulyagra polyzonata =

Species of gastropod

Angulyagra polyzonata is a species of a freshwater snail with a gill and an operculum, an aquatic gastropod mollusk in the family Viviparidae.

== Distribution ==
This species is found in southern and southeastern China and in northern Vietnam. It is non-indigenous in Taiwan.

== Description ==
The width of the shell is 11.2–21.4 mm. The height of the shell is 13.8–32.5 mm.

Similar species is Bellamya heudei.

== Ecology ==
=== Habitat ===
Angulyagra polyzonata lakes, rivers, creeks and drains. It is a common species in aquaculture ponds.

=== Parasites and predators ===
Angulyagra polyzonata is a host of a trematode Multicotyle purvisi.

Predators of Angulyagra polyzonata include the black carp Mylopharyngodon piceus.

== Human use ==
This species is eaten by people and it is used as fish, poultry and livestock raising. It is usually collected from the aquaculture pond when the pond is empty.
