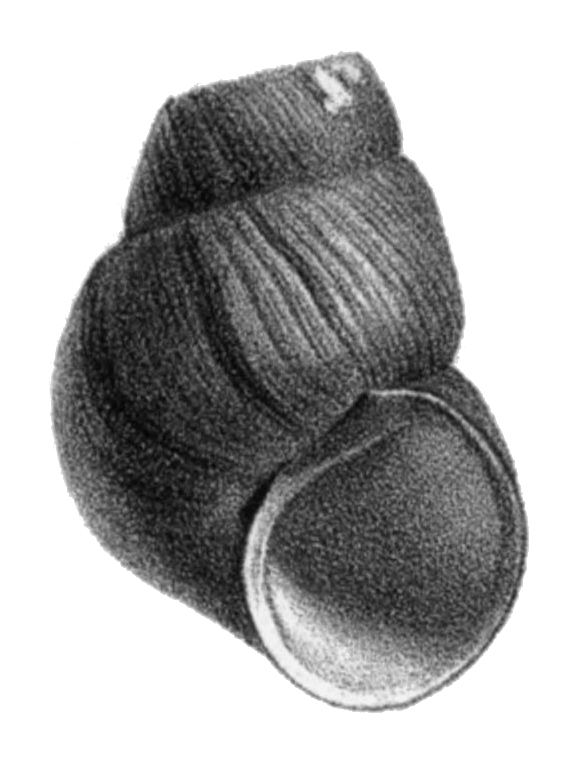
- Drawing of an apertural view of the shell of Amuropaludina pachya.

Scientific classification
- Kingdom: Animalia
- Phylum: Mollusca
- Class: Gastropoda
- Subclass: Caenogastropoda
- Order: Architaenioglossa
- Family: Viviparidae
- Subfamily: Bellamyinae
- Genus: Amuropaludina; Moskvicheva, 1979

= Amuropaludina =

Genus of gastropods

Amuropaludina is a genus of freshwater snails which have a gill and an operculum, aquatic gastropod molluscs in the family Viviparidae.

== Species ==
Species within the genus Amuropaludina include:

- Amuropaludina chloantha (Bourguignat, 1860)
- Amuropaludina pachya (Bourguignat, 1860)
- Amuropaludina praerosa (Gerstfeldt, 1859) - type species
