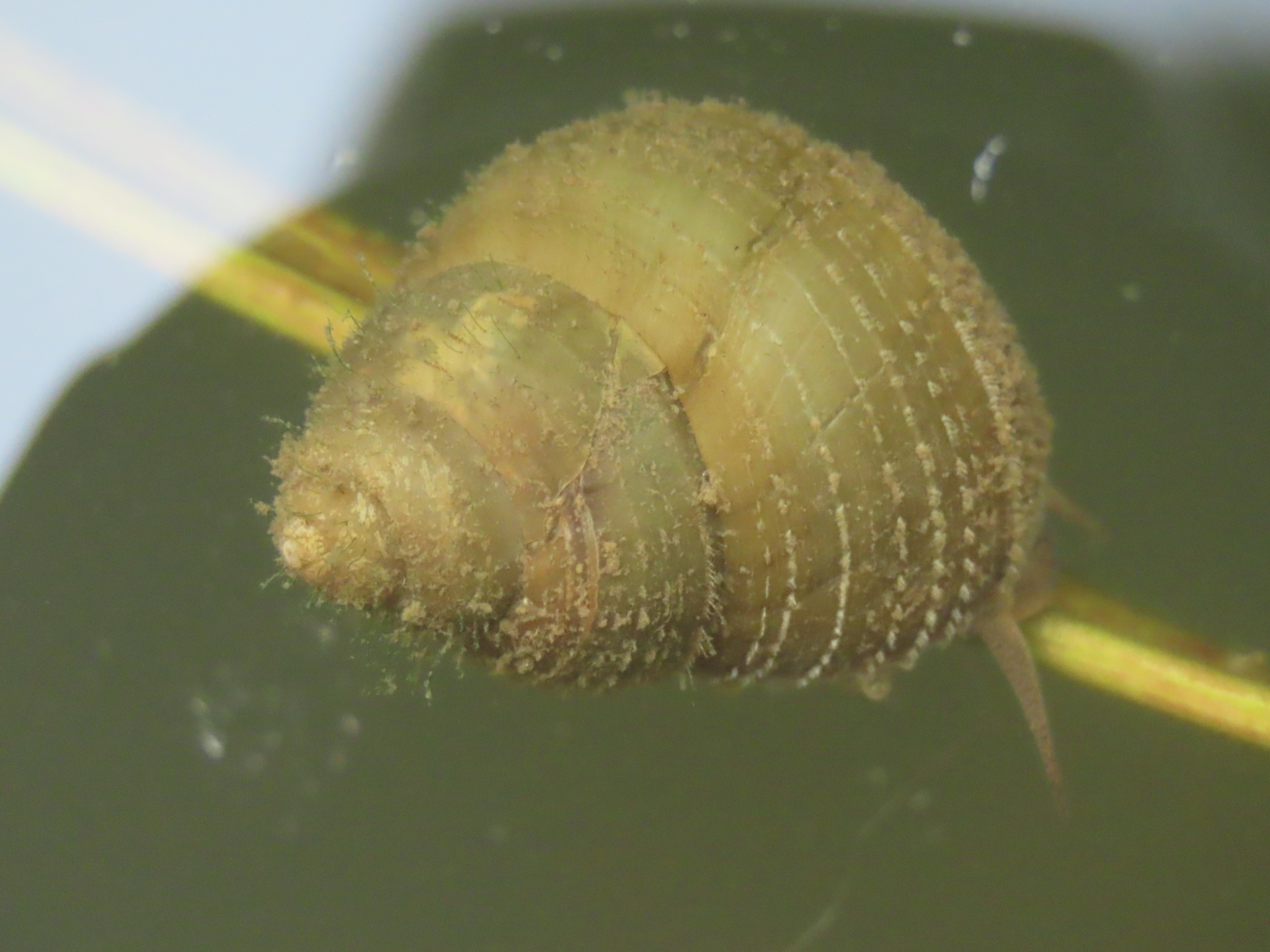

Conservation status
- Least Concern (IUCN 3.1)

Scientific classification
- Kingdom: Animalia
- Phylum: Mollusca
- Class: Gastropoda
- Subclass: Caenogastropoda
- Order: Architaenioglossa
- Family: Viviparidae
- Genus: Sinotaia
- Species: S. quadrata

Binomial name
- Sinotaia quadrata (Benson, 1842)

Synonyms
- List: Bellamya aeruginosa (Reeve, 1863); Bellamya lapidea (Heude, 1889); Bellamya lapillorum (Heude, 1890); Bellamya purificata (Heude, 1890); †Bithinia viviparoides Hsü, 1936; Paludina aeruginosa Reeve, 1863; Paludina chinensis I. Lea, 1856; Paludina dispiralis Heude, 1890; Paludina fantozatiana Heude, 1890; Paludina lapidea Heude, 1889; Paludina lapillorum Heude, 1890; Paludina orientalis I. Lea, 1866; Paludina purificata Heude, 1890; Paludina quadrata W. H. Benson, 1842; Paludina quadrata var. heudei Dautzenberg & H. Fischer, 1905; Sinotaia aeruginosa (Reeve, 1863); Sinotaia dispiralis (Heude, 1890); Sinotaia lapidea (Heude, 1889); Sinotaia lapillorum (Heude, 1890); Sinotaia purificata (Heude, 1890); Sinotaia pyrificata (Heude, 1890); Sinotaia turrita (Yen, 1939); Vivipara heudei Dautzenberg & H. Fischer, 1905; Vivipara lapillorum (Heude, 1890); Vivipara quadrata (W. H. Benson, 1842); Vivipara quadrata var. fantozatiana (Heude, 1890); Vivipara quadrata var. purificata (Heude, 1890); Viviparus quadratus (W. H. Benson, 1842); Viviparus quadratus aeruginosus (Reeve, 1863); Viviparus quadratus dispiralis (Heude, 1890); Viviparus quadratus turritus Yen, 1939

= Sinotaia quadrata =

Sinotaia quadrata Temporal range: Upper Pleistocene-recent

Species of mollusc

Sinotaia quadrata is a species of a freshwater snail with a gill and an operculum, an aquatic gastropod mollusk in the family Viviparidae. It is widely distributed and common species in China and in northern Vietnam inhabiting various shallow freshwater habitats, where it can reach high densities. It is a keystone species in its habitat and can significantly affect water quality and phytoplankton communities. It is commonly used in Chinese cuisine.

== Taxonomy ==
This species was described under the name Paludina quadrata by English conchologist William Henry Benson in 1842. It is now classified in the genus Sinotaia, although Chinese malacologists use the synonym Bellamya aeruginosa.

=== Subspecies ===
Two subspecies are recognised:

- Sinotaia quadrata histrica (Gould, 1859)
- Sinotaia quadrata quadrata (W. H. Benson, 1842)

== Distribution and habitat ==
=== Distribution ===
This species is found in:

- Japan
- Northeast Thailand（Isan）
- China.
- Vietnam
- Italy (river Arno; non-native)
- Argentina (Central Argentina; non-native)

This species is also known from Upper Pleistocene of China. The species' distribution appears to have shrunk from the Middle Pleistocene to the Late Pleistocene, while a range expansion occurred in the Holocene.

It is one of the most common species in China. It is common in the Yangtze River and Yellow River basins. The distribution of S. quadrata includes East China (Anhui, Fujian, Jiangsu, Jiangxi, Shandong, Shanghai, Zhejiang), Northeast China (Heilongjiang, Jilin, Liaoning), North China (Beijing, Hebei, Inner Mongolia, Shanxi, Tianjin), Northwest China (Ningxia, Shaanxi), Central China (Henan, Hubei, Hunan), Southwest China (Chongqing, Guizhou, Sichuan, Yunnan) and South China (Guangdong, Guangxi, Hainan). In Vietnam it is also common, but rarely reaches very high population densities.

=== Habitat ===
Sinotaia quadrata is found in rivers and lakes. It inhabits rice paddies, lakes, pools, slow flowing rivers, streams, ditches, ponds, and canals called khlongs in Vietnam. It has a benthic lifestyle and lives mainly in shallow littoral areas, usually in soft mud rich in organic matter. It can actively glide over the sediment or bury into it. This species is not actively migrating, rather its dispersal appears to be caused passively by floods, animals (zoochory), and accidentally by humans. The species prefers water temperatures typical of subtropical habitats, e.g., 6 to 30.1 °C (42.8 to 86.2 °F) in Lake Tai.

Populations can reach densities of up to 400 snails/m^{2}. It is similarly dominant in Lake Tai.

S. quadrata has been found to respond well to laboratory conditions with a water temperature of 24 °C (75 °F), pH 8 and a 1:4 ratio of sediment to water.

Populations of S. quadrata at high densities are able to alter the physicochemical features of water. They decrease the concentration of chlorophyll a and thus directly increase water transparency. This indirectly decreases the concentration of dissolved oxygen through consumption of oxygen-producing algae. The species affects the composition of the phytoplankton community by decreasing the biomass of mostly toxic cyanobacteria and flagellates and promoting the biomass of mostly colonial green algae. Nitrogen concentrations may also be decreased. Its pronounced effect on water chemistry and community composition makes S. quadrata a keystone species in its habitat.

The pollution tolerance value is 6 (on scale 0–10; 0 is the best water quality, 10 is the worst water quality).

== Description ==
S. quadrata breathes with gills. The right tentacle is thickened in the male but not the female. The dry weight of composition of this species is as follows: 28.6% foot, 23.06% intestine, 9.78% gonad, 8.58% hepatopancreas, 29.98% other tissue. The diploid chromosome number of Sinotaia quadrata is 2n=16.

The height of the shell is 20–30 mm (0.79–1.18 in), with both sexes having identical shell dimensions. Adults snails have shell of greater height than width. The shells of newborn snails are 2.93–3.70 mm (0.115–0.146 in) long, and differ from those of adults in being wider than high. The snail including the shell has a weight of about 2.8 g (0.099 oz).

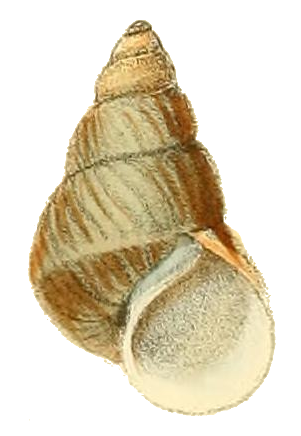
Drawing from the type description, apertural view.

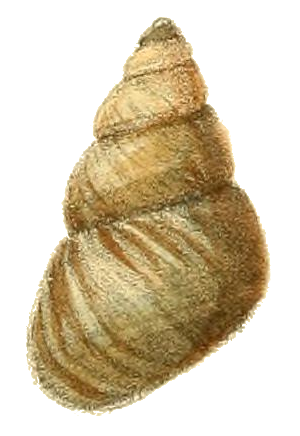
Drawing from the type description, abapertural view.

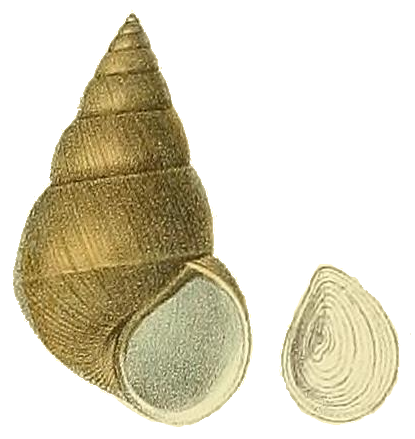
Drawing of an apertural view with operculum.

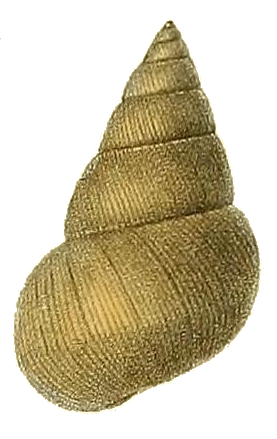
Drawing of an abapertural view of a shell.

== Ecology ==
=== Feeding habits ===
Sinotaia quadrata feeds on epiphytic algae.

Sinotaia quadrata histrica snails predate also on eggs of bluegill Lepomis macrochirus.

S. quadrata is a herbivorous deposit feeder. It consumes mainly epiphytic algae, but its diet also includes detritus, bacteria, aquatic plants, sand grains, diatoms, green algae, and cyanobacteria such as Microcystis. Its consumption of cyanobacteria during algal blooms may result in bioaccumulation of toxic microcystins (microcystin-LR, microcystin-RR) from Microcystis in the gonads, the hepatopancreas and the digestive tract. Adult snails feeding ad libitum under ideal laboratory conditions eat 16.0 mg of fish food daily.

=== Life cycle ===
Sinotaia quadrata has strong fecundity. It is gonochoristic, which means that each individual animal is distinctly male or female. The species is ovoviviparous. Newborn snails attach to non-sediment substrates (shells of adults or other material) in their first 2–3 days.

The shell length of juvenile snails starts at about 3 mm and grows rapidly by about 190 μm daily. Juveniles become adults at the age of nine weeks, when they reach a shell height of 12.15–16.09 mm (0.478–0.633 in) from then on, they grow more slowly at about 30 μm daily. Snails can be reliably sexed at this age.

Individuals start mating and reproducing in at water temperatures of 16–18 °C (61–64 °F), although a temperature of 24–26 °C (75–79 °F) is optimal. Females start to give birth to the first newborn snails at the age of 18 weeks, when they reach a shell height of 15–16 mm and a body weight of 0.81–0.94 g (0.029–0.033 oz). Gravidity of adult females lasts the entire year. The average number of newborn snails in the wild is 0.24 snails per day (50 per year) or up to 0.55 snails per day in the laboratory. Each gravid female carries 19–21 embryos inside her.

Generation time is quite short at about four months. The species can have three generations per year in the aquarium. The reproductive cycle is about six months.

=== Environmental sensitivity ===
S. quadrata has been the subject of various aquatic toxicology studies into the effects of copper, cadmium, lead, ethylbenzene, 2,2',4,4'- tetrabromodiphenyl ether, tributyltin, microcystin, multi-walled carbon nanotubes, and 17β-estradiol. The species has a high sensitivity to copper exposure and could thus be used for monitoring of sediment toxicity caused by environmental copper pollution.

Sinotaia quadrata snails from West Lake in Hanoi, Vietnam were found to be contaminated with copper, lead and zinc. The concentration of these elements in these snails exceeded standards of Food and Drug Administration and of Food Standards Australia New Zealand.

Distribution of rare-earth elements was studied in a labolatory. Results shown bioaccumulation of lanthanum, samarium, gadolinium and yttrium in Sinotaia quadrata and there was found no bioaccumulation of cerium in this snail.

=== Conservation ===
The species' population trend is unknown, but population sizes are mostly large. Water pollution and sedimentation are threats to local populations, while more general threats include habitat fragmentation by damming and habitat destruction. The genetic diversity of this species was found to be high in China. S. quadrata is currently classified as Least Concern by the IUCN.

=== Parasites and predators ===
Parasites of Sinotaia quadrata include trematode Aspidogaster conchicola.

S. quadrata serves as an intermediate host for Angiostrongylus cantonensis and for Echinochasmus fujianensis.

Predators of the species include the black carp Mylopharyngodon piceus; S. quadrata is one of the main food sources for this fish, making it important in the freshwater food chain.

== Human use ==
Sinotaia quadrata
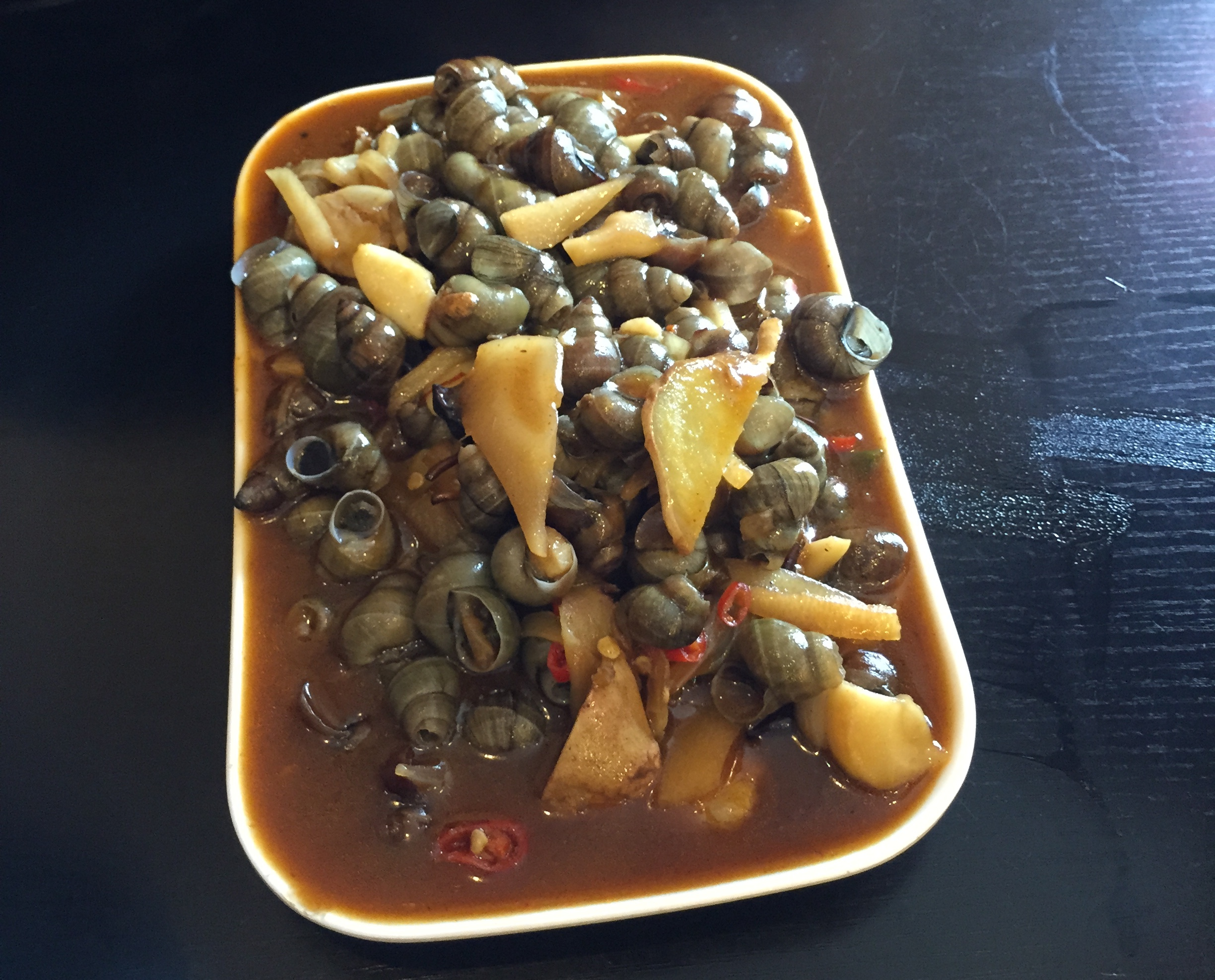
- Chinese food from Guangxi with Sinotaia quadrata.

Nutritional value per 100 g (3.5 oz)
- Carbohydrates: 2.07 g
- Protein
Amino acids
Threonine	3.416 g
Isoleucine	2.447 g
Leucine	5.910 g
Lysine	4.201 g
Methionine	1.293 g
Cystine	1.477 g
Phenylalanine	2.401 g
Tyrosine	3.232 g
Valine	2.262 g
Arginine	5.171 g
Histidine	1.339 g
Alanine	3.970 g
Aspartic acid	7.387 g
Glutamic acid	11.588 g
Glycine	3.878 g
Proline	2.170 g
Serine	3.186 g
- Other constituents: Quantity
- Water: 78.34 g
- Crude fat: 0.78 g
- Crude protein: 14.43 g
- Crude ash: 4.38 g
- ^{†}Percentages estimated using US recommendations for adults.

Sinotaia quadrata is common animal food used in aquaculture to feed fish black carp in China.

This species is also eaten by humans. In Isan, Thailand they are collected by hand or with a handnet from canals, swamps, ponds and flooded rice paddy fields during the rainy season. During the dry season, snails live under dried mud. Collectors use a spade to scrape the ground to find and catch them. Generally they are collected by both men and women. The snails are then cleaned and cooked in a curry. They are also parboiled in salted water and eat together with green papaya salad. S. quadrata is commonly sold in markets and restaurants in China and constitutes one of the three predominant freshwater snails found in Chinese markets, where it is considered a delicacy. The species is also used as feed in crab culture as well as fish, poultry and livestock raising. The annual production of S. quadrata in Chao Lake in 2002 amounted to 28 084 t. Although harvesting pressure in China is high, the high genetic diversity suggests that the species is currently not negatively affected by it.
