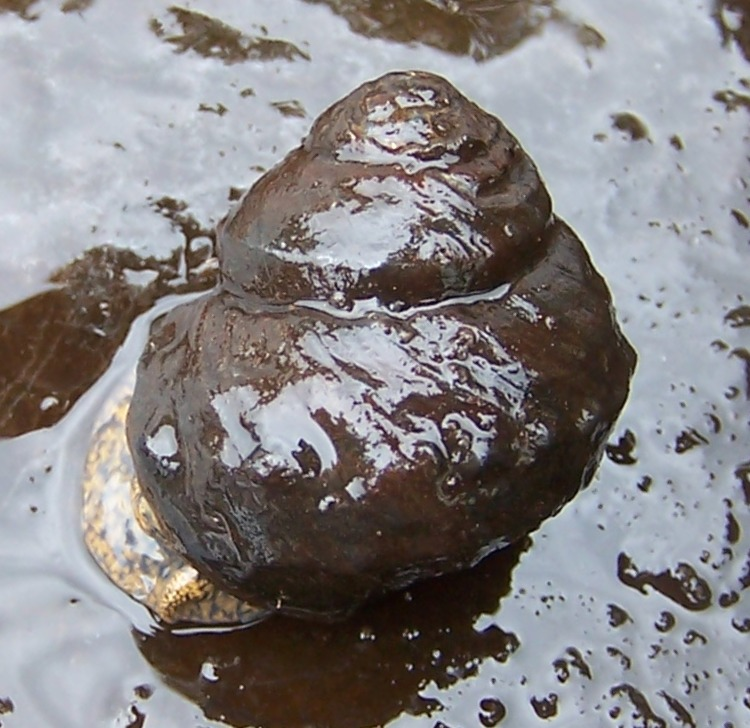
- A live Tulotoma magnifica on a mud substrate

Conservation status
- Endangered (IUCN 2.3)

- Imperiled (NatureServe)

Scientific classification
- Kingdom: Animalia
- Phylum: Mollusca
- Class: Gastropoda
- Subclass: Caenogastropoda
- Order: Architaenioglossa
- Family: Viviparidae
- Genus: Tulotoma; Haldeman, 1840
- Species: T. magnifica

Binomial name
- Tulotoma magnifica (Conrad, 1834)

Synonyms
- Paludina magnifica Conrad, 1834

= Tulotoma =

Genus of gastropods

Tulotoma magnifica, common name the Alabama live-bearing snail or tulotoma, is an endangered species of large freshwater snail, an aquatic gastropod mollusk in the family Viviparidae.

== Taxonomy ==
Tulotoma is a monotypic genus, in other words, this is the only species in the genus.

== Distribution ==
This species is endemic to the Coosa River-Alabama River system in Alabama, United States.

== Description ==
The shell of this species is large, solid, thick and imperforate. The shape of the shell is obtusely conic. The spire is elevated. The whorls are flattened, nodulous and carinated. The peristome is thin and continuous. The shell can grow fairly large, to more than 25 mm (0.98 in) in height. The operculum is concentric, subtriangular, with the inner margin reflected and forming an elevated marginal fold.

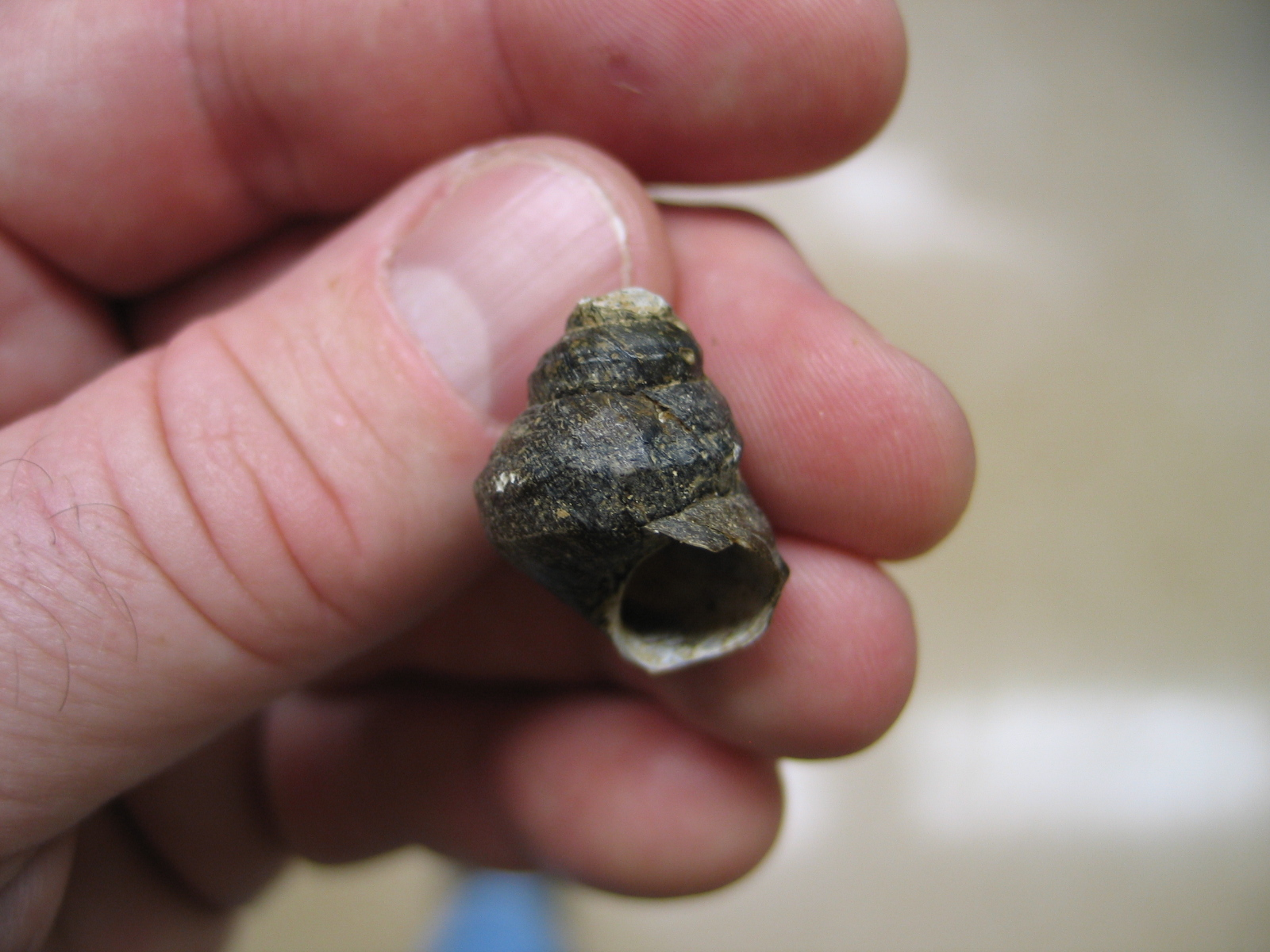
Apertural view of a small empty shell

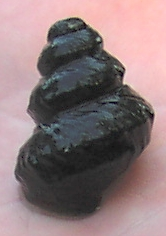
Abapertural view of another individual

It is a species with a moderate foot, not produced beyond the snout. The snout is small. The radula is multicuspid.

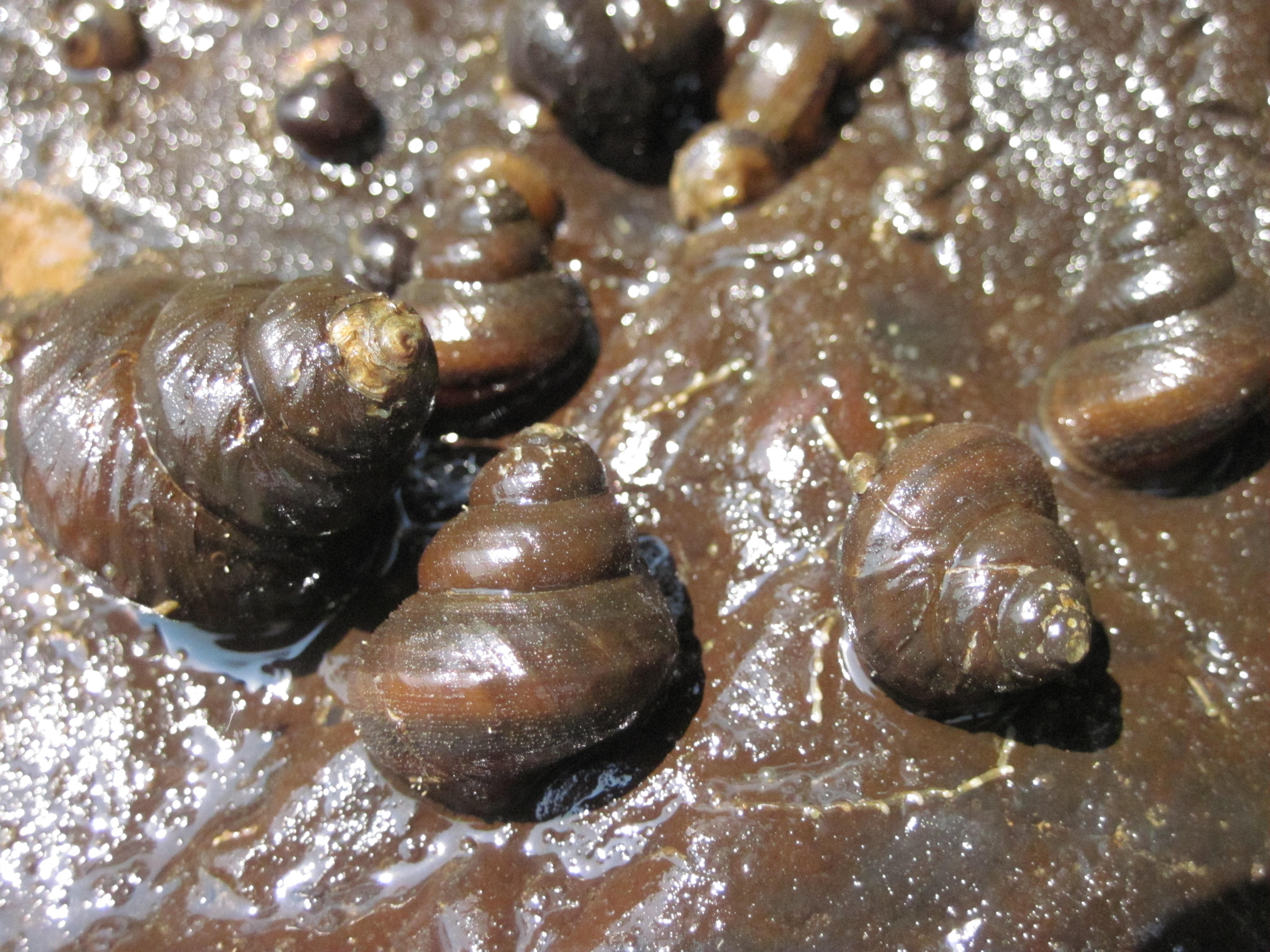
A group of Tulotoma magnifica on mud

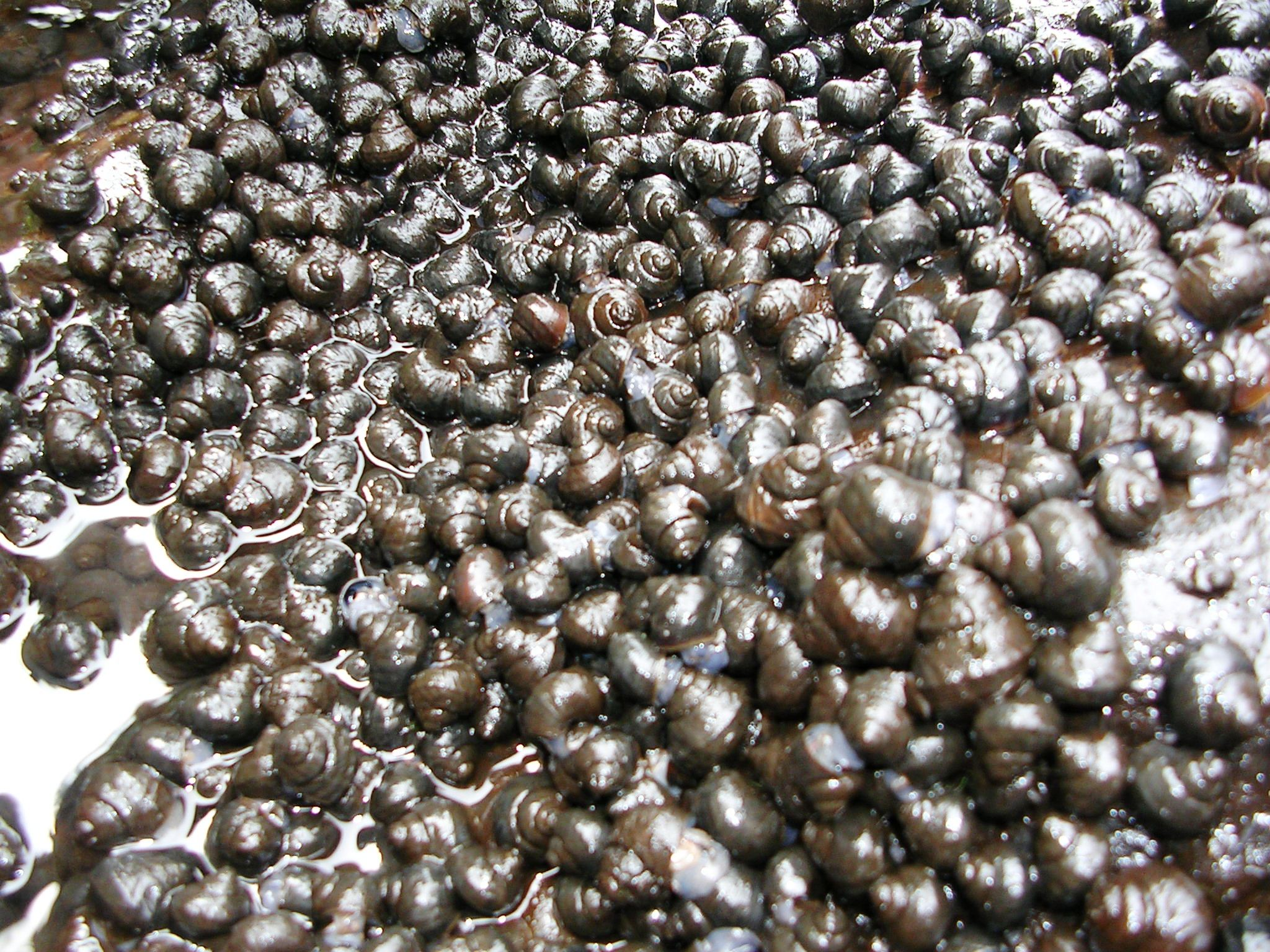
A large number of Tulotoma magnifica on mud
