= Margarya laeta =

Scientific classification
- Kingdom: Animalia
- Phylum: Mollusca
- Class: Gastropoda
- Subclass: Caenogastropoda
- Order: Architaenioglossa
- Family: Viviparidae
- Genus: Margarya
- Species: M. laeta

Binomial name
- Margarya laeta (E. von Martens, 1861)

Synonyms
- Paludina laeta E. von Martens, 1861; Paludina japonica; Paludina malleata Reeve, 1863; Vivipara stelmaphora; Vivipara lecythoides; Viviparus malleatus Reeve, 1863

Species of gastropod

Margarya laeta is a species of large, freshwater snail with an operculum and a gill, an aquatic gastropod mollusk in the family Viviparidae, the river snails.

== Description ==
The shell is described as thin and "egg-shaped" with very rounded whorls. The spire is short, and the apex may become worn out in older specimens. The name malleatus derives from Latin malleāre (to hammer) and refers to the "hammered-like sculpture" often found on the shell of this species.
