= Rivularia (gastropod) =

Scientific classification
- Domain: Eukaryota
- Kingdom: Animalia
- Phylum: Mollusca
- Class: Gastropoda
- Subclass: Caenogastropoda
- Order: Architaenioglossa
- Family: Viviparidae
- Subfamily: Viviparinae
- Genus: Rivularia; Heude, 1890
- Species: R. auriculata

Binomial name
- Rivularia auriculata (E. von Martens, 1875)

Synonyms
- Paludina (Melantho) auriculata E. von Martens, 1875; Paludina auriculata E. von Martens, 1875; Rivularia auricularis Heude, 1890; Rivularia elongata Heude, 1890

Genus of freshwater snails

Rivularia is a monotypic genus of freshwater snails with a gill and an operculum, aquatic gastropod mollusks in the family Viviparidae. Species in this genus is distributed only along the Xiang River region of Hunan province, People's Republic of China.

== Taxonomy ==
This genus was originally placed under the subfamily Bellamyinae of Viviparidae. In 2017, it was moved to Viviparinae based on anatomical and genetic data.

== Species ==
As of May 2024, WoRMS only recognize one species in this genus, namely Rivularia auriculata (E. von Martens, 1875), the type species of this genus. The original combination is this species was Paludina auriculata Martens, 1875.

A number of species inquirenda have been assigned to this genus, but none have so far been accepted:

- Rivularia bicarinata
- Rivularia calcarata
- Rivularia glandina Heude, 1890
- Rivularia globosa Heude, 1890
- Rivularia ovum Heude, 1890
- Rivularia subelliptica Heude, 1890

== Description ==
Rivularia auriculata grows to about 25 mm (1 in). The shell is thick and has about 4.5 whorls. The shape is oval to subglobose. It is usually smooth and olive-yellow in colour, typically without bands.
