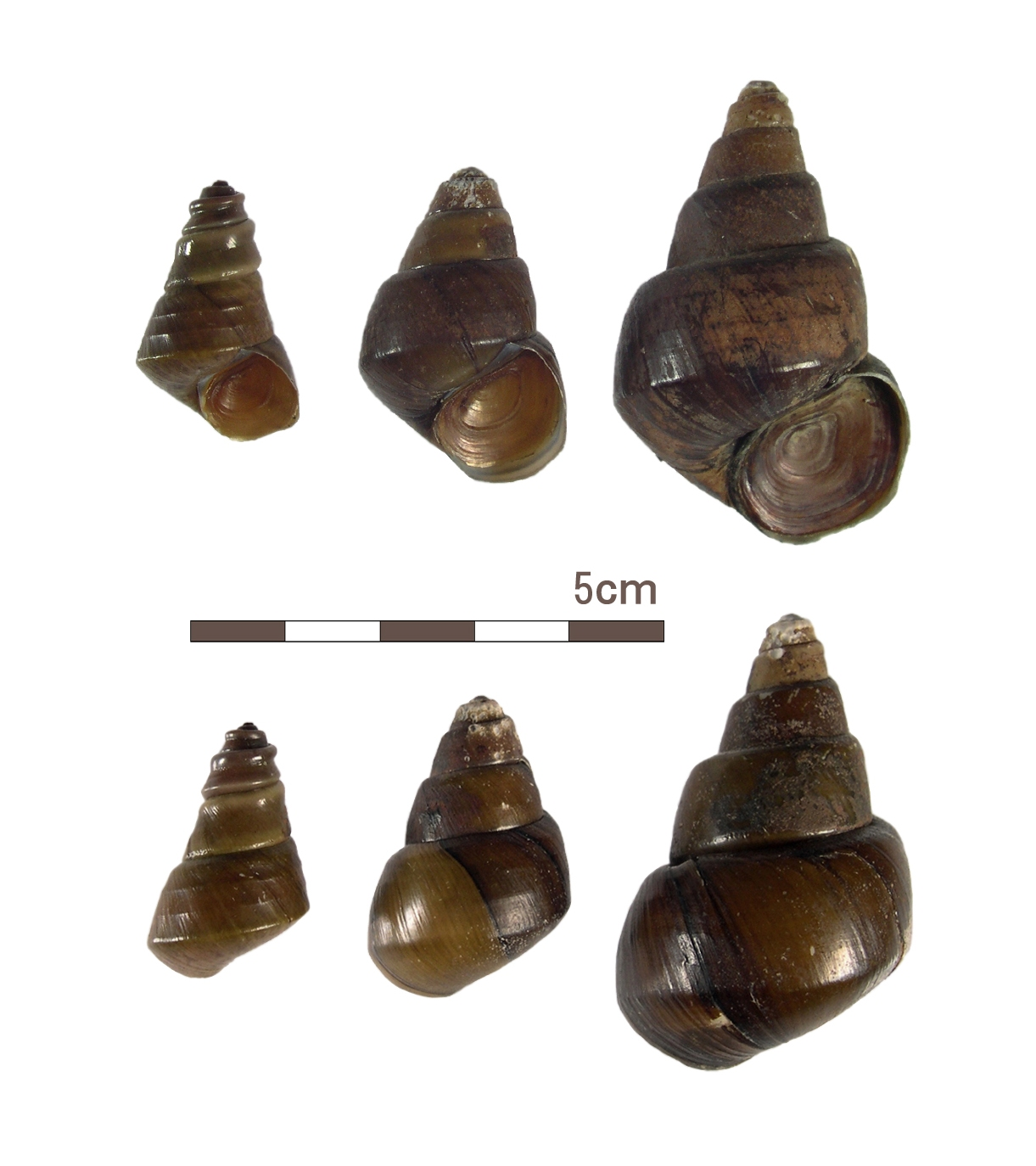
- shells of Heterogen longispira

Scientific classification
- Kingdom: Animalia
- Phylum: Mollusca
- Class: Gastropoda
- Subclass: Caenogastropoda
- Order: Architaenioglossa
- Family: Viviparidae
- Genus: Heterogen; Annandale, 1921
- Species: H. longispira

Binomial name
- Heterogen longispira (E. A. Smith, 1886)

= Heterogen =

Heterogen longispira

Species of gastropod

Heterogen longispira is a species of operculate freshwater snail, aquatic gastropod mollusks in the family Viviparidae.

Heterogen longispira is the only species in the genus Heterogen.

== Distribution ==
Heterogen longispira is endemic to Lake Biwa, Japan.
