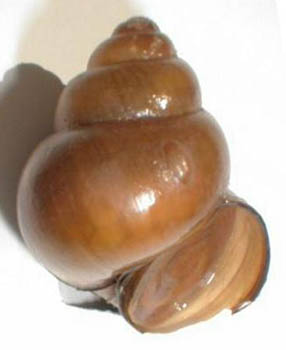
- A shell of Cipangopaludina chinensis

Scientific classification
- Kingdom: Animalia
- Phylum: Mollusca
- Class: Gastropoda
- Subclass: Caenogastropoda
- Order: Architaenioglossa
- Superfamily: Viviparoidea; Gray, 1847

= Viviparoidea =

Superfamily of gastropods

Viviparoidea is a taxonomic superfamily of freshwater snails, aquatic gastropod mollusks within the informal group Architaenioglossa, which belongs to the clade Caenogastropoda.

The following two families have been recognized in the taxonomy of Bouchet & Rocroi (2005):

- Family Viviparidae
- † Family Pliopholygidae
