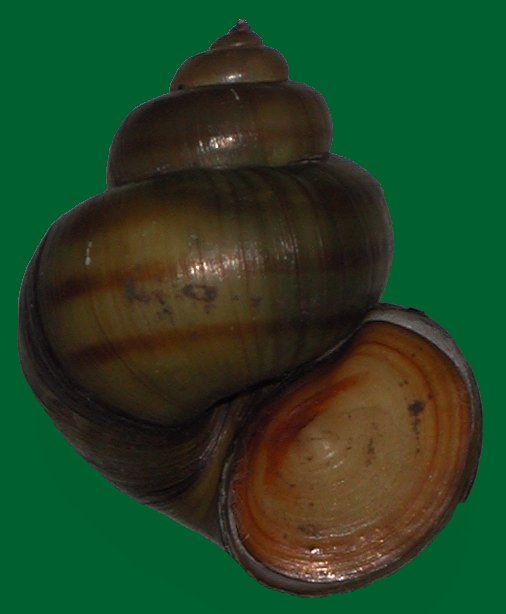
- An alive but retracted individual of Viviparus contectus, showing the operculum

Scientific classification
- Kingdom: Animalia
- Phylum: Mollusca
- Class: Gastropoda
- Subclass: Caenogastropoda
- Order: Architaenioglossa
- Superfamily: Viviparoidea
- Family: Viviparidae; J. E. Gray, 1847

Diversity
- 125–150 freshwater species

= Viviparidae =

Viviparidae Temporal range: Middle Jurassic–Recent

Family of gastropods

Viviparidae, commonly called river snails, are a family of freshwater snails with gills and a protective lid (operculum). Their family tree is complex, and genetic evidence suggesting some species in this family don't fit neatly into traditional groups. These snails are native to lakes and rivers across Europe, Asia, and parts of North America. Some, like Cipangopaludina japonica, have become invasive thanks to their ability to adapt.

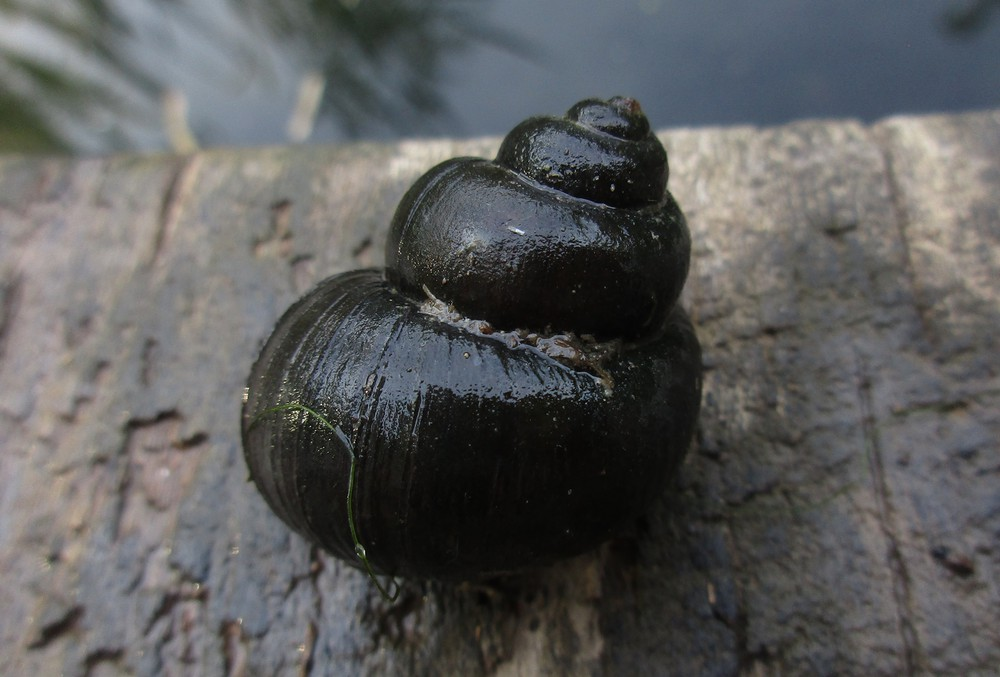
Intact image of Viviparus contectus from Netherlands

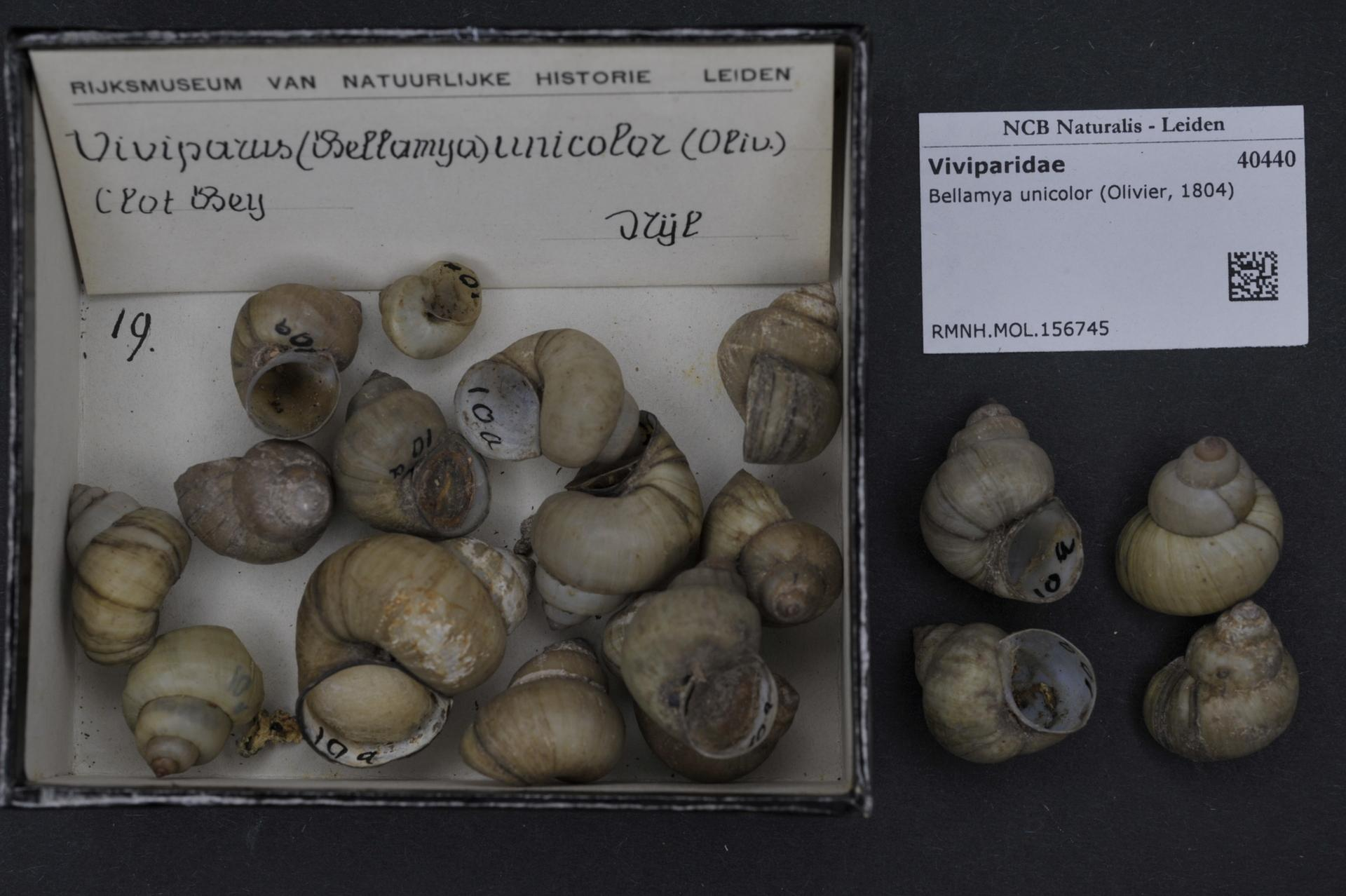
Empty shells of Bellamya unicolor

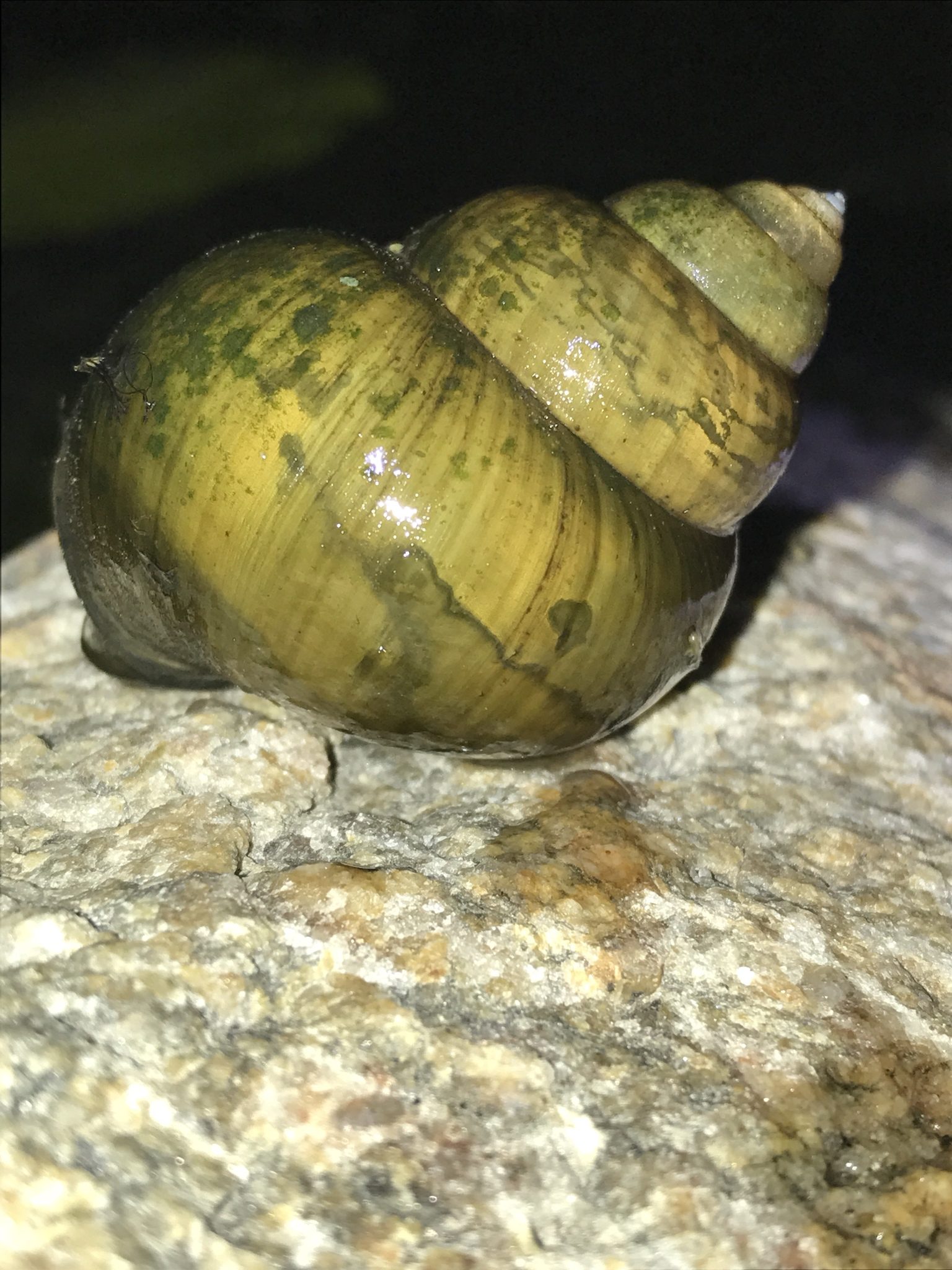
Viviparidae image

== Distribution ==
This family occurs nearly worldwide in temperate and tropical regions, other than South America.

There are two genera of Viviparidae in Africa: Bellamya and Neothauma.

The oldest known vivparid is Viviparus langtonensis from the Middle Jurassic of England. The oldest records from the Southern Hemisphere is from the Late Jurassic Talbragar fossil beds of Australia.

Viviparidae snails are native to freshwater spots like rivers and lakes across Europe, Asia, and parts of North America, and they've spread out widely in places like Russia and China. Cipangopaludina japonica has become invasive in North America.

== Taxonomy and phylogeny ==
The family Viviparidae contains 3 subfamilies (according to the taxonomy of the Gastropoda by Bouchet & Rocroi, 2005):

- Viviparinae Gray, 1847 (1833) - synonyms: Paludinidae Fitzinger, 1833 (inv.); Kosoviinae Atanackovic, 1859 (n.a.)
- Bellamyinae Rohrbach, 1937 - synonym: Amuropaludinidae Starobogatov, Prozorova, Bogatov & Sayenko, 2004 (n.a.)
- Lioplacinae Gill, 1863 - synonym: Campelomatinae Thiele, 1929

Scientists used to group Viviparidae snails based on how they look, but with the advent of DNA research, a more complex tree has developed. Species such as Viviparus chui, Cipangopaludina chinensis, Sinotaia quadrata histrica have been reclassified based on this new data. The way the various species are related is still being studied.

== Morphology and evolution ==
Viviparidae shells seem to develop characteristics based on environmental factors such a water conditions. Cipangopaludina japonica in particular are very adaptable These snails can live anywhere from 3 to 11 years, depending on their environment.

== Genera ==
Genera within the family Viviparidae (listed beneath their subfamilies) include:

- Viviparinae Gray, 1847
  - Type Genus: Viviparus Montfort, 1810
  - Galizgia Mikhaylovskiy, 1903
  - † Kosovia Atanacković, 1959
  - Rivularia Heude, 1890
  - Trochopaludina Starobogatov, 1985
  - Tulotoma Haldeman, 1840
- Bellamyinae Rohrbach, 1937
  - Type Genus: Bellamya Jousseame, 1886
  - Amuropaludina Moskvicheva, 1979
  - Angulyagra Rao, 1931
  - Anulotaia Brandt, 1968
  - Anularya Zhang & Chen, 2015
  - † Apameaus Sivan, Heller & van Damme, 2006
  - Boganmargarya Thach, 2018
  - Celetaia Clench 1966
  - Cipangopaludina Hannibal, 1912
  - Eyriesia P. Fischer, 1885
  - Filopaludina Habe, 1964
  - Heterogen Annandale, 1921
  - Idiopoma Pilsbry, 1901
  - Larina Adams, 1851
  - Margarya Nevill, 1877
  - Mekongia Crosse & Fischer, 1876
  - Neclarina Iredale, 1943
  - Neothauma E. A. Smith, 1880
  - Notopala Cotton, 1935
  - Sinotaia Haas, 1939
  - Taia Annandale, 1918
  - † Temnotaia Annandale, 1919
  - Tchangmargarya He, 2013
  - Torotaia Haas, 1939
  - Trochotaia Brandt, 1974
- Lioplacinae Gill, 1863
  - Campeloma Rafinesque, 1819
  - Lioplax Troschel, 1856
- subfamily?
  - † Albianopalin Hamilton-Bruce, Smith & Gowlett-Holmes, 2002
  - Siamopaludina Brandt, 1968

=== Genera brought into synonymy ===
- Centrapala Cotton, 1935: synonym of Larina A. Adams, 1855
- Contectiana Bourguignat, 1880: synonym of Viviparus Montfort, 1810
- Eularina Iredale, 1943: synonym of Larina A. Adams, 1855
- subfamily † Kosoviinae Atanacković, 1959: synonym of Viviparidae Gray, 1847
- Lecythoconcha Annandale, 1920: synonym of Cipangopaludina Hannibal, 1912
- Metohia Popović, 1964 : (junior homonym, no replacement name available in 2014)
- Notopalena Iredale, 1943: synonym of Notopala Cotton, 1935
- Paludina Férussac, 1812: synonym of Viviparus Montfort, 1810
- Siamopaludina Brandt, 1968 : synonym of Filopaludina (Siamopaludina) Brandt, 1968 represented as Filopaludina Habe, 1964
- Vivipara : synonym of Viviparus Montfort, 1810

== Lifecycle ==
Viviparidare are viviparous: they give birth to live offspring instead of laying eggs. Internal fertilization occurs, and the embryos develop within the female's brood pouch. Once mature, the offspring are released into the water as miniature versions of the adults. This method has shown to increase their chances of survival in freshwater environments. Life spans have been reported from 3 to 11 years in various species of Viviparidae, depending on environmental conditions and species type.

== Fossil record ==
Fossil records of Viviparus langtonensis show they've lived in freshwater for millions of years.
