= List of Conus species =

This list of Conus species is a listing of species in the genus Conus, a genus of sea snails, specifically cone snails, marine gastropod mollusks in the family Conidae.

For many years, all of the cone snails were placed in the genus Conus. More recently a large number of species have been moved to other genera.

This list with over 1,000 accepted species relies on the taxonomy used in the World Register of Marine Species and the publication in 2015 by Puillandre N., Duda T.F., Meyer C., Olivera B.M. & Bouchet P. (2015). One, four or 100 genera? A new classification of the cone snails. Journal of Molluscan Studies. 81: 1-23

== Species ==
Species within the genus Conus:

=== A ===
- Conus abbas Hwass in Bruguière, 1792
- Conus abbreviatus Reeve, 1843
- Conus abrolhosensis Petuch, 1987
- † Conus abruptus Marshall, 1918
- † Conus academicus Dall & Ochsner, 1928
- Conus achatinus Gmelin, 1791
- † Conus acrotholoides Tate, 1890
- Conus acutangulus Lamarck, 1810
- Conus adami Wils, 1988
- Conus adamsonii Broderip, 1836
- Conus admirationis Poppe & Tagaro, 2015
- † Conus adversarius Conrad, 1840
- Conus advertex (Garrard, 1961)
- † Conus adversarius Conrad 1840
- † Conus aemulator A. P. Brown & Pilsbry, 1911
- Conus aemulus Reeve, 1844
- Conus aequiquadratus Monnier, Tenorio, Bouchet & Puillandre, 2018
- Conus africanus Kiener, 1845
- Conus aito Rabiller & Richard, 2014
- Conus alabaster Reeve, 1849
- Conus alainallaryi Bozzetti & Monnier, 2009
- Conus albellus Röckel & Korn, 1990
- Conus albuquerquei Trovão, 1978
- Conus alconnelli da Motta, 1986
- Conus alexandrei (Limpalaër & Monnier, 2012)
- Conus alexandrinus Kaicher, 1977
- Conus alexisallaryi (Cossignani, 2018)
- Conus alfi (Thach, 2016)
- Conus algoensis G. B. Sowerby I, 1834
- Conus aliwalensis (S. G. Veldsman, 2018)
- Conus allaryi Bozzetti, 2008
- Conus alrobini (Thach, 2016)
- Conus amadis Gmelin, 1791
- Conus ambiguus Reeve, 1844
- Conus ammiralis Linnaeus, 1758
- Conus amoni (Lorenz, 2023)
- Conus amphiurgus Dall, 1889
- Conus amplus Röckel & Korn, 1992
- Conus anabathrum Crosse, 1865
- Conus anabelae Rolán & Röckel, 2001
- Conus andamanensis E. A. Smith, 1879
- † Conus andreei Kittl, 1887
- Conus andremenezi Olivera & Biggs, 2010
- Conus anemone Lamarck, 1810
- Conus angasi Tryon, 1884
- Conus angeluquei (Tenorio, Abalde & Zardoya, 2018)
- Conus angioiorum Röckel & Moolenbeek, 1992
- Conus annegretae Schönherr, 2018
- † Conus anningae Hendricks, 2015
- † Conus antiquus Lamarck, 1810
- Conus antoniaensis (Cossignani & Fiadeiro, 2014)
- Conus antonioi (Cossignani, 2014)
- Conus antoniomonteiroi Rolán, 1990
- Conus aplustre Reeve, 1843
- † Conus aquensis A. d'Orbigny, 1852
- Conus arafurensis (Monnier, Limpalaër & Robin, 2013)
- Conus araneosus sensu Lightfoot, 1786
- Conus arangoi Sarasúa, 1977
- Conus aratispira Pilsbry, 1905
- Conus archiepiscopus Hwass in Bruguière, 1792
- Conus archon Broderip, 1833
- Conus ardisiaceus Kiener, 1845
- Conus arenatus Hwass in Bruguière, 1792
- † Conus argillicola Eichwald, 1830
- Conus ariejoostei (S. G. Veldsman, 2016)
- Conus aristophanes G. B. Sowerby II, 1857
- Conus armadillo Shikama, 1971
- † Conus armentrouti Hickman, 1980
- † Conus armoricus Suter, 1917
- † Conus arnztenii K. Martin, 1916
- Conus arthuri (M. A. Lima & T. Cossignani, 2023)
- Conus artoptus G. B. Sowerby I, 1833
- † Conus asheri Petuch, 1988
- Conus asiaticus da Motta, 1985
- † Conus asterousiaensis Psarras, Koskeridou & Merle, 2021
- Conus ateralbus Kiener, 1845
- Conus athenae Filmer, 2011
- Conus atimovatae (Bozzetti, 2012)
- Conus attenuatus Reeve, 1844
- Conus augur sensu Lightfoot, 1786
- † Conus aulacophorus Cossmann, 1900
- Conus aulicus Linnaeus, 1758
- Conus aurantius Hwass in Bruguière, 1792
- Conus auratinus da Motta, 1982
- Conus aureonimbosus Petuch, 1987
- Conus aureopunctatus Petuch, 1987
- Conus aureus Hwass in Bruguière, 1792
- Conus auricomus Hwass in Bruguière, 1792
- Conus aurisiacus Linnaeus, 1758
- Conus australis (Holten, 1802)
- † Conus austriaconoe Sacco, 1893
- † Conus austriacus R. Hoernes & Auinger, 1879
- Conus austroviola Röckel & Korn, 1992
- Conus axelrodi Walls, 1978

=== B ===
- Conus babaensis Rolán & Röckel, 2001
- Conus bahamensis Vink & Röckel, 1995
- Conus baeri Röckel & Korn, 1992
- Conus bairstowi G. B. Sowerby III, 1889
- Conus balabacensis Filmer, 2012
- † Conus baldichieri Borson, 1820
- Conus balerensis Olivera, Saguil & Bouchet, 2019
- Conus balteatus G. B. Sowerby I, 1833
- Conus bandanus Hwass in Bruguière, 1792
- † Conus bantamensis Oostingh, 1938
- Conus baochauae Thach, 2020
- Conus barbara Brazier, 1898
- Conus barbieri G. Raybaudi Massilia, 1995
- Conus barrosensis (Cossignani & Fiadeiro, 2017)
- Conus barthelemyi Bernardi, 1861
- Conus bartschi G. D. Hanna & Strong, 1949
- † Conus basteroti Mayer-Eymar, 1891
- Conus basunii (T. Cossignani, 2022)
- Conus bayani Jousseaume, 1872
- Conus bayeri Petuch, 1987
- Conus beatrix Tenorio, Poppe, & Tagaro, 2007
- Conus behelokensis Lauer, 1989
- Conus belairensis Pin & Leung Tack in Pin, 1989
- Conus belizeanus (Petuch & Sargent, 2011)
- † Conus bellacoensis Hendricks, 2015
- † Conus bellissimus (Harzhauser & Landau, 2016)
- Conus bellocqae van Rossum, 1996
- Conus bellulus Rolán, 1990
- Conus bengalensis (Okutani, 1968)
- Conus berdulinus Veillard, 1972
- † Conus berghausi Michelotti, 1847
- Conus bessei Petuch, 1992
- † Conus betulinoides Lamarack, 1810
- Conus betulinus Linnaeus, 1758
- Conus beyerae (Poppe & Tagaro, 2023)
- Conus biancae Bozzetti, 2010
- Conus biliosus (Röding, 1798)
- Conus binghamae Petuch, 1987
- Conus blanfordianus Crosse, 1867
- Conus blatteus Shikama, 1979
- Conus boavistensis Rolán & Fernandez in Rolán, 1990
- Conus bocagei Trovão, 1978
- Conus bocki G. B. Sowerby III, 1881
- † Conus boeckhi Halaváts, 1884
- Conus boeticus Reeve, 1844
- Conus bondarevi Röckel & G. Raybaudi Massilia, 1992
- Conus bonfigliolii (Bozzetti, 2010)
- † Conus bonneti Cossmann, 1900
- Conus borgesi Trovão, 1979
- Conus boui da Motta, 1988
- Conus boutetorum Richard & Rabiller, 2013
- Conus brandonensis (Lorenz, 2019)
- Conus bratcherae (Petuch & Berschauer, 2019)
- † Conus breitenbergeri (Harzhauser & Landau, 2016)
- Conus brettinghami Coomans, Moolenbeek & Wils, 1982
- Conus brianhayesi Korn, 2002
- Conus brianoi (Cossignani & Allary, 2019)
- † Conus brocchii Bronn, 1828
- Conus broderipii Reeve, 1844
- † Conus bronnii Michelotti, 1847
- † Conus broteri Pereira da Costa, 1866
- Conus bruguieri Kiener, 1846
- Conus brunneobandatus Petuch, 1992
- Conus brunneofilaris Petuch, 1990
- Conus brunneus Wood, 1828
- Conus bruuni Powell, 1958
- Conus bulbus Reeve, 1843
- Conus bullatus Linnaeus, 1758
- Conus buniatus (Bozzetti, 2013)
- Conus burryae Clench, 1942
- † Conus busuegoi (Shuto, 1969)
- Conus buxeus (Röding, 1798)
- Conus byssinus (Röding, 1798)

=== C ===
- Conus cacao Ferrario, 1983
- † Conus cacellensis Pereira da Costa, 1866
- † Conus cadonensis Lyell & G. B. Sowerby II in Lyell, 1840
- Conus caillaudii Kiener, 1845
- Conus calhetae Rolan, 1990
- † Conus calvimontanus Deshayes, 1865
- Conus canariensis (Tenorio, Abalde, Pardos-Blas & Zardoya, 2020)
- Conus calhetinensis (Cossignani & Fiadeiro, 2014)
- Conus cancellatus Hwass in Bruguière, 1792
- Conus canonicus Hwass in Bruguière, 1792
- Conus cantamessae (S. J. Maxwell & Berschauer, 2023)
- Conus capitanellus Fulton, 1938
- Conus capitaneus Linnaeus, 1758
- Conus capreolus Röckel, 1985
- Conus caracteristicus Fischer von Waldheim, 1807
- Conus carcellesi Martins, 1945
- Conus cardinalis Hwass in Bruguière, 1792
- Conus cargilei Coltro, 2004
- Conus carioca Petuch, 1986
- † Conus carlottae Hendricks, 2015
- Conus carnalis G. B. Sowerby III, 1879
- † Conus cashi Hendricks, 2015
- Conus castaneus Kiener, 1848
- † Conus catenatus G. B. Sowerby I, 1850
- Conus cathyae (Monnier, Limpalaër & Prugnaud, 2020)
- Conus catus Hwass in Bruguière, 1792
- Conus caysalensis L. Raybaudi & Prati, 1994
- Conus cazalisoi (Cossignani & Fiadeiro, 2018)
- Conus cebuensis Wils, 1990
- Conus cedonulli Linnaeus, 1758
- Conus cepasi Trovão, 1975
- Conus ceruttii Cargile, 1997
- Conus cervus Lamarck, 1822
- Conus chaldaeus (Röding, 1798)
- † Conus charigi Ladd, 1982
- † Conus cheribonensis K. Martin, 1895
- Conus chiangi (Azuma, 1972)
- Conus chiapponorum Lorenz, 2004
- Conus chindeensis (Monnier, Prugnaud & Limpalaër, 2021)
- Conus chrisclarkeae (Lorenz, 2024)
- Conus chytreus Tryon, 1884
- Conus ciderryi da Motta, 1985
- Conus cinereus Hwass in Bruguière, 1792
- Conus cingulatus Lamarck, 1810
- Conus circumactus Iredale, 1929
- Conus circumcisus Born, 1778
- Conus clarus E. A. Smith, 1881
- Conus classiarius Hwass in Bruguière, 1792 (nomen dubium)
- † Conus clavatulus d'Orbigny, 1852
- Conus clerii Reeve, 1844
- † Conus climax Tomlin, 1937
- Conus cloveri Walls, 1978
- Conus cocceus Reeve, 1844
- Conus coccineus Gmelin, 1791
- Conus coelinae Crosse, 1858
- Conus coffeae Gmelin, 1791
- Conus coffeebayensis (S. G. Veldsman, 2023)
- Conus collisus Reeve, 1849
- Conus colmani Röckel & Korn, 1990
- Conus colombi (Monnier & Limpalaër, 2012)
- Conus colombianus Petuch, 1987
- Conus coltrorum (Petuch & R. F. Myers, 2014)
- Conus columbianus Petuch, 1987
- † Conus comatosaeformis Yokoyama, 1928
- † Conus complicatus Tate, 1890
- Conus compressus G. B. Sowerby II, 1866 Tentatively listed as a valid species
- Conus conco Puillandre, Stöcklin, Favreau, Bianchi, Perret, Rivasseau, Limpalaër, Monnier & Bouchet, 2015
- † Conus conicomaculatus Sacco, 1893
- † Conus conoponderosus Sacco, 1893
- Conus consors G. B. Sowerby I, 1833
- Conus conspersus Reeve, 1844
- † Conus convexus G. F. Harris, 1897
- Conus corallinus Kiener, 1845
- Conus corbieri Blöcher, 1994
- Conus cordigera G. B. Sowerby II, 1866
- Conus coronatus Gmelin, 1791
- † Conus cosmetulus Cossmann, 1900
- † Conus costellatus Grateloup, 1835
- † Conus cresnensis Morlet, 1885
- Conus crocatus Lamarck, 1810
- Conus crosnieri (Tenorio, Monnier & Puillandre, 2018)
- Conus crotchii Reeve, 1849
- Conus cumingii Reeve, 1848
- Conus cuna Petuch, 1998
- Conus cuneolus Reeve, 1843
- Conus curassaviensis Hwass in Bruguière, 1792
- Conus curralensis Rolán, 1986
- † Conus cuspidatus Tate, 1890
- Conus cuvieri Crosse, 1858
- Conus cyanostoma A. Adams, 1855
- Conus cylindraceus Broderip & G. B. Sowerby I, 1830
- Conus cymbioides Tenorio, Bouchet & Puillandre, 2018

=== D ===
- † Conus daciae R. Hoernes & Auinger, 1879
- Conus dalli Stearns, 1873
- † Conus damianakisi Psarras, Merle & Koskeridou, 2022
- Conus damottai Trovão, 1979
- Conus dampierensis Coomans & Filmer, 1985
- Conus dangdami Thach, 2017
- Conus danilai Röckel & Korn, 1990
- Conus daphne Boivin, 1864
- Conus darkini Röckel, Korn, & Richard, 1993
- Conus daucus Hwass in Bruguière, 1792
- Conus daullei Crosse, 1858
- † Conus davolii Psarras, Merle & Koskeridou, 2022
- Conus dayriti Röckel & da Motta, 1983
- † Conus decollatus K. Martin, 1884
- Conus decolrobertoi (Cossignani & Fiadeiro, 2017): synonym of Conus maioensis Trovão, Rolán & Félix-Alves, 1990
- Conus decoratus Röckel, Rolán & Monteiro, 1980
- † Conus decussatus Deshayes, 1823
- Conus dedonderi (Goethaels & D. Monsecour, 2013)
- Conus delanoyae Trovão, 1979
- † Conus dellabellai Pavia, 2022
- Conus denizi Afonso & Tenorio, 2011
- † Conus dennanti Tate, 1892
- † Conus deperditus Bruguière, 1792
- Conus deprinsi Thach, 2020
- Conus desiradensis Rabiller & Richard, 2019
- Conus desidiosus A. Adams, 1855
- Conus desiradensis Rabiller & Richard, 2019
- Conus devorsinei (Petuch, Berschauer & Poremski, 2015)
- Conus deynzerorum Petuch, 1995
- Conus diadema G. B. Sowerby I, 1834
- Conus diannae (T. Cossignani, Allary & P. G. Stimpson, 2022)
- Conus dianthus G. B. Sowerby III, 1882
- Conus diegoi (Cossignani, 2014)
- Conus diminutus Trovão & Rolán, 1986
- † Conus dingleanus Beets, 1984
- Conus dispar G. B. Sowerby I, 1833
- Conus distans Hwass in Bruguière, 1792
- † Conus djarianensis K. Martin, 1895
- Conus dominicanus Hwass in Bruguière, 1792
- Conus donnae Petuch, 1998
- Conus dorotheae Monnier & Limpalaër, 2010
- Conus dorreensis Péron, 1807
- Conus duffyi Petuch, 1992
- Conus ducphuongi Thach, 2017
- Conus dusaveli (H. Adams, 1872)

=== E ===
- Conus easoni (Petuch & Berschauer, 2018)
- Conus ebraeus Linnaeus, 1758
- Conus eburneus Hwass in Bruguière, 1792
- Conus echinophilus (Petuch, 1975)
- Conus echo Lauer, 1989
- Conus edaphus (Dall, 1910)
- Conus ednae (Petuch, 2013)
- Conus edwardpauli Petuch, 1998
- † Conus elatus Michelotti, 1847
- Conus eldredi Morrison, 1955
- Conus eleutheraensis (Petuch, 2013)
- Conus emaciatus Reeve, 1849
- Conus empressae Lorenz, 2001
- Conus encaustus Kiener, 1845
- † Conus epiensis Abrard, 1947
- Conus episcopatus da Motta, 1982
- Conus episcopus Hwass, 1792
- Conus epistomium Reeve, 1844
- Conus equiminaensis Schönherr, 2018
- † Conus erbi Haanstra & Spiker, 1932
- Conus ermineus Born, 1778
- Conus ernesti Petuch, 1990
- Conus ernestojavieri (Poppe & Tagaro, 2023)
- Conus erythraeensis Reeve, 1843
- † Conus eschewegi Pereira da Costa, 1866
- Conus escondidai Poppe & Tagaro, 2005
- Conus espingueirensis (Cossignani & Fiadeiro, 2017)
- Conus estellae Cossignani, 2020
- † Conus eszterhazyi K. Papp, 1897
- Conus estivali Röckel, Richard, & Moolenbeek, 1995
- Conus eusebioi Schönherr, 2018
- Conus evansi Bondarev, 2001
- Conus eversoni Petuch, 1987
- † Conus everwijni K. Martin, 1883
- Conus excelsus G. B. Sowerby III, 1908
- Conus exiguus Lamarck, 1810
- Conus eximius Reeve, 1849
- Conus explorator Vink, 1990
- † Conus extensus M. Hörnes, 1851

=== F ===
- Conus felitae Rolán, 1990
- Conus felix Fenzan, 2012
- † Conus fenestratus K. Martin, 1884
- † Conus fennemai Schepman, 1907
- Conus fergusoni G. B. Sowerby II, 1873
- Conus fernandesi Tenorio, Afonso & Rolán, 2008
- Conus ferrugineus Hwass in Bruguière, 1792
- Conus figulinus Linnaeus, 1758
- Conus fijisulcatus Moolenbeek, Röckel & Bouchet, 2008
- Conus filmeri Rolán & Röckel, 2000
- Conus fischoederi Röckel & da Motta, 1983
- Conus flamingo Petuch, 1980
- Conus flammeacolor Petuch, 1992
- Conus flavescens G. B. Sowerby I, 1834
- Conus flavidus Lamarck, 1810
- Conus flavus Röckel, 1985
- Conus flavusalbus Rolán & Röckel, 2000
- Conus floccatus G. B. Sowerby I, 1841
- Conus floridulus A. Adams & Reeve, 1848
- Conus fonsecai (Petuch & Berschauer, 2016)
- Conus fosteri Clench & Aguayo, 1942
- Conus fragilissimus Petuch, 1979
- Conus franciscanus Hwass in Bruguière, 1792
- Conus franciscoi Rolán & Röckel, 2000
- † Conus franklinae Hendricks, 201
- Conus fraserorum (Lorenz, 2020)
- Conus freitasi (Tenorio, Afonso, Rolán, Pires, Vasconcelos, Abalde & Zardoya, 2018)
- Conus frigidus Reeve, 1848
- † Conus fuerteventurensis Vera-Peláez & Martín-González, 2018
- Conus fulgetrum G. B. Sowerby I, 1834
- Conus fulmen Reeve, 1843
- Conus fumigatus Hwass in Bruguière, 1792
- Conus furnae Rolán, 1990
- † Conus furvoides Gabb, 1873
- Conus furvus Reeve, 1843
- Conus fuscatus Born, 1778
- † Conus fuscocingulatus M. Hörnes, 1851
- Conus fuscoflavus Röckel, Rolán, & Monteiro, 1980
- Conus fuscolineatus G. B. Sowerby III, 1905
- † Conus fusellinus Suter, 1917

=== G ===
- Conus gabelishi da Motta, 1982
- Conus galeao Rolán, 1990
- Conus galeyi Monnier, Tenorio, Bouchet & Puillandre, 2018
- † Conus gallicus Mayer-Eymar, 1891
- Conus garciai da Motta, 1982
- † Conus garrisoni Hendricks, 2015
- Conus garywilsoni Lorenz & Morrison, 2004
- † Conus gastaldii Michelotti, 1847
- Conus gauguini Richard & Salvat, 1973
- † Conus gembacanus K. Martin, 1884
- Conus generalis Linnaeus, 1767
- Conus genuanus Linnaeus, 1758
- Conus geographus Linnaeus, 1758
- † Conus gerthi Pannekoek, 1936
- Conus gibsonsmithorum Petuch, 1986
- Conus gigasulcatus Moolenbeek, Röckel & Bouchet, 2008
- Conus gilvus Reeve, 1849
- Conus giorossii Bozzetti, 2005
- † Conus girondicus Peyrot, 1931
- Conus gladiator Broderip, 1833
- Conus glans Hwass in Bruguière, 1792
- Conus glaucus Linnaeus, 1758
- Conus glenni Petuch, 1993
- Conus glicksteini Petuch, 1987
- † Conus globoponderosus (Sacco, 1893)
- Conus gloriakiiensis Kuroda & Itô, 1961
- Conus gloriamaris Chemnitz, 1777
- Conus glorioceanus Poppe & Tagaro, 2009
- Conus goajira Petuch, 1992
- Conus gondwanensis Röckel, Richard, & Moolenbeek, 1995
- Conus gonsalensis (Cossignani & Fiadeiro, 2014)
- Conus gonsaloi (Afonso & Tenorio, 2014)
- Conus goudeyi (Monnier & Limpalaër, 2012)
- † Conus gouldi Hendricks, 2015
- Conus gracianus da Motta & Blöcher, 1982
- † Conus gracilispira O. Boettger, 1875
- Conus gradatulus Weinkauff, 1875
- Conus gradatus (Wood, 1828)
- Conus grahami Röckel, Cosel & Burnay, 1980
- Conus granarius Kiener, 1847
- Conus grangeri G. B. Sowerby III, 1900
- Conus granulatus Linnaeus, 1758
- Conus granum Röckel & Fischöder, 1985
- Conus gratacapii Pilsbry, 1904
- Conus guanahacabibensis Espinosa & Ortea, 2016
- Conus guanche Lauer, 1993
- Conus guarapari (Crabos, Pomponet, Queiroz & L. Passos, 2022)
- Conus gubernator Hwass in Bruguière, 1792
- Conus guinaicus Hwass in Bruguière, 1792
- † Conus gulemani Erünal-Erentöz, 1958

=== H ===
- Conus habui Lan, 2002
- Conus hamamotoi Yoshiba & Koyama, 1984
- Conus hamanni Fainzilber & Mienis, 1986
- Conus hanshassi Lorenz & Barbier, 2012
- Conus harasewychi Petuch, 1987
- † Conus hardi K. Martin, 1879
- Conus harlandi Petuch, 1987
- Conus havanensis Aguayo & Farfante, 1947
- † Conus haytensis G. B. Sowerby I, 1850
- Conus hazinorum (Petuch & Myers, 2014)
- Conus helgae Blöcher, 1992
- † Conus helladicus Psarras, Koskeridou & Merle, 2021
- † Conus hendersoni Marwick, 1931
- † Conus hendricksi (Harzhauser & Landau, 2016)
- Conus hennequini Petuch, 1993
- † Conus herklotsi K. Martin, 1879
- Conus hervillardi (Monnier, Prugnaud & Limpalaër, 2022)
- † Conus heterospira Tate, 1890
- Conus hieroglyphus Duclos, 1833
- Conus hilli Petuch, 1990
- Conus hirasei (Kuroda, 1956)
- † Conus hirmetzli (Z. Kovács & Vicián, 2014)
- Conus hoaraui (Monnier & Limpalaër, 2015)
- † Conus hochstetteri K. Martin, 1879
- † Conus hoernesi Doderlein, 1864
- Conus honkeri Petuch, 1988
- Conus honkerorum (Petuch & R. F. Myers, 2014)
- Conus huberianus Thach, 2020
- Conus hughmorrisoni Lorenz & Puillandre, 2015
- † Conus hulshofi K. Martin, 1906
- † Conus humerosus Pilsbry, 1921
- † Conus hungaricus Hoernes & Auinger, 1879
- Conus hyaena Hwass in Bruguière, 1792
- † Conus hypermeces Cossmann, 1900

=== I ===
- † Conus ickei K. Martin, 1906
- † Conus ictini Psarras, Merle & Koskeridou, 2022
- Conus ignotus Cargile, 1998
- Conus immelmani Korn, 1998
- Conus imperialis Linnaeus, 1758
- Conus inaccomodus (Lorenz, 2024)
- Conus inconstans E. A. Smith, 1877
- † Conus indefatigabilis Dall & Ochsner, 1928
- Conus indomaris (Bozzetti, 2014)
- Conus inesae (Monteiro, Afonso, Tenorio, Rosado & Pirinhas, 2014)
- Conus infinitus Rolán, 1990
- Conus infrenatus Reeve, 1848
- Conus inscriptus Reeve, 1843
- Conus insulae (Tenorio, Abalde, Pardos-Blas & Zardoya, 2020)
- Conus insularis Gmelin, 1791
- Conus iodostoma Reeve, 1843
- Conus irwansyahi (T. Cossignani, 2024)
- Conus isabelarum Tenorio & Afonso, 2004

=== J ===
- Conus jacarusoi Petuch, 1998
- Conus janus Hwass in Bruguière, 1792
- † Conus javanus K. Martin, 1879
- † Conus jenkinsi K. Martin, 1879
- Conus jickelii Weinkauff, 1873
- † Conus jocus (Finlay, 1927)
- † Conus johannae R. Hoernes & Auinger, 1879
- Conus jonsingletoni H. Morrison, 2019
- Conus jorioi (Petuch, 2013)
- Conus josephinae Rolán (Mosquera), 1980
- Conus jourdani da Motta, 1984
- Conus jucundus G. B. Sowerby III, 1887
- Conus judaeus Bergh, 1895
- Conus julieandreae Cargile, 1995
- Conus julii Lienard, 1870
- † Conus junghuhni K. Martin, 1879

=== K ===
- † Conus kaesleri Hendricks, 2015
- † Conus kahiko Kohn, 1980
- Conus kaiserae Tenorio, Tucker & Chaney, 2012
- Conus kahlbrocki (Lorenz, 2019)
- Conus kalafuti da Motta, 1987
- † Conus karamanensis Erünal-Erentöz, 1958
- † Conus karikalensis Cossmann, 1900
- † Conus karlschmidti Maury, 1917
- Conus karubenthos Touitou, Puillandre, Bouchet & Clovel, 2020
- Conus kawamurai Habe, 1962
- Conus keatii G. B. Sowerby II, 1858
- † Conus kendrewi Petuch, 1997
- Conus kermadecensis Iredale, 1912
- Conus kersteni Tenorio, Afonso & Rolán, 2008
- Conus kerstitchi Walls, 1978
- Conus kevani Petuch, 1987
- Conus kiicumulus (Azuma, 1982)
- Conus kinoshitai (Kuroda, 1956)
- Conus kintoki Habe & Kosuge, 1970
- Conus kirkandersi Petuch, 1987
- Conus klemae (Cotton, 1953)
- Conus knudseni Sander, 1982
- Conus kolaceki (T. Cossignani, 2023)
- Conus kostini Filmer et al., 2012
- Conus koukae (Monnier, Limpalaër & Robin, 2013)
- † Conus kovacsi (Harzhauser & Landau, 2016)
- Conus kremerorum Petuch, 1988
- Conus kulkulcan Petuch, 1980
- Conus kuroharai (Habe, 1965)
- † Conus kutaiensis Beets, 1983
- Conus kwajaleinensis (Monnier, Prugnaud & Limpalaër, 2022)

=== L ===
- Conus lamberti Souverbie, 1877
- Conus lamyi Rabiller & Richard, 2019
- † Conus lapugyensis R. Hoernes & Auinger, 1879
- Conus largilliertii Kiener, 1847
- Conus lariniorum (Lorenz, 2020)
- Conus laterculatus G. B. Sowerby II, 1870
- Conus laueri (Monnier & Limpalaër, 2013)
- Conus laurenti Rabiller & Richard, 2019
- † Conus lauriatragei Psarras, Merle & Koskeridou, 2022
- Conus lecourtorum (Lorenz, 2011)
- Conus leehmani da Motta & Röckel, 1979
- Conus leekremeri Petuch, 1987
- Conus legatus Lamarck, 1810
- Conus lemniscatus Reeve, 1849
- Conus lenavati da Motta, 1982
- Conus leobottonii Lorenz, 2006
- Conus leobrerai da Motta & Martin, 1982
- Conus leopardus (Röding, 1798)
- † Conus letkesensis (Harzhauser & Landau, 2016)
- Conus levis (Bozzetti, 2012)
- Conus levistimpsoni (Tucker, 2013)
- Conus lienardi Bernardi & Crosse, 1861
- † Conus ligatus Tate, 1890
- Conus lightbourni Petuch, 1986
- Conus limpusi Röckel & Korn, 1990
- Conus lindae Petuch, 1987
- Conus lineoeburneus Bozzetti, 2023
- Conus lineopunctatus Kaicher, 1977
- Conus lischkeanus Weinkauff, 1875
- Conus litoglyphus Hwass in Bruguière, 1792
- Conus litteratus Linnaeus, 1758
- Conus lividus Hwass in Bruguière, 1792
- Conus lizardensis Crosse, 1865
- Conus lobitensis Kaicher, 1977
- Conus locumtenens Blumenbach, 1791
- Conus lohri Kilburn, 1972
- † Conus lombardii Hendricks, 2015
- Conus longilineus Röckel, Rolán & Monteiro, 1980
- † Conus loochooensis MacNeil, 1961
- † Conus loomisi Dall & Ochsner, 1928
- Conus loriae (T. Cossignani, Allary & P. G. Stimpson, 2022)
- Conus loroisii Kiener, 1846
- † Conus losariensis K. Martin, 1895
- Conus lozeti Richard, 1980
- Conus lucaya Petuch, 2000
- Conus luciae Moolenbeek, 1986
- † Conus lugubris Reeve, 1849
- Conus luizcoutoi (Crabos, Pomponet, Queiroz & L. Passos, 2022)
- Conus lulii (M. A. Lima & T. Cossignani, 2023)
- Conus luteus G. B. Sowerby I, 1833
- † Conus lyelli Hendricks, 2015
- Conus lynceus G. B. Sowerby II, 1858

=== M ===
- † Conus maaboensis Icke & K. Martin, 1907
- Conus maculiferus G. B. Sowerby I, 1833
- Conus madagascariensis G. B. Sowerby II, 1858
- Conus madecassinus (Bozzetti, 2012)
- † Conus maduranus Tomlin, 1937
- Conus magellanicus Hwass in Bruguière, 1792
- Conus magnificus Reeve, 1843
- † Conus magnolapugyensis Sacco, 1893
- Conus magnottei Petuch, 1987
- Conus magus Linnaeus, 1758
- Conus maioensis Trovão, Rolán & Félix-Alves, 1990
- Conus malabaricus (Monnier, Limpalaër & Tenorio, 2017)
- Conus malacanus Hwass in Bruguière, 1792
- Conus malcolmi (Monnier & Limpalaër, 2015)
- Conus maldivus Hwass in Bruguière, 1792
- Conus manusensis (Monnier, Prugnaud & Limpalaër, 2022)
- Conus mappa sensu Lightfoot, 1786
- Conus marchionatus Hinds, 1843
- Conus mariaodeteae (Petuch & Myers, 2014)
- Conus marielae Rehder & Wilson, 1975
- † Conus marii Sacco, 1893
- Conus marileeae (Harasewych, 2014)
- Conus marimaris (Tenorio, Abalde & Zardoya, 2018)
- Conus maritzaallaryi (T. Cossignani & Allary, 2023)
- Conus markpagei (R. Aiken, 2021)
- Conus marmoreus Linnaeus, 1758
- Conus martensi E. A. Smith, 1884
- † Conus martini Wanner & Hahn, 1935
- Conus martinianus Reeve, 1844
- Conus mascarenensis (Monnier & Limpalaër, 2019)
- Conus massemini (Monnier & Limpalaër, 2016)
- † Conus mauryi Finlay, 1927
- Conus maya (Petuch & Sargent, 2011)
- Conus mcbridei Lorenz, 2005
- Conus medoci Lorenz, 2004
- Conus medvedevi (Monteiro, Afonso, Tenorio, Rosado & Pirinhas, 2014)
- Conus melvilli G. B. Sowerby III, 1879
- † Conus menkrawitensis Beets, 1941
- † Conus mercati Brocchi, 1814
- Conus mercator Linnaeus,1758
- Conus merletti Mayissian, 1974
- Conus metcalfii Reeve, 1843
- † Conus miamiensis Petuch, 1986
- Conus michelcharlesi (Monnier, Limpalaër & Prugnaud, 2020)
- Conus micropunctatus Rolán & Röckel, 2000
- Conus miles Linnaeus, 1758
- Conus milesi E. A. Smith, 1887
- Conus miliaris Hwass in Bruguière, 1792
- Conus milneedwardsi Jousseaume, 1894
- Conus minamiae (Lum, 2023)
- Conus miniexcelsus Olivera & Biggs, 2010
- Conus minnamurra (Garrard, 1961)
- † Conus miovoeslauensis Sacco, 1893
- Conus miruchae Röckel, Rolán & Monteiro, 1980
- Conus mitratus Hwass in Bruguière, 1792
- † Conus moissettei Psarras, Merle & Koskeridou, 2022
- † Conus mojsvari R. Hoernes & Auinger, 1879
- † Conus molis A. P. Brown & Pilsbry, 1911
- Conus moluccensis Küster, 1838
- Conus monachus Linnaeus, 1758
- Conus moncuri Filmer, 2005
- Conus monicae (Petuch & Berschauer, 2015)
- Conus monile Hwass in Bruguière, 1792
- Conus monilifer Broderip, 1833
- Conus montillai Röckel, 1985
- Conus moolenbeeki Filmer, 2011
- † Conus moravicus Hoernes & Auinger, 1879
- Conus moreleti Crosse, 1858
- Conus morrisoni G. Raybaudi Massilia, 1991
- Conus mosterti (R. Aiken, 2021)
- Conus moylani Delsaerdt, 2000
- Conus mozambicus Hwass in Bruguière, 1792
- Conus mpenjatiensis (S. G. Veldsman, 2016)
- † Conus mucronatolaevis Sacco, 1893
- Conus mucronatus Reeve, 1843
- Conus mulderi Fulton, 1936
- † Conus multiliratus Böse, 1906
- Conus muriculatus G. B. Sowerby I, 1833
- † Conus murravianus Tate, 1890
- Conus mus Hwass in Bruguière, 1792
- Conus musicus Hwass in Bruguière, 1792
- Conus mustelinus Hwass in Bruguière, 1792

=== N ===
- Conus nahoonensis (S. G. Veldsman, 2016)
- Conus namocanus Hwass in Bruguière, 1792
- Conus nanshaensis F.-L. Li, 2016
- Conus nanus G.B. Sowerby I & G.B. Sowerby I, 1833
- Conus naranjus Trovão, 1975
- Conus natalaurantius (S. G. Veldsman, 2013)
- Conus natalis G. B. Sowerby II, 1858
- Conus navarroi Rolán, 1986
- Conus negroides Kaicher, 1977
- Conus nemo (S. G. Veldsman, 2022)
- Conus neocostatus B. M. Olivera, Watkins, Puillandre & M. Tenorio, 2021
- Conus neptunus Reeve, 1843
- † Conus neugeboreni R. Hoernes & Auinger, 1879
- † Conus neumayri R. Hoernes & Auinger, 1879
- † Conus newtoni G. F. Harris, 1897
- Conus ngai Thach, 2020
- Conus ngaorum Thach, 2021
- † Conus ngavianus K. Martin, 1895
- Conus ngocngai Thach, 2017
- † Conus niasensis H. Woodward, 1879
- Conus niasensis (Monnier, Prugnaud & Limpalaër, 2022) (homonym)
- Conus nicopuillandrei Rabiller & Richard, 2019
- Conus niederhoeferi Monnier, Limpalaër & Lorenz, 1912
- Conus nielsenae Marsh, 1962
- Conus nigricolor Bozzetti, 2023
- Conus nigromaculatus Röckel & Moolenbeek, 1992
- Conus nigropunctatus G. B. Sowerby II, 1858
- Conus nimbosus Hwass in Bruguière, 1792
- Conus nobilis Linnaeus, 1758
- Conus nobrei Trovão, 1975
- † Conus nocens Garvie, 1996
- Conus nocturnus sensu Lightfoot, 1786
- Conus nodulosus G. B. Sowerby II, 1864
- Conus norai da Motta & G. Raybaudi Massilia, 1992
- Conus norpothi Lorenz, 2015
- Conus nosybarrenensis (Monnier, Limpalaër & Prugnaud, 2024)
- Conus nucleus Reeve, 1848
- Conus nunesi Schönherr, 2018
- Conus nussatella Linnaeus, 1758
- Conus nux Broderip, 1833
- Conus nybakkeni Tenorio, Tucker & Chaney, 2012

=== O ===
- † Conus oblongoturbinatus Grateloup, 1845
- † Conus oboesus Michelotti, 1847
- Conus obscurus G. B. Sowerby I, 1833
- Conus ochroleucus Gmelin, 1791
- † Conus odengensis K. Martin, 1895
- † Conus oinouyei Yokoyama, 1928
- Conus oishii (Shikama, 1977)
- † Conus oligistus Tomlin, 1937
- † Conus olivaeformis R. Hoernes & Auinger, 1879
- † Conus olssoni Maury, 1917
- Conus omaria Hwass in Bruguière, 1792
- Conus orion Broderip, 1833
- † Conus ornatissimus K. Martin, 1883
- Conus ortneri Petuch, 1998
- Conus ostrinus (Tucker & Tenorio, 2011)
- † Conus ottiliae R. Hoernes & Auinger, 1879
- Conus oualeiriensis Rabiller & Richard, 2019
- † Conus ozennii Crosse, 1858

=== P ===
- Conus padarosae (T. Cossignani & Fiadeiro, 2018)
- † Conus palabuanensis K. Martin, 1895
- † Conus pamotanensis K. Martin, 1906
- Conus papilliferus G. B. Sowerby I, 1834
- Conus papuensis Coomans & Moolenbeek, 1982
- Conus paraguana Petuch, 1987
- Conus paramagnificus (R. Aiken, 2023)
- † Conus paranobilis Petuch, 1991
- Conus parascalaris Petuch, 1987
- † Conus paratethyianus (Harzhauser & Landau, 2016)
- Conus parius Reeve, 1844
- Conus patmartii (Massemin & Balleton, 2024)
- Conus parvatus Walls, 1979
- Conus paschalli Petuch, 1998
- Conus patae Abbott, 1971
- Conus patamakanthini Delsaerdt, 1998
- Conus patglicksteinae Petuch, 1987
- Conus patmartii (Massemin & Balleton, 2024)
- Conus patriceae (Petuch & R. F. Myers, 2014)
- Conus patricius Hinds, 1843
- Conus paukstisi Tucker, Tenorio & Chaney, 2011
- Conus paulae Petuch, 1988
- Conus paulkersteni Thach, 2017
- Conus paumotu Rabiller & Richard, 2014
- Conus pauperculus G. B. Sowerby I, 1834
- Conus pavillardae Cossignani, 2019
- Conus peasei (Brazier, 1877)
- † Conus pelagicus Brocchi 1814
- Conus peli Moolenbeek, 1996
- Conus pellisserpentis Lorenz & K. Monsecour, 2023
- Conus penchaszadehi Petuch, 1986
- Conus pennaceus Born, 1778
- Conus pergrandis (Iredale, 1937)
- Conus perrineae (Cossignani & Fiadeiro, 2018)
- Conus pertusus Hwass in Bruguière, 1792
- † Conus pervindobonensis Sacco, 1893
- † Conus pestensis (Harzhauser & Landau, 2016)
- † Conus petasus Ludbrook, 1978
- † Conus petergabrieli Lorenz, 2006
- Conus peterstimpsoni (T. Cossignani & Allary, 2021)
- Conus peterstimpsoni (T. Cossignani & Allary, 2021) (accepted > unreplaced junior homonym)
- Conus petestimpsoni (Petuch & Berschauer, 2016)
- † Conus petrolei K. Martin, 1933
- Conus petuchi (Monteiro, Afonso, Tenorio, Rosado & Pirinhas, 2014)
- Conus philippii Kiener, 1845
- Conus philquiquandoni Cossignani, 2020
- Conus pica A. Adams & Reeve, 1848
- Conus pictus Reeve, 1843
- Conus piti Rabiller & Richard, 2019
- † Conus plagiarius K. Martin, 1935
- † Conus planiliratus G. B. Sowerby I, 1850
- Conus planorbis Born, 1778
- † Conus platensis Frenguelli, 1946
- Conus plinthis Richard & Moolenbeek, 1988
- Conus polongimarumai Kosuge, 1980
- Conus pomareae (Monnier & Limpalaër, 2014)
- † Conus ponderoaustriacus Sacco, 1893
- † Conus ponderosus Brocchi, 1814
- † Conus ponderovagus Sacco, 1893
- Conus pongo Coomans, Moolenbeek & Wils, 1982
- Conus poormani Berry, 1968
- Conus poremskigrandis (Crabos, Pomponet, Queiroz & L. Passos, 2023)
- Conus portobeloensis Petuch, 1990
- † Conus posticestriatus Kojumdgieva, 1960
- Conus potiguar (Petuch & Berschauer, 2019)
- Conus poulosi Petuch, 1993
- Conus praecellens A. Adams, 1855
- Conus praelatus Hwass in Bruguière, 1792
- † Conus praelongus R. Hoernes & Auinger, 1879
- † Conus precancellatus MacNeil, 1961
- Conus pretiosus Nevill & Nevill, 1874
- Conus primus Röckel & Korn, 1990
- Conus princeps Linnaeus, 1758
- † Conus priscus K. Martin, 1931
- Conus proximus G. B. Sowerby II, 1859
- Conus pseudaurantius Vink & Cosel, 1985
- Conus pseudimperialis Moolenbeek, Zandbergen, & Bouchet, 2008
- † Conus pseudoarmoricus P. Marshall & R. Murdoch, 1920
- Conus pseudocardinalis Coltro, 2004
- Conus pseudocedonulli Blainville, 1818
- † Conus pseudohungaricus (Harzhauser & Landau, 2016)
- Conus pseudomusicus Bozzetti, 2023
- Conus pseudonivifer Monteiro, Tenorio & Poppe, 2004
- † Conus pseudoponderosus Glibert, 1952
- † Conus pseudotextile Grateloup, 1835
- † Conus ptychodermis Tate, 1890
- Conus pulcher [Lightfoot], 1786
- Conus pulicarius Hwass in Bruguière, 1792
- Conus purissimus Filmer, 2011
- Conus purpurascens G. B. Sowerby I, 1833
- Conus purus Pease, 1863
- Conus purvisi (Cossignani & Fiadeiro, 2017)

=== Q ===
- Conus quasidaucus Touitou, Puillandre, Bouchet & Clovel, 2020
- Conus quasimagus (Bozzetti, 2016)
- Conus queenslandis da Motta, 1984
- † Conus querciniformis K. Martin, 1884
- Conus quercinus Lightfoot, 1786
- Conus quiquandoni Lorenz & Barbier, 2008

=== R ===
- Conus radiatus Gmelin, 1791
- † Conus ralphii Tenison Woods, 1879
- Conus ranonganus da Motta, 1978
- Conus rattus Hwass in Bruguière, 1792
- Conus raulsilvai Rolán, Monteiro & Fernandes, 1998
- Conus rawaiensis da Motta, 1978
- Conus recluzianus Bernardi, 1853
- † Conus recognitus Guppy, 1867
- Conus recurvus (Broderip, 1833)
- Conus reductaspiralis Walls, 1979
- Conus regius Gmelin, 1791
- Conus regonae Rolán & Trovão in Rolán, 1990
- Conus regularis G. B. Sowerby I, 1833
- † Conus rembangensis K. Martin, 1906
- Conus renateae Cailliez, 1993
- Conus renkeri (Poppe & Tagaro, 2023)
- Conus reticulatus Born, 1778
- Conus retifer Menke, 1829
- Conus richardbinghami Petuch, 1993
- Conus richardsae Röckel & Korn, 1992
- Conus richeri Richard & Moolenbeek, 1988
- Conus riosi Petuch, 1986
- Conus ritae Petuch, 1995
- Conus rizali Olivera & Biggs, 2010
- Conus robini (Limpalaër & Monnier, 2012)
- Conus roeckeli Rolán (Mosquera), 1980
- Conus rokokorum (Monnier, Prugnaud & Limpalaër, 2021)
- Conus rolani Röckel, 1986
- Conus rosalindensis Petuch, 1998
- Conus rosapex (Crabos, Pomponet, Queiroz & L. Passos, 2023)
- Conus rosemaryae Petuch, 1990
- Conus roseorapum G. Raybaudi & da Motta, 1990
- Conus rosi (Petuch & Berschauer, 2015)
- Conus rosiae (Monnier, Batifoix & Limpalaër, 2018)
- † Conus rotundus R. Hoernes & Auinger, 1879
- Conus rouxi (Monnier, Limpalaër & Robin, 2013)
- Conus royaikeni (S. G. Veldsman, 2010)
- Conus rufimaculosus Macpherson, 1959
- Conus ruthae (Monnier & Limpalaër, 2013)

=== S ===
- Conus sahlbergi da Motta & Harland, 1986
- Conus sakalava (Monnier & Tenorio, 2017)
- Conus salletae (Cossignani, 2014)
- Conus salzmanni G. Raybaudi-Massilia & Rolán, 1997
- Conus samadiae M. Tenorio & Puillandre, 2023
- Conus samaraiensis (Monnier, Prugnaud & Limpalaër, 2022)
- Conus samiae da Motta, 1982
- Conus sandwichensis Walls, 1978
- Conus sanguineus Kiener, 1850
- Conus sanguinolentus Quoy & Gaimard, 1834
- † Conus sannio Finlay, 1927
- Conus santaluziensis (Cossignani & Fiadeiro, 2015)
- Conus santanaensis (Afonso & Tenorio, 2014)
- Conus santinii (Monnier & Limpalaër, 2014)
- Conus saragasae Rolán, 1986
- Conus sartii Korn, Niederhöfer & Blöcher, 2002
- † Conus saucatsensis Mayer-Eymar, 1890
- Conus sazanka Shikama, 1970
- Conus scabriusculus Dillwyn, 1817
- Conus scalaris Valenciennes, 1832
- Conus scalarispira (Bozzetti, 2012)
- Conus scalarissimus da Motta, 1988
- v Conus scaliae Böse, 1906
- Conus scalii (T. Cossignani, 2023)
- Conus scalptus Reeve, 1843
- † Conus schroeckingeri R. Hoernes & Auinger, 1879
- Conus scopulorum Van Mol, Tursch & Kempf, 1971
- Conus scottjordani (Poppe, Monnier & Tagaro, 2012)
- Conus sculletti Marsh, 1962
- Conus sculpturatus Röckel & da Motta, 1986
- † Conus sedanensis K. Martin, 1906
- Conus sennottorum Rehder & Abbott, 1951
- Conus sertacinctus Röckel, 1986
- Conus severinae T. Cossignani, 2020
- † Conus sewalli Maury, 1917
- Conus shaskyi Tenorio, Tucker & Chaney, 2012
- Conus shikamai Coomans, Moolenbeek & Wils, 1985
- † Conus shimajiriensis MacNeil, 1961
- † Conus sieboldianus Makiyama, 1927
- † Conus simoensis K. Martin, 1906
- Conus simonis Bozzetti, 2010
- Conus sinaiensis (Petuch & Berschauer, 2016)
- † Conus sindangbaranensis K. Martin, 1906
- Conus skinneri da Motta, 1982
- Conus skoglundae Tenorio, Tucker & Chaney, 2012
- Conus smoesi (Petuch & Berschauer, 2016)
- † Conus socialis K. Martin, 1895
- Conus sogodensis (Poppe, Monnier & Tagaro, 2012)
- Conus solangeae Bozzetti, 2004
- Conus solidus Gmelin, 1791
- Conus solomonensis Delsaerdt, 1992
- Conus spectrum Linnaeus, 1758
- Conus sphacelatus G. B. Sowerby I, 1833
- Conus spiceri Bartsch & Rehder, 1943
- Conus splendidulus G. B. Sowerby I, 1833
- † Conus spolongensis K. Martin, 1916
- Conus sponsalis Hwass in Bruguière, 1792
- Conus spurius Gmelin, 1791
- Conus stanfieldi Petuch, 1998
- † Conus steinabrunnensis Sacco, 1893
- † Conus steindachneri R. Hoernes, 1879
- Conus stercusmuscarum Linnaeus, 1758
- Conus stimpsoni Dall, 1902
- Conus stramineus Lamarck, 1810
- Conus straturatus G. B. Sowerby II, 1865
- † Conus strauszi (Z. Kovács & Vicián, 2023)
- Conus striatellus Link, 1807
- † Conus striatellus H. M. Jenkins, 1864 (accepted > unreplaced junior homonym)
- Conus striatus Linnaeus, 1758
- Conus striolatus Kiener, 1845
- Conus stupa (Kuroda, 1956)
- † Conus sturi R. Hoernes & Auinger, 1879
- Conus stupella (Kuroda, 1956)
- † Conus subachatinus Crosse, 1858
- † Conus subalsionus A. d'Orbigny, 1852
- † Conus subbrevis d'Archiac & Haime, 1854
- Conus subfloridus da Motta, 1985
- † Conus subraristriatus Pereira da Costa, 1866
- † Conus subtessellatus d'Orbigny, 1852
- Conus suduirauti Raybaudi Massilia, 2004
- † Conus suessi R. Hoernes & Auinger, 1879
- Conus sugillatus Reeve, 1844
- Conus sugimotonis Kuroda, 1928
- Conus sukhadwalai Röckel & da Motta, 1983
- Conus sulcatus Hwass in Bruguière, 1792
- Conus sulcocastaneus Kosuge, 1981
- † Conus sumatrae Tomlin, 1937
- Conus sumbawaensis (Verbinnen, 2022)
- † Conus sundaicus Pannekoek, 1936
- Conus sunderlandi Petuch, 1987
- † Conus supracompressus Sacco, 1893
- Conus suratensis Hwass in Bruguière, 1792
- Conus sutanorcum Moolenbeek, Röckel & Bouchet, 2008
- Conus suturatus Reeve, 1844
- Conus swainsoni Estival & Cosel, 1986
- Conus sydneyensis G. B. Sowerby III, 1887
- † Conus symmetricus G. B. Sowerby I, 1850

=== T ===
- Conus tabidus Reeve, 1844
- Conus tacomae Boyer & Pelorce, 2009
- Conus taeniatus Hwass in Bruguière, 1792
- Conus tagaroae (Limpalaër & Monnier, 2013)
- Conus taitensis Hwass in Bruguière, 1792
- Conus takahashii (Petuch & Berschauer, 2019)
- Conus taphrus Woodring, 1970
- † Conus taurinensis Bellardi & Michelotti, 1840
- Conus telatus Reeve, 1848
- Conus tenorioi (Monnier, Monteiro & Limpalaër, 2016)
- Conus tenuilineatus Rolán & Röckel, 2001
- Conus tenuistriatus G. B. Sowerby II, 1858
- Conus terebra Born, 1778
- Conus terryni Tenorio & Poppe, 2004
- Conus tessulatus Born, 1778
- Conus tethys (Petuch & Sargent, 2011)
- Conus textile Linnaeus, 1758
- Conus thachi F. Huber, 2020
- Conus thalassiarchus G. B. Sowerby I, 1834
- Conus theodorei Petuch, 2000
- Conus therriaulti (Petuch, 2013)
- Conus thevenardensis da Motta, 1987
- Conus thomae Gmelin, 1791
- † Conus thorae Finlay, 1927
- Conus tiaratus G. B. Sowerby I, 1833
- † Conus tiarophorus Tomlin, 1937
- † Conus tietzei R. Hoernes & Auinger, 1879
- Conus timorensis Hwass in Bruguière, 1792
- Conus tinianus Hwass in Bruguière, 1792
- Conus tisii Lan, 1978
- † Conus tjaringinensis K. Martin, 1895
- † Conus tjidamarensis K. Martin, 1879
- † Conus tjilonganensis K. Martin, 1906
- † Conus tokunagai Otuka, 1934
- Conus tonisii (Petuch & Myers, 2014)
- Conus tostesi Petuch, 1986
- Conus totoi (M. A. Lima & T. Cossignani, 2023)
- Conus tourosensis (Petuch & Berschauer, 2018)
- Conus transkeiensis Korn, 1998
- † Conus transsylvanicus R. Hoernes & Auinger, 1879
- Conus trencarti Nolf & Verstraeten, 2008
- Conus tribblei Walls, 1977
- † Conus trigonicus Tomlin, 1937
- † Conus trigonulus Grateloup, 1835
- Conus trigonus Reeve, 1848
- Conus trinitarius Hwass in Bruguière, 1792
- Conus tristensis Petuch, 1987
- Conus trochulus Reeve, 1844
- Conus troendlei Moolenbeek, Zandbergen & Bouchet, 2008
- Conus trovaoi Rolán & Röckel, 2000
- Conus tulipa Linnaeus, 1758
- Conus tuticorinensis Röckel & Korn, 1990
- Conus typhon Kilburn, 1975

=== U ===
- Conus uhlei (Petuch, Coltro & Berschauer, 2020)
- Conus unifasciatus Kiener, 1845
- Conus urashimanus Kuroda & Itô, 1961

=== V ===
- Conus vanvilstereni (Moolenbeek & Zandbergen, 2013)
- Conus vappereaui Monteiro, 2009
- Conus variegatus Kiener, 1845
- Conus varius Linnaeus, 1758
- Conus vautieri Kiener, 1847
- Conus vayssierei Pallary, 1906
- Conus vegaluzi (Monnier, Prugnaud, Limpalaër, 2020)
- Conus velaensis Petuch, 1993
- Conus velliesi (S. G. Veldsman, 2016)
- Conus venezuelanus Petuch, 1987
- Conus ventricosus Gmelin, 1791
- Conus venulatus Hwass in Bruguière, 1792
- Conus verdensis Trovão, 1979
- Conus vexillum Gmelin, 1791
- Conus vezoi Korn, Niederhöfer & Blöcher, 2000
- Conus vezzarochristophei Cossignani, 2018
- Conus vezzaroi (Cossignani, 2016)
- Conus vezzaronellyae (Cossignani, 2018)
- Conus victoriae Reeve, 1843
- Conus vicweei Old, 1973
- Conus vidua Reeve, 1843
- Conus villepinii Fischer & Bernardi, 1857
- Conus viola Cernohorsky, 1977
- Conus violaceus Gmelin, 1791
- Conus virgatus Reeve, 1849
- Conus virgo Linnaeus, 1758
- Conus visagenus Kilburn, 1974
- Conus vittatus Hwass in Bruguière, 1792
- Conus vitulinus Hwass in Bruguière, 1792
- Conus voluminalis Reeve, 1843
- Conus vulcanus Tenorio & Afonso, 2004

=== W ===
- Conus wallangra (Garrard, 1961)
- Conus wandae (Cossignani, 2014)
- Conus wilsi Delsaerdt, 1998
- Conus wittigi Walls, 1977
- † Conus woodringi Hendricks, 2018

=== X ===
- Conus xanthicus Dall, 1910
- Conus xanthocinctus Petuch, 1986
- † Conus xenicus Pilsbry & Johnson, 1917
- Conus xhosa (S. G. Veldsman, 2016)
- Conus xicoi Röckel, 1987

=== Y ===
- Conus yemenensis Bondarev, 1997

=== Z ===
- † Conus zambaensis Hendricks, 2015
- Conus zandbergeni Filmer & Moolenbeek, 2010
- Conus zapatosensis Röckel, 1987
- Conus zebra Lamarck, 1810
- Conus zebroides Kiener, 1845
- Conus zeylanicus Gmelin, 1791
- Conus ziczac Mühlfeld, 1816
- Conus zonatus Hwass in Bruguière, 1792
- Conus zylmanae Petuch, 1998

== Species brought into synonymy ==
List of synonyms

This list is incomplete.

- Conus aculeiformis Reeve, 1844: synonym of Conasprella aculeiformis (Reeve, 1844)
- Conus acuminatus Hwass in Bruguière, 1792: synonym of Conus locumtenens Blumenbach, 1791
- Conus acutimarginatus G. B. Sowerby II, 1866: synonym of Conasprella jaspidea (Gmelin, 1791)
- Conus acutus G. B. Sowerby II, 1857: synonym of Conus musicus Hwass in Bruguière, 1792
- Conus adansoni sensu G. B. Sowerby II, 1858: synonym of Conus magus Linnaeus, 1758
- Conus adansonii Lamarck, 1810: synonym of Conus ventricosus Gmelin, 1791
- Conus adenensis E. A. Smith, 1891: synonym of Conus inscriptus Reeve, 1843
- Conus adonis Shikama, 1971: synonym of Conasprella memiae (Habe & Kosuge, 1970)
- Conus adriaticus Nardo, 1847: synonym of Conus ventricosus Gmelin, 1791
- Conus adustus G. B. Sowerby II, 1858: synonym of Conus erythraeensis Reeve, 1843
- Conus aegrotus Reeve, 1849: synonym of Conus furvus Reeve, 1843
- Conus affinis Gmelin, 1791: synonym of Conus circumcisus Born, 1778
- Conus agassizii Dall, 1886: synonym of Conasprella mindana (Hwass in Bruguière, 1792)
- Conus agrestis Mörch, 1850: synonym of Conus buxeus loroisii Kiener, 1846
- Conus akabensis G. B. Sowerby III, 1887: synonym of Conus quercinus [Lightfoot], 1786
- Conus albicans G. B. Sowerby II, 1857: synonym of Conus furvus Reeve, 1843
- Conus albomaculatus G. B. Sowerby II, 1841: synonym of Conus litoglyphus Hwass in Bruguière, 1792
- Conus albospira E. A. Smith, 1880: synonym of Conus straturatus G. B. Sowerby II, 1865
- Conus albus G. B. Sowerby III, 1887: synonym of Conus furvus Reeve, 1843
- Conus alexandremonteiroi (Cossignani, 2014): synonym of Conasprella alexandremonteiroi (Cossignani, 2014)
- Conus alfredensis Bartsch, 1915: synonym of Conus tinianus Hwass in Bruguière, 1792
- Conus alisi Röckel, Richard, & Moolenbeek, 1995: synonym of Conasprella alisi (Röckel, Richard, & Moolenbeek, 1995)
- Conus allamandi (Petuch, 2013): synonym of Conasprella allamandi (Petuch, 2013)
- Conus alternatus Link, 1807: synonym of Conus eburneus Hwass in Bruguière, 1792
- Conus altispiratus G. B. Sowerby II, 1873: synonym of Conus mozambicus Hwass in Bruguière, 1792
- Conus alveolus G. B. Sowerby I, 1833: synonym of Conus stramineus Lamarck, 1810
- Conus amabilis Lamarck, 1810: synonym of Conus pertusus Hwass in Bruguière, 1792
- Conus amazonicus Nardo, 1847: synonym of Conus ventricosus Gmelin, 1791
- Conus ambaroides Shikama, 1977: synonym of Conus magus Linnaeus, 1758
- Conus amethystinus Trovão, 1975: synonym of Conus carnalis G. B. Sowerby III, 1879
- Conus amiralis Hwass in Bruguière, 1792: synonym of Conus cedonulli Linnaeus, 1767
- Conus anadema Tomlin, 1937: synonym of Conus splendidulus G. B. Sowerby I, 1833
- Conus anaglypticus Crosse, 1865: synonym of Conasprella anaglyptica (Crosse, 1865)
- Conus anceps A. Adams, 1855: synonym of Conus consors G. B. Sowerby I, 1833
- Conus andrangae Schwengel, 1955: synonym of Conus bartschi G. D. Hanna & Strong, 1949
- Conus angolensis Paes Da Franca, 1957: synonym of Conus zebroides Kiener, 1848
- Conus angulatus A. Adams, 1855: synonym of Conus regularis G. B. Sowerby I, 1833
- Conus anosyensis Bozzetti, 2008: synonym of Conus balteatus G. B. Sowerby I, 1833
- Conus aphrodite Petuch, 1979: synonym of Conasprella aphrodite (Petuch, 1979)
- Conus arabicus Lamarck, 1810: synonym of Conus litteratus Linnaeus, 1758
- Conus arachnoideus Gmelin, 1791: synonym of Conus araneosus [Lightfoot], 1786
- Conus araneosus Hwass, 1792: synonym of Conus araneosus [Lightfoot], 1786
- Conus arausiensis Reeve, 1843: synonym of Conus daucus daucus Hwass in Bruguière, 1792 represented as Conus daucus Hwass in Bruguière, 1792
- Conus arawak (Petuch & R. F. Myers, 2014): synonym of Conasprella arawak (Petuch & R. F. Myers, 2014)
- Conus arbornatalis da Motta, 1978: synonym of Conus amadis Gmelin, 1791
- Conus archetypus Crosse, 1865: synonym of Conus ziczac archetypus Crosse, 1865
- Conus archiepiscopus Hwass in Bruguière, 1792: synonym of Conus textile Linnaeus, 1758
- Conus architalassus [Lightfoot], 1786: synonym of Conus ammiralis Linnaeus, 1758
- Conus archithalassius Link, 1807: synonym of Conus pulcher [Lightfoot], 1786
- Conus arcuatus Broderip & G. B. Sowerby I, 1829: synonym of Conasprella arcuata (Broderip & G. B. Sowerby I, 1829)
- Conus armiger Crosse, 1858: synonym of Conasprella armiger (Crosse, 1858)
- Conus articulatus G. B. Sowerby II, 1873: synonym of Conasprella articulata (G. B. Sowerby II, 1873)
- Conus asper Lamarck, 1810: synonym of Conus sulcatus Hwass in Bruguière, 1792
- Conus aspersus G. B. Sowerby I, 1833: synonym of Conus ermineus Born, 1778
- Conus assimilis A. Adams, 1855: synonym of Conus magus Linnaeus, 1758
- Conus atractus Tomlin, 1937: synonym of Conus compressus G. B. Sowerby II, 1866
- Conus atramentosus Reeve, 1849: synonym of Lovellona atramentosa (Reeve, 1849)
- Conus augur Hwass in Bruguière, 1792: synonym of Conus augur [Lightfoot], 1786
- Conus auratus Hwass in Bruguière, 1792: synonym of Conus aulicus Linnaeus, 1758
- Conus aureolus Sowerby II, 1858: synonym of Conus anabathrum Crosse, 1865
- Conus auricomus Lamarck, 1810: synonym of Conus aureus Hwass in Bruguière, 1792
- Conus aurora Lamarck, 1810: synonym of Conus tinianus Hwass in Bruguière, 1792
- Conus austini Rehder & Abbott, 1951: synonym of Conus cancellatus cancellatus Hwass in Bruguière, 1792 represented as Conus cancellatus Hwass in Bruguière, 1792
- Conus australis Lamarck, 1810: synonym of Conus australis Holten, 1802
- Conus australis Schröter, 1803: synonym of Conus mustelinus Hwass in Bruguière, 1792
- Conus baccatus G. B. Sowerby III, 1877: synonym of Conasprella baccata (G. B. Sowerby III, 1877)
- Conus badius Kiener, 1845: synonym of Conus namocanus Hwass in Bruguière, 1792
- Conus baiano Coltro, 2004: synonym of Conus abrolhosensis Petuch, 1987
- Conus baileyi Röckel & da Motta, 1979: synonym of Conasprella baileyi (Röckel & da Motta, 1979)
- Conus bajanensis Nowell-Usticke, 1968: synonym of Conasprella bajanensis (Nowell-Usticke, 1968)
- Conus barbadensis Hwass in Bruguière, 1792: synonym of Conus miliaris Hwass in Bruguière, 1792
- Conus baylei Jousseaume, 1872: synonym of Conus spurius baylei Jousseaume, 1872
- Conus beckeri G. B. Sowerby III, 1911: synonym of Conus pictus Reeve, 1843
- Conus beddomei G. B. Sowerby III, 1901: synonym of Conus ziczac ziczac Mühlfeld, 1816 represented as Conus ziczac Mühlfeld, 1816
- Conus bermudensis Clench, 1942: synonym of Conasprella mindana bermudensis (Clench, 1942)
- Conus bernardii Kiener, 1847: synonym of Conus cinereus Hwass in Bruguière, 1792
- Conus berschaueri (Petuch & R. F. Myers, 2014): synonym of Conasprella berschaueri (Petuch & R. F. Myers, 2014)
- Conus bertarollae Costa & Simone, 1997: synonym of Conus ziczac archetypus Crosse, 1865
- Conus bicolor G. B. Sowerby I, 1833: synonym of Conus litoglyphus Hwass in Bruguière, 1792
- Conus bicolor G. B. Sowerby I, 1833: synonym of Conus praecellens A. Adams, 1855
- Conus bicolor G. B. Sowerby I, 1833: synonym of Conus pulcher [Lightfoot], 1786
- Conus bifasciatus G. B. Sowerby II, 1857: synonym of Conus attenuatus Reeve, 1844
- Conus bifasciatus Gmelin, 1791: synonym of Conasprella centurio (Born, 1778)
- Conus biraghii (G. Raybaudi, 1992): synonym of Conasprella biraghii (G. Raybaudi Massilia, 1992)
- Conus bitleri da Motta, 1984: synonym of Conus cordigera G. B. Sowerby II, 1866
- Conus blainvillei Kiener, 1850: synonym of Conus fumigatus Hwass in Bruguière, 1792
- Conus blainvillii Vignard, 1829: synonym of Conus ammiralis Linnaeus, 1758
- Conus blatteus Shikama, 1979: synonym of Conus viola Cernohorsky, 1977
- Conus bocki G. B. Sowerby III, 1881: synonym of Conus sulcatus Hwass in Bruguière, 1792
- Conus bodarti Coltro, 2004: synonym of Conasprella iansa (Petuch, 1979)
- Conus boholensis Petuch, 1979: synonym of Conasprella boholensis (Petuch, 1979)
- Conus boivini Kiener, 1846: synonym of Conus gubernator Hwass in Bruguière, 1792
- Conus borbonicus H. Adams, 1868: synonym of Conus tulipa Linnaeus, 1758
- Conus borneensis G. B. Sowerby II, 1866: synonym of Conus magus Linnaeus, 1758
- Conus borneensis A. Adams & Reeve, 1848: synonym of Conasprella arcuata (Broderip & G. B. Sowerby I, 1829)
- Conus boschi Clover, 1972: synonym of Conus melvilli G. B. Sowerby III, 1879
- Conus boschorum Moolenbeek & Coomans, 1993: synonym of Pseudolilliconus boschorum (Moolenbeek & Coomans, 1993)
- Conus boubeeae G. B. Sowerby III, 1903: synonym of Conasprella pusio (Hwass in Bruguière, 1792)
- Conus boucheti Richard, 1983: synonym of Conasprella boucheti (Richard, 1983)
- Conus bougei G. B. Sowerby III, 1907: synonym of Conus exiguus Lamarck, 1810
- Conus bozzettii Lauer, 1991: synonym of Conasprella bozzettii (Lauer, 1991)
- Conus branhamae Clench, 1953: synonym of Conasprella jaspidea pealii (Green, 1830)
- Conus brasiliensis Clench, 1942: synonym of Conus ziczac archetypus Crosse, 1865
- Conus brazieri G. B. Sowerby III, 1881: synonym of Conus circumcisus Born, 1778
- Conus brettinghami Coomans, Moolenbeek & Wils, 1982: synonym of Conus sulcatus Hwass in Bruguière, 1792
- Conus breviculus G. B. Sowerby I, 1833: synonym of Conus pulcher [Lightfoot], 1786
- Conus brevis E. A. Smith, 1877: synonym of Conus caracteristicus Fischer von Waldheim, 1807
- Conus brontodes Shikama, 1979: synonym of Conus kinoshitai (Kuroda, 1956)
- Conus bruguieresi Kiener, 1845: synonym of Conus bruguieri Kiener, 1846
- Conus bruguiersi Kiener, 1846: synonym of Conus bruguieri Kiener, 1846
- Conus buxeus Reeve, 1844: synonym of Conus furvus Reeve, 1843
- Conus cabritii Bernardi, 1858: synonym of Conus exiguus Lamarck, 1810
- Conus caelatus A. Adams, 1855: synonym of Conus marchionatus Hinds, 1843
- Conus caerulans Küster, 1838: synonym of Conus ermineus Born, 1778
- Conus caerulescens Lamarck, 1810: synonym of Conus cinereus Hwass in Bruguière, 1792
- Conus caffer Krauss, 1848: synonym of Conus mozambicus Hwass in Bruguière, 1792
- Conus caillaudi Jay, 1846: synonym of Conus ventricosus Gmelin, 1791
- Conus cakobaui Moolenbeek, Röckel, & Bouchet, 2008: synonym of Profundiconus cakobaui (Moolenbeek, Röckel & Bouchet, 2008)
- Conus caledonicus Hwass in Bruguière, 1792: synonym of Conus cedonulli Linnaeus, 1767
- Conus californicus Reeve, 1844: synonym of Californiconus californicus (Reeve, 1844)
- Conus canaliculatus Dillwyn, 1817: synonym of Conus malacanus Hwass in Bruguière, 1792
- Conus candidus Kiener, 1847: synonym of Conus philippii Kiener, 1847
- Conus capricorni Van Mol, Tursch & Kempf, 1967: synonym of Conus cancellatus capricorni Van Mol, Tursch & Kempf, 1967
- Conus caracanus Hwass in Bruguière, 1792: synonym of Conus cedonulli insularis Gmelin, 1791: synonym of Conus cedonulli Linnaeus, 1767
- Conus caribbaeus Clench, 1942: synonym of Conus flavescens caribbaeus Clench, 1942
- Conus carinatus Swainson, 1822: synonym of Conus magus Linnaeus, 1758
- Conus carmeli Tenison-Woods, 1877: synonym of Conus anemone Lamarck, 1810
- Conus carpenteri Crosse, 1865: synonym of Conus litoglyphus Hwass in Bruguière, 1792
- Conus carpenterianus (Gabb, 1865): synonym of Megasurcula carpenteriana (Gabb, 1865)
- Conus castrensis Gould, 1842: synonym of Conus thalassiarchus G. B. Sowerby I, 1834
- Conus castus Reeve, 1844: synonym of Conus daucus daucus Hwass in Bruguière, 1792 represented as Conus daucus Hwass in Bruguière, 1792
- Conus catenatus G. B. Sowerby III, 1879: synonym of Conus granarius Kiener, 1847
- Conus cavailloni Fenaux, 1942: synonym of Conus inscriptus Reeve, 1843
- Conus cebuganus da Motta & Martin, 1982: synonym of Conus australis Holten, 1802
- Conus cecilei Kiener, 1847: synonym of Conus furvus Reeve, 1843
- Conus ceciliae Crosse, 1858: synonym of Conus capitaneus Linnaeus, 1758
- Conus centurio Born, 1778: synonym of Conasprella centurio (Born, 1778)
- † Conus cercadensis Maury, 1917: synonym of † Conasprella cercadensis (Maury, 1917)
- Conus cerinus Reeve, 1848: synonym of Conus boeticus Reeve, 1844
- Conus cernicus H. Adams, 1869: synonym of Conus balteatus G. B. Sowerby I, 1833
- Conus cernohorskyi da Motta, 1983: synonym of Conus magus Linnaeus, 1758
- Conus cervus sensu G. B. Sowerby I, 1838: synonym of Conus cuvieri Crosse, 1858
- Conus ceylanensis Hwass in Bruguière, 1792: synonym of Conus musicus Hwass in Bruguière, 1792
- Conus ceylonicus Reeve, 1849: synonym of Conus zeylanicus Gmelin, 1791
- Conus ceylonicus G. B. Sowerby II, 1857: synonym of Conus zeylanicus Gmelin, 1791
- Conus characteristicus Dillwyn, 1817: synonym of Conus caracteristicus Fischer von Waldheim, 1807
- Conus chemnitzii Dillwyn, 1817: synonym of Conus rattus Hwass in Bruguière, 1792
- Conus chenui Crosse, 1857: synonym of Conus ferrugineus Hwass in Bruguière, 1792
- Conus chersoideus Nardo, 1847: synonym of Conus ventricosus Gmelin, 1791
- Conus chinoi Shikama, 1970: synonym of Conus distans Hwass in Bruguière, 1792
- Conus cholmondeleyi Melvill, 1900: synonym of Conus textile Linnaeus, 1758
- Conus chrysocestus Berry, 1968: synonym of Conus xanthicus Dall, 1910
- Conus chusaki da Motta, 1978: synonym of Conus striatus Linnaeus, 1758
- Conus cibielii Kiener, 1849: synonym of Conus gladiator Broderip, 1833
- Conus cidaris Kiener, 1846: synonym of Conus magellanicus Hwass in Bruguière, 1792
- Conus cinctus Swainson, 1822: synonym of Conus circumactus Iredale, 1929
- Conus cinctus Valenciennes, 1832: synonym of Conasprella emarginata (Reeve, 1844)
- Conus cinctus Bosc, 1801: synonym of Conus ventricosus Gmelin, 1791
- Conus cingulatus G. B. Sowerby I, 1825: synonym of Conus adamsonii Broderip, 1836
- Conus cingulum Gmelin, 1791: synonym of Conus quercinus [Lightfoot], 1786
- Conus circae G. B. Sowerby II, 1858: synonym of Conus magus Linnaeus, 1758
- Conus circumclausus Fenaux, 1942: synonym of Conus balteatus G. B. Sowerby I, 1833
- Conus circumsignatus Crosse, 1865: synonym of Conus floccatus G. B. Sowerby I, 1841
- Conus citrinus Kiener, 1846: synonym of Conus cocceus Reeve, 1844
- Conus citrinus Gmelin, 1791: synonym of Conus regius Gmelin, 1791
- Conus clandestinatous Shikama, 1979: synonym of Conus voluminalis Reeve, 1843
- Conus clandestinus Shikama, 1979: synonym of Conus shikamai Coomans, Moolenbeek & Wils, 1985
- Conus clarki Rehder & Abbott, 1951: synonym of Conasprella armiger (Crosse, 1858)
- Conus clenchi Martins, 1945: synonym of Conus lemniscatus Reeve, 1849
- Conus clodianus Nardo, 1847: synonym of Conus ventricosus Gmelin, 1791
- Conus clytospira Melvill & Standen, 1899: synonym of Conus milneedwardsi clytospira Melvill & Standen, 1899
- Conus coelebs Hinds, 1843: synonym of Conus terebra Born, 1778
- Conus coerulescens Schröter, 1803: synonym of Conus ermineus Born, 1778
- Conus coletteae (Petuch, 2013): synonym of Conasprella mcgintyi (Pilsbry, 1955)
- Conus colorovariegatus Kosuge, 1981: synonym of Conus neptunus Reeve, 1843
- Conus colubrinus Lamarck, 1810: synonym of Conus pennaceus Born, 1778
- Conus columba Hwass in Bruguière, 1792: synonym of Conasprella puncticulata columba (Hwass in Bruguière, 1792)
- Conus comatosa Pilsbry, 1904: synonym of Conasprella comatosa (Pilsbry, 1904)
- Conus communis Swainson, 1840: synonym of Conus textile Linnaeus, 1758
- Conus complanatus G. B. Sowerby II, 1866: synonym of Conus victoriae Reeve, 1843
- Conus comptus A. Adams, 1855: synonym of Conus papilliferus G. B. Sowerby I, 1834
- Conus comptus Gould, 1853: synonym of Conus purpurascens G. B. Sowerby I, 1833
- Conus concatenatus Kiener, 1850: synonym of Conus textile Linnaeus, 1758
- Conus concinnulus Crosse, 1858: synonym of Parametaria dupontii (Kiener, 1846)
- Conus concinnus Broderip, 1833: synonym of Parametaria dupontii (Kiener, 1846)
- Conus concinnus G. B. Sowerby II, 1866: synonym of Conus biliosus (Röding, 1798)
- Conus concolor G. B. Sowerby II, 1841: synonym of Conus hyaena concolor G. B. Sowerby II, 1841
- Conus condensus G. B. Sowerby II, 1866: synonym of Conus canonicus Hwass in Bruguière, 1792
- Conus connectens A. Adams, 1855: synonym of Conus daucus Hwass in Bruguière, 1792
- Conus consanguineus E. A. Smith, 1880: synonym of Conus fergusoni G. B. Sowerby II, 1873
- Conus consul Boivin, 1864: synonym of Conus magus Linnaeus, 1758
- Conus contusus Reeve, 1848: synonym of Conus monachus Linnaeus, 1758
- Conus convolutus G. B. Sowerby II, 1858: synonym of Conus omaria Hwass in Bruguière, 1792
- Conus cooki Brazier, 1870: synonym of Conus aplustre Reeve, 1843
- Conus coralinus Habe & Kosuge, 1970: synonym of Conus klemae (Cotton, 1953)
- Conus corbula G. B. Sowerby II, 1858: synonym of Conus textile Linnaeus, 1758
- Conus coriolisi Röckel, Richard & Moolenbeek, 1995: synonym of Conasprella coriolisi (Röckel, Richard & Moolenbeek, 1995)
- Conus coromandelicus E. A. Smith, 1894: synonym of Conasprella coromandelica (E. A. Smith, 1894)
- Conus coronatus Reeve, 1849: synonym of Mitromorpha coronata (Reeve, 1849)
- Conus corrugatus G. B. Sowerby II, 1870: synonym of Conasprella jaspidea (Gmelin, 1791)
- Conus cossignanii (Cossignani & Fiadeiro, 2014): synonym of Conus maioensis Trovão, Rolán & Félix-Alves, 1990
- Conus costatus Holten, 1802: synonym of Conus sulcatus Hwass in Bruguière, 1792
- Conus couderti Bernardi, 1860: synonym of Conus erythraeensis Reeve, 1843
- Conus coxeni Brazier, 1875: synonym of Conus cyanostoma A. Adams, 1855
- Conus coxianus G. B. Sowerby III, 1895: synonym of Conus locumtenens Blumenbach, 1791
- Conus crassus G. B. Sowerby II, 1858: synonym of Conus eburneus Hwass in Bruguière, 1792
- Conus crebrisulcatus G. B. Sowerby II, 1857: synonym of Conasprella jaspidea (Gmelin, 1791)
- Conus crenulatus Kiener, 1850: synonym of Conasprella armiger (Crosse, 1858)
- Conus crepusculum Reeve, 1844: synonym of Conus furvus Reeve, 1843
- Conus cretaceus Kiener, 1847: synonym of Conasprella mindana (Hwass in Bruguière, 1792)
- Conus cretheus Nardo, 1847: synonym of Conus ventricosus Gmelin, 1791
- Conus cristinapessoae (Cossignani & Fiadeiro, 2017): synonym of Conus fuscoflavus Röckel, Rolán & A. Monteiro, 1980
- Conus croceus G. B. Sowerby I, 1833: synonym of Conus daucus daucus Hwass in Bruguière, 1792 represented as Conus daucus Hwass in Bruguière, 1792
- Conus croceus E. A. Smith, 1877: synonym of Conasprella hypochlorus (Tomlin, 1937)
- Conus crosseanus Bernardi, 1861: synonym of Conus marmoreus Linnaeus, 1758
- Conus cumingii Reeve, 1849: synonym of Conus virgatus Reeve, 1849
- Conus cuneatus G. B. Sowerby II, 1873: synonym of Conus malacanus Hwass in Bruguière, 1792
- Conus cuneiformis E. A. Smith, 1877: synonym of Conus inscriptus Reeve, 1843
- Conus dactylosus Kiener, 1847: synonym of Conus auricomus Hwass in Bruguière, 1792
- Conus damasoi Cossignani, 2007: synonym of Conasprella damasoi (Cossignani, 2007)
- Conus damasomonteiroi (Petuch & Myers, 2014): synonym of Conasprella damasomonteiroi (Petuch & Myers, 2014)
- Conus danieli Crosse, 1858: synonym of Conus algoensis G. B. Sowerby I, 1834
- Conus daullei Crosse, 1858: synonym of Conus consors G. B. Sowerby I, 1833
- Conus dautzenbergi Fenaux, 1942: synonym of Conus imperialis Linnaeus, 1758
- Conus debilis Fenaux, 1943: synonym of Conus auricomus Hwass in Bruguière, 1792
- Conus deburghiae G. B. Sowerby II, 1857: synonym of Conus nocturnus [Lightfoot], 1786
- Conus decrepitus Kiener, 1847: synonym of Conus cocceus Reeve, 1844
- Conus delanoyi Trovão, 1979: synonym of Conus delanoyae Trovão, 1979
- Conus delessertii Récluz, 1843: synonym of Conasprella delessertii (Récluz, 1843)
- Conus delicatus Schepman, 1913: synonym of Conasprella aculeiformis (Reeve, 1844)
- Conus delucai Coltro, 2004: synonym of Conasprella iansa (Petuch, 1979)
- Conus dentatus Schröter, 1803: synonym of Imbricaria punctata (Swainson, 1821)
- Conus deprehendens Prelle, 2009: synonym of Conus betulinus Linnaeus, 1758
- Conus deshayesii Reeve, 1843: synonym of Conus cuvieri Crosse, 1858
- Conus desmotus Tomlin, 1937: synonym of Conus granarius Kiener, 1847
- Conus dictator Melvill, 1898: synonym of Conasprella dictator (Melvill, 1898)
- Conus dieteri Moolenbeek, Zandbergen & Bouchet, 2008: synonym of Conasprella dieteri (Moolenbeek, Zandbergen & Bouchet, 2008)
- Conus dilectus Gould, 1850: synonym of Conus textile Linnaeus, 1758
- Conus dillwynii Reeve, 1849: synonym of Conus erythraeensis Reeve, 1843
- Conus discrepans G. B. Sowerby I, 1833: synonym of Conus catus Hwass in Bruguière, 1792
- Conus dolium Boivin, 1864: synonym of Conus pica A. Adams & Reeve, 1848
- Conus dondani Kosuge, 1981: synonym of Profundiconus dondani (Kosuge, 1981)
- Conus douvillei Fenaux, 1942: synonym of Conus imperialis Linnaeus, 1758
- Conus drangai Schwengel, 1955: synonym of Conus orion Broderip, 1833
- Conus duplicatus G. B. Sowerby I, 1823: synonym of Conus australis Holten, 1802
- Conus dupontii Kiener, 1846: synonym of Parametaria dupontii (Kiener, 1846)
- Conus duvali Bernardi, 1862: synonym of Conasprella pusio (Hwass in Bruguière, 1792)
- Conus dux Hwass in Bruguière, 1792: synonym of Conus circumcisus Born, 1778
- Conus dux Röding, 1798: synonym of Conus maldivus Hwass in Bruguière, 1792
- Conus echinulatus Kiener, 1848: synonym of Conasprella puncticulata (Hwass in Bruguière, 1792)
- Conus edentulus Reeve, 1844: synonym of Mitra (Dibaphus) edentula Swainson, 1823 represented as Mitra edentula Swainson, 1823
- Conus eduardi Delsaerdt, 1997: synonym of Conus milneedwardsi eduardi Delsaerdt, 1997
- Conus edwardi Preston, 1908: synonym of Conus zonatus Hwass in Bruguière, 1792
- Conus egregius G. B. Sowerby III, 1914: synonym of Conus quercinus [Lightfoot], 1786
- Conus elegans G. B. Sowerby III, 1895: synonym of Conasprella elegans (G. B. Sowerby III, 1895)
- Conus elegans Schepman, 1913: synonym of Conus comatosa Pilsbry, 1904: synonym of Conasprella comatosa (Pilsbry, 1904)
- Conus elokismenos Kilburn, 1975: synonym of Conasprella elokismenos (Kilburn, 1975)
- Conus elisae Kiener, 1846: synonym of Conus pennaceus Born, 1778
- Conus elongatus Reeve, 1843: synonym of Conus moreleti Crosse, 1858
- Conus elventinus Duclos, 1833: synonym of Conasprella mindana (Hwass in Bruguière, 1792)
- Conus emarginatus Reeve, 1844: synonym of Conasprella emarginata (Reeve, 1844)
- Conus emersoni G. D. Hanna, 1963: synonym of Profundiconus emersoni (Hanna, 1963)
- Conus epaphus Nardo, 1847: synonym of Conus ventricosus Gmelin, 1791
- Conus epaticus Renier, 1804: synonym of Conus ventricosus Gmelin, 1791
- Conus episcopus Hwass in Bruguière, 1792: synonym of Conus pennaceus Born, 1778
- Conus epistomioides Weinkauff, 1875: synonym of Conus magus Linnaeus, 1758
- Conus epistomium Reeve, 1844: synonym of Conus magus Linnaeus, 1758
- Conus eques Hwass in Bruguière, 1792: synonym of Conus ermineus Born, 1778
- Conus ericmonnieri (Petuch & R. F. Myers, 2014): synonym of Conasprella ericmonnieri (Petuch & R. F. Myers, 2014)
- Conus errosus Renier, 1804: synonym of Conus ventricosus Gmelin, 1791
- Conus erythraeozonatus Barros e Cunha, 1933: synonym of Conus flavidus Lamarck, 1810
- Conus eucoronatus G. B. Sowerby III, 1903: synonym of Conasprella eucoronata (G. B. Sowerby III, 1903)
- Conus euetrios G. B. Sowerby III, 1882: synonym of Conus textile Linnaeus, 1758
- Conus eugrammatus Bartsch & Rehder, 1943: synonym of Conasprella eugrammata (Bartsch & Rehder, 1943)
- Conus eumitus Tomlin, 1926: synonym of Conus textile Linnaeus, 1758
- Conus euschemon Tomlin, 1937: synonym of Conus timorensis Hwass in Bruguière, 1792
- Conus evelynae G. B. Sowerby III, 1882: synonym of Conus gladiator Broderip, 1833
- Conus exaratus Reeve, 1844: synonym of Conus cinereus Hwass in Bruguière, 1792
- Conus excavatus G. B. Sowerby II, 1866: synonym of Conus fumigatus Hwass in Bruguière, 1792
- Conus exdeshayesi Sacco, 1893: synonym of Conus cuvieri Crosse, 1858
- Conus exquisitus G. B. Sowerby III, 1887: synonym of Conus cardinalis Hwass in Bruguière, 1792
- Conus exumaensis (Petuch, 2013): synonym of Conasprella jaspidea (Gmelin, 1791)
- Conus fabula G. B. Sowerby I, 1833: synonym of Conus coffeae Gmelin, 1791
- Conus fasciatus G. B. Sowerby II, 1858: synonym of Conus ochroleucus Gmelin, 1791
- Conus fasciatus Kiener, 1850: synonym of Conus splendidulus G. B. Sowerby I, 1833
- Conus fasciatus A. Adams, 1855: synonym of Conus attenuatus Reeve, 1844
- Conus fasciatus Perry, 1811: synonym of Conus genuanus Linnaeus, 1758
- Conus felinus Link, 1807: synonym of Conus spectrum Linnaeus, 1758
- Conus fenzani (Petuch & Sargent, 2011): synonym of Conasprella fenzani (Petuch & Sargent, 2011)
- Conus fernandi (Petuch & Berschauer, 2018): synonym of Conus mercator Linnaeus, 1758
- Conus ferrugatus G. B. Sowerby I, 1834: synonym of Conus monilifer Broderip, 1833
- Conus festivus Dillwyn, 1817: synonym of Conus pertusus Hwass in Bruguière, 1792
- Conus fijiensis Moolenbeek, Röckel & Bouchet, 2008: synonym of Conasprella fijiensis (Moolenbeek, Röckel & Bouchet, 2008)
- Conus filamentosus Reeve, 1849: synonym of Conus spectrum Linnaeus, 1758
- Conus filicinctus Schepman, 1913: synonym of Conus voluminalis Reeve, 1843
- Conus finkli Petuch, 1987: synonym of Conus cancellatus finkli Petuch, 1987
- Conus flammeus Lamarck, 1810: synonym of Conus spurius lorenzianus Dillwyn, 1817
- Conus fletcheri Petuch & Mendenhall, 1972: synonym of Conus pergrandis (Iredale, 1937)
- Conus flindersi Brazier, 1898: synonym of Conus anemone Lamarck, 1810
- Conus floridanus Gabb, 1869: synonym of Conus anabathrum anabathrum Crosse, 1865 represented Conus anabathrum Crosse, 1865
- Conus floridensis G. B. Sowerby II, 1870: synonym of Conus anabathrum Crosse, 1865
- Conus floridus G. B. Sowerby II, 1858: synonym of Conus striatus Linnaeus, 1758
- Conus fluctifer Dillwyn, 1817: synonym of Conus pulcher [Lightfoot], 1786
- Conus fluviamaris Petuch & Sargent, 2011: synonym of Conasprella fluviamaris (Petuch & Sargent, 2011)
- Conus fortdauphinensis (Bozzetti, 2015): synonym of Conus praelatus Hwass in Bruguière, 1792
- Conus fortis Renier, 1804: synonym of Conus ventricosus Gmelin, 1791
- Conus fosteri Clench, 1942: synonym of Conus villepinii P. Fischer & Bernardi, 1857
- Conus franciscanus Bruguière, 1792: synonym of Conus ventricosus Gmelin, 1791
- Conus frauenfeldi Crosse, 1865: synonym of Conus magus Linnaeus, 1758
- Conus frausseni Tenorio & Poppe, 2004: synonym of Profundiconus frausseni (Tenorio & Poppe, 2004)
- Conus frisbeyae Clench & Pulley, 1952: synonym of Conasprella armiger (Crosse, 1858)
- Conus frostianus Brazier, 1898: synonym of Conus monachus Linnaeus, 1758
- Conus fucatus Reeve, 1849: synonym of Conus magus Linnaeus, 1758
- Conus fulgetrum G. B. Sowerby I, 1834: synonym of Conus miliaris Hwass in Bruguière, 1792
- Conus fulgurans Hwass in Bruguière, 1792: synonym of Conus fulmineus Gmelin, 1791
- Conus fultoni G. B. Sowerby III, 1887: synonym of Conus boeticus Reeve, 1844
- Conus fulvobullatus da Motta, 1982: synonym of Conus magus Linnaeus, 1758
- Conus fulvocinctus Crosse, 1872: synonym of Conus fergusoni G. B. Sowerby II, 1873
- Conus fulvostriatus Fenaux, 1942: synonym of Conus quercinus [Lightfoot], 1786
- Conus fulvus Fenaux, 1943: synonym of Conus flavescens G. B. Sowerby I, 1834
- Conus fulvus G. B. Sowerby III, 1889: synonym of Conus tinianus Hwass in Bruguière, 1792
- Conus fuscatus Born, 1778: synonym of Conus imperialis Linnaeus, 1758
- Conus fuscomaculatus E. A. Smith, 1877: synonym of Conus stramineus Lamarck, 1810
- Conus fusiformis Lamarck, 1810: synonym of Conus compressus G. B. Sowerby II, 1866
- Conus fusiformis Pease, 1861: synonym of Conus parvus Pease, 1868: synonym of Lovellona peaseana Finlay, 1927
- Conus fusiformis Fischer von Waldheim, 1807: synonym of Conus glans Hwass in Bruguière, 1792
- Conus fustigatus Hwass in Bruguière, 1792: synonym of Conus pulicarius Hwass in Bruguière, 1792
- Conus fusus Gmelin, 1791: synonym of Conus terebra Born, 1778
- Conus gabrielae Rolán & Röckel, 2000: synonym of Conus negroides Kaicher, 1977
- Conus gabrielii Kiener, 1846: synonym of Conus cinereus Hwass in Bruguière, 1792
- Conus gabryae Röckel & Korn, 1992: synonym of Conus australis Holten, 1802
- Conus gadesi Espinosa & Ortea, 2005: synonym of Conus regius Gmelin, 1791
- Conus gallopalvoi (Cossignani & Fiadeiro, 2017): synonym of Conus fuscoflavus Röckel, Rolán & A. Monteiro, 1980
- Conus galloprovincialis Locard, 1886: synonym of Conus ventricosus Gmelin, 1791
- Conus gambiensis (Petuch & Berschauer, 2018): synonym of Conus guinaicus Hwass in Bruguière, 1792
- Conus gattegnoi Poppe & Tagaro, 2017: synonym of Conasprella gattegnoi (Poppe & Tagaro, 2017)
- † Conus gaza Johnson & Pilsbry, 1911: synonym of † Conus multiliratus Böse, 1906
- Conus geeraertsi Poppe & Tagaro, 2017
- Conus gemmulatus G. B. Sowerby II, 1870: synonym of Conus acutangulus Lamarck, 1810
- Conus gigas Fischer von Waldheim, 1807: synonym of Conus pulcher [Lightfoot], 1786
- Conus gilberti (Bozzetti, 2012): synonym of Conus balteatus G. B. Sowerby I, 1833
- Conus gilchristi G. B. Sowerby III, 1903: synonym of Conus natalis G. B. Sowerby II, 1858
- Conus glaucescens G. B. Sowerby I, 1834: synonym of Conus ventricosus Gmelin, 1791
- Conus gloria Bosc, 1801: synonym of Conus gloriamaris Chemnitz, 1777
- Conus gloriamaris Perry, 1810: synonym of Conus textile Linnaeus, 1758
- Conus gloynei G. B. Sowerby III, 1881: synonym of Conus gladiator Broderip, 1833
- Conus gordyi Röckel & Bondarev, 2000: synonym of Conasprella gordyi (Röckel & Bondarev, 2000)
- Conus gracianus da Motta & Blöcher, 1982: synonym of Conus aulicus Linnaeus, 1758
- Conus gracilis G. B. Sowerby I, 1823: synonym of Conus australis Holten, 1802
- Conus gracilis Wood, 1828: synonym of Conus timorensis Hwass in Bruguière, 1792
- Conus gracilis G. B. Sowerby III, 1875: synonym of Conasprella hopwoodi (Tomlin, 1937)
- Conus gradatus Reeve, 1843: synonym of Conus scalarissimus da Motta, 1988
- Conus grandis G. B. Sowerby I, 1823: synonym of Conus pulcher [Lightfoot], 1786
- Conus granifer Reeve, 1849: synonym of Conus furvus Reeve, 1843
- Conus grayi Reeve, 1844: synonym of Conus ermineus Born, 1778
- Conus grenadensis Hwass in Bruguière, 1792: synonym of Conus cedonulli Linnaeus, 1767
- Conus griseus Kiener, 1846: synonym of Conus ambiguus Reeve, 1844
- Conus grohi Tenorio & Poppe, 2004: synonym of Conasprella grohi (Tenorio & Poppe, 2004)
- Conus grondini Larue, 1995: synonym of Conus moluccensis Küster, 1838
- Conus grossii Maravigna, 1853: synonym of Conus ventricosus Gmelin, 1791
- Conus grueneri Reeve, 1844: synonym of Conus litteratus Linnaeus, 1758
- Conus gubba Kiener, 1848: synonym of Conus cinereus Hwass in Bruguière, 1792
- Conus guestieri Lorois, 1860: synonym of Conus ventricosus Gmelin, 1791
- Conus guiandradoi (Cossignani & Fiadeiro, 2017): synonym of Conus josephinae Rolán, 1980
- Conus guidopoppei Raybaudi Massilia, 2005: synonym of Conasprella guidopoppei (G. Raybaudi Massilia, 2005)
- Conus guttatus Kiener, 1848: synonym of Conus lineopunctatus Kaicher, 1977
- Conus guyanensis Van Mol, 1973: synonym of Conasprella guyanensis (Van Mol, 1973)
- Conus halitropus Bartsch & Rehder, 1943: synonym of Conus obscurus G. B. Sowerby I, 1833
- Conus halli da Motta, 1983: synonym of Conus hyaena Hwass in Bruguière, 1792
- Conus hamilli Crosse, 1858: synonym of Conus erythraeensis Reeve, 1843
- Conus hammatus Bartsch & Rehder, 1943: synonym of Conus circumactus Iredale, 1929
- Conus hanleyi G. B. Sowerby II, 1857: synonym of Conus ventricosus Gmelin, 1791
- Conus hawaiensis Kaicher, 1956: synonym of Conus suturatus Reeve, 1844
- Conus hayesi Korn, 2001: synonym of Conus brianhayesi Korn, 2001
- Conus hedgesi G. B. Sowerby III, 1913: synonym of Conus iodostoma Reeve, 1843
- Conus henckesi Coltro, 2004: synonym of Conasprella henckesi (Coltro, 2004)
- Conus henoquei Bernardi, 1860: synonym of Conus fumigatus Hwass in Bruguière, 1792
- Conus henriquei (Petuch & R. F. Myers, 2014): synonym of Conasprella henriquei (Petuch & R. F. Myers, 2014)
- Conus hepaticus Kiener, 1847: synonym of Conus quercinus [Lightfoot], 1786
- Conus hereditarius da Motta, 1987: synonym of Conus ammiralis Linnaeus, 1758
- Conus herillus Nardo, 1847: synonym of Conus ventricosus Gmelin, 1791
- Conus herndli (Petuch & R. F. Myers, 2014): synonym of Conasprella herndli (Petuch & R. F. Myers, 2014)
- Conus hevassii A. Adams, 1855: synonym of Conus varius Linnaeus, 1758
- Conus hivanus Moolenbeek, Zandbergen & Bouchet, 2008: synonym of Conasprella hivana (Moolenbeek, Zandbergen & Bouchet, 2008)
- Conus holemani Nowell-Usticke, 1968: synonym of Conus cedonulli Linnaeus, 1767
- Conus hopwoodi Tomlin, 1937: synonym of Conasprella hopwoodi (Tomlin, 1937)
- Conus howelli Iredale, 1929: synonym of Conasprella howelli (Iredale, 1929)
- Conus huberi Thach, 2018: synonym of Conus striatus Linnaeus, 1758
- Conus huberorum da Motta, 1989: synonym of Conus buxeus loroisii Kiener, 1846
- Conus humilis von Salis Marschlins, 1793: synonym of Conus ventricosus Gmelin, 1791
- Conus hunti Wils & Moolenbeek, 1979: synonym of Conus sanderi Wils & Moolenbeek, 1979
- † Conus huttoni (Tate, 1890): synonym of † Conilithes huttoni (Tate, 1890)
- Conus hybridus Kiener, 1845: synonym of Conus franciscanus Hwass in Bruguière, 1792
- Conus hypochlorus Tomlin, 1937: synonym of Conasprella hypochlorus (Tomlin, 1937)
- Conus iansa Petuch, 1979: synonym of Conasprella iansa (Petuch, 1979)
- Conus iberogermanicus Röckel, Rolán & Monteiro, 1980: synonym of Conus irregularis G. B. Sowerby II, 1858
- Conus ichinoseanus (Kuroda, 1956): synonym of Conasprella ichinoseana (Kuroda, 1956)
- Conus ignobilis Olivi, 1792: synonym of Conus ventricosus Gmelin, 1791
- Conus iheringi Frenguelli, 1946: synonym of Conus carcellesi Martins, 1945
- Conus ikedai Ninomiya, 1987: synonym of Profundiconus ikedai (Ninomiya, 1987)
- Conus imperator Woolacott, 1956: synonym of Conus biliosus parvulus Link, 1807
- Conus inaequalis Reeve, 1849: synonym of Conus ventricosus Gmelin, 1791
- Conus incarnatus Reeve, 1844: synonym of Conus hyaena Hwass in Bruguière, 1792
- Conus incinctus Fenaux, 1942: synonym of Conus anemone Lamarck, 1810
- Conus incurvus G. B. Sowerby I, 1833: synonym of Conus regularis G. B. Sowerby I, 1833
- Conus induratus Reeve, 1849: synonym of Conus erythraeensis Reeve, 1843
- Conus inermis Tinker, 1952: synonym of Conus litoglyphus Hwass in Bruguière, 1792
- Conus informis Hwass in Bruguière, 1792: synonym of Conus mozambicus Hwass in Bruguière, 1792
- Conus innexus A. Adams, 1855: synonym of Conus consors G. B. Sowerby I, 1833
- Conus innotabilis E. A. Smith, 1892: synonym of Conus cyanostoma A. Adams, 1855
- Conus inquinatus Reeve, 1849: synonym of Conus ermineus Born, 1778
- Conus insculptus Kiener, 1845: synonym of Conasprella insculpta (Kiener, 1847)
- Conus insignis G. B. Sowerby I, 1833: synonym of Conus locumtenens Blumenbach, 1791
- Conus insularis Gmelin, 1791: synonym of Conus cedonulli Linnaeus, 1767
- Conus intermedius Lamarck, 1810: synonym of Conus ventricosus Gmelin, 1791
- Conus intermedius Reeve, 1843: synonym of Conus eldredi Morrison, 1955
- Conus interruptus Wood, 1828: synonym of Conus brunneus Wood, 1828
- Conus interruptus Broderip & G. B. Sowerby I, 1829: synonym of Conasprella ximenes (Gray, 1839)
- Conus ione Fulton, 1938: synonym of Conasprella ione (Fulton, 1938)
- Conus istriensis Nardo, 1847: synonym of Conus ventricosus Gmelin, 1791
- Conus jacquescolombi (Monnier & Limpalaër, 2016): synonym of Conus riosi Petuch, 1986
- Conus jamaicensis Hwass in Bruguière, 1792: synonym of Conus ventricosus Gmelin, 1791
- Conus janowskyae (Tucker & Tenorio, 2011): synonym of Conasprella janowskyae (Tucker & Tenorio, 2011)
- Conus japonicus Hwass in Bruguière, 1792: synonym of Conasprella spirofilis (Habe & Kosuge, 1970)
- Conus jaspideus Gmelin, 1791: synonym of Conasprella jaspidea (Gmelin, 1791)
- Conus jeanmartini G. Raybaudi Massilia, 1992: synonym of Profundiconus jeanmartini G. Raybaudi Massilia, 1992
- Conus jeffreyi (Petuch & Sargent, 2011): synonym of Conus quercinus [Lightfoot], 1786
- Conus joliveti Moolenbeek, Röckel & Bouchet, 2008: synonym of Conasprella joliveti (Moolenbeek, Röckel & Bouchet, 2008)
- Conus josegeraldoi (Cossignani & Fiadeiro, 2018): synonym of Conus crotchii Reeve, 1849
- Conus joserochoi (Cossignani, 2014): synonym of Conus delanoyae Trovão, 1979
- Conus jousseaumei Couturier, 1891: synonym of Conus thomae Gmelin, 1791
- Conus jukesii Reeve, 1848: synonym of Conus papilliferus G. B. Sowerby I, 1834
- Conus juliae Clench, 1942: synonym of Conus amphiurgus Dall, 1889
- Conus kanakinus Richard, 1983: synonym of Profundiconus kanakinus (Richard, 1983)
- Conus kantanganus da Motta, 1982: synonym of Conasprella longurionis (Kiener, 1847)
- Conus karinae Nowell-Usticke, 1968: synonym of Conasprella mindana (Hwass in Bruguière, 1792)
- Conus keatiformis Shikama, 1977: synonym of Conus inscriptus Reeve, 1843
- Conus keatii G. B. Sowerby II, 1858: synonym of Conus inscriptus Reeve, 1843
- Conus kenyonae Brazier, 1896: synonym of Conus distans Hwass in Bruguière, 1792
- Conus kieneri Crosse, 1858: synonym of Conus cocceus Reeve, 1844
- Conus kimioi (Habe, 1965): synonym of Conasprella kimioi (Habe, 1965)
- Conus kintoki Coomans & Moolenbeek, 1982: synonym of Conus kintoki Habe & Kosuge, 1970
- † Conus kitteredgei Maury, 1917: synonym of † Conasprella kitteredgei (Maury, 1917)
- Conus knudseni Sander, 1982: synonym of Conus sanderi Wils & Moolenbeek, 1979
- Conus kobelti Löbbecke, 1882: synonym of Conus hyaena Hwass in Bruguière, 1792
- Conus kohni McLean & Nybakken, 1979: synonym of Conasprella kohni (McLean & Nybakken, 1979)
- Conus kongaensis da Motta, 1984: synonym of Conus wittigi Walls, 1977
- Conus korni G. Raybaudi Massilia, 1993: synonym of Pseudolilliconus korni (G. Raybaudi Massilia, 1993)
- Conus krabiensis da Motta, 1982: synonym of Conus generalis Linnaeus, 1767
- Conus kraussi Turton, 1932: synonym of Conus tinianus Hwass in Bruguière, 1792
- Conus kuiperi Moolenbeek, 2006: synonym of Pseudolilliconus kuiperi (Moolenbeek, 2006)
- Conus kurzi Petuch, 1974: synonym of Conus sazanka Shikama, 1970
- Conus lachrymosus Reeve, 1849: synonym of Conus boeticus Reeve, 1844
- Conus lacinulatus Kiener, 1850: synonym of Conus litoglyphus Hwass in Bruguière, 1792
- Conus lacteus Lamarck, 1810: synonym of Conus purissimus Filmer, 2011
- Conus laetus Gmelin, 1791: synonym of Conus granulatus Linnaeus, 1758
- Conus laevigatus G. B. Sowerby II, 1858: synonym of Conus namocanus Hwass in Bruguière, 1792
- Conus laevis Gmelin, 1791: synonym of Conus circumactus Iredale, 1929
- Conus lamarckii Kiener, 1847: synonym of Conus mercator Linnaeus, 1758
- Conus lani Crandall, 1979: synonym of Profundiconus lani (Crandall, 1979)
- Conus lapideus Holten, 1802: synonym of Conus zonatus Hwass in Bruguière, 1792
- Conus lapulapui da Motta & Martin, 1982: synonym of Conasprella eugrammata (Bartsch & Rehder, 1943)
- Conus latifasciatus G. B. Sowerby II, 1858: synonym of Conus janus Hwass in Bruguière, 1792
- Conus lautus Reeve, 1844: synonym of Conus mozambicus Hwass in Bruguière, 1792
- Conus lavendulus Bartsch, 1915: synonym of Conus tinianus Hwass in Bruguière, 1792
- Conus leaeneus Link, 1807: synonym of Conus ermineus Born, 1778
- Conus leehmani da Motta & Röckel, 1979: synonym of Conus gubernator Hwass in Bruguière, 1792
- Conus lemuriensis Wils & Delsaerdt, 1989: synonym of Conus milneedwardsi lemuriensis Wils & Delsaerdt, 1989
- Conus lenhilli Cargile, 1998: synonym of Conasprella lenhilli (Cargile, 1998)
- Conus lentiginosus Reeve, 1844: synonym of Conasprella lentiginosa (Reeve, 1844)
- Conus leoninus Hwass in Bruguière, 1792: synonym of Conus spurius Gmelin, 1791
- Conus leoninus [Lightfoot], 1786: synonym of Conus striatus Linnaeus, 1758
- Conus leoninus Gmelin, 1791: synonym of Conus pulcher [Lightfoot], 1786
- Conus leopardus Dillwyn, 1817: synonym of Conus vexillum Gmelin, 1791
- Conus leucostictus Gmelin, 1791: synonym of Conus regius Gmelin, 1791
- Conus lictor Boivin, 1864: synonym of Conus striatellus Link, 1807
- Conus lignarius Reeve, 1843: synonym of Conus furvus Reeve, 1843
- Conus lineatus Hwass in Bruguière, 1792: synonym of Conus striatellus Link, 1807
- Conus lineolatus Valenciennes, 1832: synonym of Conus princeps Linnaeus, 1758
- Conus liratus Reeve, 1844: synonym of Conus sphacelatus G. B. Sowerby I, 1833
- Conus listeri Renier, 1804: synonym of Conus ventricosus Gmelin, 1791
- Conus lizarum (G. Raybaudi Massilia & da Motta, 1992): synonym of Conasprella lizarum (Raybaudi Massilia & da Motta, 1992)
- Conus loebbeckeanus Weinkauff, 1873: synonym of Conus ferrugineus Hwass in Bruguière, 1792
- Conus lombei G. B. Sowerby III, 1881: synonym of Conasprella articulata (G. B. Sowerby II, 1873)
- Conus longurionis Kiener, 1845: synonym of Conasprella longurionis (Kiener, 1847)
- Conus lorenzi (Monnier & Limpalaër, 2012): synonym of Conasprella lorenzi Monnier & Limpalaër, 2012
- Conus loroisii Kiener, 1846: synonym of Conus buxeus loroisii Kiener, 1846
- Conus lovellreevei G. Raybaudi Massilia, 1993: synonym of Conus asiaticus lovellreevei G. Raybaudi Massilia, 1993
- Conus loveni Krauss, 1848: synonym of Conus tinianus Hwass in Bruguière, 1792
- Conus loyaltiensis Röckel, Richard, & Moolenbeek, 1995: synonym of Profundiconus loyaltiensis (Röckel & Moolenbeek, 1995)
- Conus lubeckianus Bernardi, 1861: synonym of Conus cardinalis Hwass in Bruguière, 1792
- Conus lucasi (Bozzetti, 2010): synonym of Conus chiapponorum Lorenz, 2004
- Conus lucidus Wood, 1828: synonym of Conasprella lucida (W. Wood, 1828)
- Conus lucirensis Paes Da Franca, 1957: synonym of Conus chytreus Tryon, 1884
- Conus luctificus Reeve, 1848: synonym of Conus fumigatus Hwass in Bruguière, 1792
- Conus luridus A. Adams, 1855: synonym of Conus taslei Kiener, 1850
- Conus luziensis Rolán, Röckel & Monteiro, 1983: synonym of Conus grahami luziensis Rolán, Röckel & Monteiro, 1983
- Conus luzonicus sensu G. B. Sowerby II, 1858: synonym of Conus purpurascens G. B. Sowerby I, 1833
- Conus luzonicus Hwass in Bruguière, 1792: synonym of Conus ermineus Born, 1778
- Conus macarae Bernardi, 1857: synonym of Conus voluminalis Reeve, 1843
- Conus macei Crosse, 1865: synonym of Conus mozambicus Hwass in Bruguière, 1792
- Conus mackintoshi (Petuch, 2013): synonym of Conasprella mindana (Hwass in Bruguière, 1792)
- Conus macleayana Tenison-Woods, 1877: synonym of Conasprella rutila (Menke, 1843)
- Conus maculatus G. B. Sowerby II, 1858: synonym of Conus anemone Lamarck, 1810
- Conus maculatus Perry, 1811: synonym of Conus marmoreus Linnaeus, 1758
- Conus maculatus Bosc, 1801: synonym of Conus sponsalis Hwass in Bruguière, 1792
- Conus maculospira Pilsbry, 1922: synonym of Conus inscriptus Reeve, 1843
- Conus maculosus G. B. Sowerby I, 1833: synonym of Conus anemone Lamarck, 1810
- Conus madurensis Hwass in Bruguière, 1792: synonym of Conus ventricosus Gmelin, 1791
- Conus magdalenae Kiener, 1847: synonym of Conus floccatus G. B. Sowerby I, 1841
- Conus magdalenensis Bartsch & Rehder, 1939: synonym of Conus regularis G. B. Sowerby I, 1833
- Conus mahogani] Reeve, 1843: synonym of Conasprella mahogani (Reeve, 1843)
- Conus maltzanianus Weinkauff, 1873: synonym of Conus frigidus Reeve, 1848
- Conus mamillaris Green, 1830: synonym of Conus daucus daucus Hwass in Bruguière, 1792 represented as Conus daucus Hwass in Bruguière, 1792
- Conus mappa Hwass in Bruguière, 1792: synonym of Conus mappa [Lightfoot], 1786
- Conus mappa Crosse, 1858: synonym of Conus eldredi Morrison, 1955
- Conus mariei Jousseaume, 1899: synonym of Conus thalassiarchus G. B. Sowerby I, 1834
- Conus marinae (Petuch & Myers, 2014): synonym of Conasprella marinae (Petuch & Myers, 2014)
- Conus marmoreus Perry, 1811: synonym of Conus monile Hwass in Bruguière, 1792
- Conus martinicanus Hwass in Bruguière, 1792: synonym of Conus cedonulli Linnaeus, 1767
- Conus masoni G. Nevill & H. Nevill, 1874: synonym of Conus caracteristicus Fischer von Waldheim, 1807
- Conus massemini (Monnier & Limpalaër, 2016): synonym of Conus daucus Hwass in Bruguière, 1792
- Conus mauricioi Coltro, 2004: synonym of Conus ziczac archetypus Crosse, 1865
- Conus mauritianus Hwass in Bruguière, 1792: synonym of Conasprella puncticulata (Hwass in Bruguière, 1792)
- Conus mayaguensis Nowell-Usticke, 1968: synonym of Conus cardinalis Hwass in Bruguière, 1792
- Conus mazei _{Deshayes, 1874}: synonym of Conasprella mazei (Deshayes, 1874)
- Conus mcgintyi Pilsbry, 1955: synonym of Conasprella mcgintyi (Pilsbry, 1955)
- Conus mediterraneus Hwass in Bruguière, 1792: synonym of Conus ventricosus Gmelin, 1791
- Conus melancholicus Lamarck, 1810: synonym of Conus magus Linnaeus, 1758
- Conus meleus G. B. Sowerby III, 1913: synonym of Conus boeticus Reeve, 1844
- Conus melinus Shikama, 1964: synonym of Conus mustelinus Hwass in Bruguière, 1792
- Conus memiae (Habe & Kosuge, 1970): synonym of Conasprella memiae (Habe & Kosuge, 1970)
- Conus merleti Mayissian, 1974: synonym of Conus moluccensis Küster, 1838
- Conus metcalfei Angas, 1877: synonym of Conus angasi Tryon, 1884
- Conus metcalfii Reeve, 1843: synonym of Conus magus Linnaeus, 1758
- Conus micarius Hedley, 1912: synonym of Mitromorpha micaria (Hedley, 1912)
- Conus mighelsi Kiener, 1847: synonym of Conus musicus Hwass in Bruguière, 1792
- Conus millepunctatus Lamarck, 1822: synonym of Conus leopardus (Röding, 1798)
- Conus mindanus Hwass in Bruguière, 1792: synonym of Conasprella mindana (Hwass in Bruguière, 1792)
- Conus minimus Linnaeus, 1758 (unaccepted, Nomenclaturally invalid name, placed on the Official Index of Invalid and Rejected Specific Names in Zoology (ICZN Opinion n°753))
- Conus minimus (Cossignani & Fiadeiro, 2015): synonym of Conus longilineus Röckel, Rolán & Monteiro, 1980
- Conus minutus Schröter, 1803: synonym of Conus jickelii Weinkauff, 1873
- Conus minutus Reeve, 1844: synonym of Conasprella pusio (Hwass in Bruguière, 1792)
- Conus mirmillo Crosse, 1865: synonym of Conus ferrugineus Hwass in Bruguière, 1792
- Conus miser Boivin, 1864: synonym of Conus ambiguus Reeve, 1844
- Conus mitraeformis Wood, 1828: synonym of Conus mitratus Hwass in Bruguière, 1792
- Conus modestus G. B. Sowerby I, 1833: synonym of Conus fulmen Reeve, 1843
- Conus molaerivus Dekkers, 2016: synonym of Pygmaeconus molaerivus (Dekkers, 2016)
- Conus monstrosus Küster, 1838: synonym of Conus araneosus [Lightfoot], 1786
- Conus morroensis (Cossignani & Fiadeiro, 2014): synonym of Conus diminutus Trovão & Rolán, 1986
- Conus moussoni Crosse, 1865: synonym of Conus balteatus G. B. Sowerby I, 1833
- Conus moylani Delsaerdt, 2000: synonym of Conus papuensis Coomans & Moolenbeek, 1982
- Conus multibandatus Bozzetti, 2017: synonym of Conus coronatus Gmelin, 1791
- Conus multicatenatus G. B. Sowerby II, 1865: synonym of Conus locumtenens Blumenbach, 1791
- Conus multilineatus G. B. Sowerby III, 1875: synonym of Conus furvus Reeve, 1843
- Conus muscosus Lamarck, 1810: synonym of Conus caracteristicus Fischer von Waldheim, 1807
- Conus musivum G. B. Sowerby I, 1833: synonym of Conus legatus Lamarck, 1810
- Conus musivus Trovão, 1975: synonym of Conus alexandrinus Kaicher, 1977
- Conus mutabilis Reeve, 1844: synonym of Conus hyaena Hwass in Bruguière, 1792
- Conus nahoniaraensis da Motta, 1986: synonym of Conus zebra Lamarck, 1810
- Conus narcissus Lamarck, 1810: synonym of Conus ermineus Born, 1778
- Conus nasui Ninomiya, 1974: synonym of Conasprella eugrammata (Bartsch & Rehder, 1943)
- Conus nebulosus Gmelin, 1791: synonym of Conus monachus Linnaeus, 1758
- Conus nebulosus Hwass in Bruguière, 1792: synonym of Conus regius Gmelin, 1791
- Conus neglectus A. Adams, 1855: synonym of Conus aplustre Reeve, 1843
- Conus neglectus Pease, 1861: synonym of Conus flavidus Lamarck, 1810
- Conus nelsonandradoi (Cossignani & Fiadeiro, 2015): synonym of Conus longilineus Röckel, Rolán & Monteiro, 1980
- Conus neoafricanus da Motta, 1991: synonym of Conus africanus Kiener, 1848
- Conus neobuxeus da Motta, 1991: synonym of Conus furvus Reeve, 1843
- Conus neoguttatus da Motta, 1991: synonym of Conus lineopunctatus Kaicher, 1977
- Conus neotorquatus da Motta, 1985: synonym of Profundiconus teramachii (Kuroda, 1956)
- Conus neptunoides E. A. Smith, 1880: synonym of Conus neptunus Reeve, 1843
- Conus nereis Petuch, 1979: synonym of Conasprella wakayamaensis (Kuroda, 1956)
- Conus nicobaricus Hwass in Bruguière, 1792: synonym of Conus araneosus nicobaricus Hwass in Bruguière, 1792
- Conus nicolii J. Wilson, 1831: synonym of Conus pulcher [Lightfoot], 1786
- Conus nigrescens G. B. Sowerby II, 1860: synonym of Conus bandanus Hwass in Bruguière, 1792
- Conus nigrostriatus Kosuge, 1979: synonym of Profundiconus lani (Crandall, 1979)
- Conus nipponicus da Motta, 1985: synonym of Conasprella spirofilis (Habe & Kosuge, 1970)
- Conus nisus Kiener, 1846: synonym of Conus amplus Röckel & Korn, 1992
- Conus nisus Dillwyn, 1817: synonym of Conus cinereus Hwass in Bruguière, 1792
- Conus nitidissimus Fenaux, 1942: synonym of Conus anemone Lamarck, 1810
- Conus nitidus Reeve, 1844: synonym of Conus boeticus Reeve, 1844
- Conus nivalis da Motta, 1985: synonym of Conus furvus Reeve, 1843
- Conus nivifer G. B. Sowerby I, 1833: synonym of Conus venulatus Hwass in Bruguière, 1792
- Conus nivosus Lamarck, 1810: synonym of Conus venulatus Hwass in Bruguière, 1792
- Conus nocturnus Hwass in Bruguière, 1792: synonym of Conus nocturnus [Lightfoot], 1786
- Conus nodiferus Kiener, 1847: synonym of Conasprella jaspidea pealii (Green, 1830)
- Conus norai da Motta & G. Raybaudi Massilia, 1992: synonym of Conus daucus Hwass in Bruguière, 1792
- Conus novaehollandiae A. Adams, 1855: synonym of Conus anemone novaehollandiae A. Adams, 1855
- Conus novemstriatus (Röding, 1798): synonym of Conus fulmineus Gmelin, 1791 (nomen dubium)
- Conus nubecula Gmelin, 1791: synonym of Conus bullatus Linnaeus, 1758
- Conus nullisecundus Nowell-Usticke, 1968: synonym of Conus cedonulli Linnaeus, 1767
- Conus obesus Hwass in Bruguière, 1792: synonym of Conus zeylanicus Gmelin, 1791
- Conus oblitus Reeve, 1849: synonym of Conus moreleti Crosse, 1858
- Conus obtusus Kiener, 1850: synonym of Conus variegatus Kiener, 1848
- Conus ochraceus Lamarck, 1810: synonym of Conus spurius Gmelin, 1791
- Conus oculatus Gmelin, 1791: synonym of Conus ermineus Born, 1778
- Conus ogum (Petuch & R. F. Myers, 2014): synonym of Conasprella ogum (Petuch & R. F. Myers, 2014)
- Conus okamotoi Kuroda & Itô, 1961: synonym of Conus lischkeanus Weinkauff, 1875
- Conus olangoensis Poppe & Tagaro, 2017: synonym of Conasprella olangoensis (Poppe & Tagaro, 2017)
- Conus oleiniki (Petuch, 2013): synonym of Conasprella jaspidea (Gmelin, 1791)
- Conus olgae Bacallado, Espinosa & Ortea, 2007: synonym of Conus havanensis Aguayo & Pérez Farfante, 1947
- Conus olgiatii Bozzetti, 2007: synonym of Conus balteatus G. B. Sowerby I, 1833
- Conus olivaceus Salis Marschlins, 1793: synonym of Conus ventricosus Gmelin, 1791
- Conus olivaceus Kiener, 1850: synonym of Conus ventricosus Gmelin, 1791
- Conus oltmansianus van Lennep, 1876: synonym of Conus gradatulus Weinkauff, 1875
- Conus omaicus Hwass in Bruguière, 1792: synonym of Conus thomae Gmelin, 1791
- Conus omanensis Moolenbeek & Coomans, 1993: synonym of Conus biraghii omanensis Moolenbeek & Coomans, 1993: synonym of Conasprella biraghii omanensis (Moolenbeek & Coomans, 1993)
- Conus optimus G. B. Sowerby III, 1913: synonym of Conus exiguus Lamarck, 1810
- Conus orbignyi Audouin, 1831: synonym of Conasprella orbignyi (Audouin, 1831)
- Conus orbitatus Reeve, 1843: synonym of Conus sulcatus Hwass in Bruguière, 1792
- Conus ornatus G. B. Sowerby I, 1833: synonym of Conus magellanicus Hwass in Bruguière, 1792
- Conus orri Ninomiya & da Motta, 1982: synonym of Conus mercator Linnaeus, 1758
- Conus otohimeae Kuroda & Itô, 1961: synonym of Conasprella otohimeae (Kuroda & Itô, 1961)
- Conus pacei Petuch, 1987: synonym of Conasprella pacei (Petuch, 1987)
- Conus pacificus Moolenbeek & Röckel, 1996: synonym of Profundiconus pacificus (Moolenbeek & Röckel, 1996)
- Conus padarosae (Cossignani & Fiadeiro, 2018): synonym of Conus antoniaensis (Cossignani & Fiadeiro, 2014)
- Conus pagodus Kiener, 1845: synonym of Conasprella pagoda (Kiener, 1845)
- Conus pallans Nardo, 1847: synonym of Conus ventricosus Gmelin, 1791
- Conus panniculus Lamarck, 1810: synonym of Conus textile Linnaeus, 1758
- Conus papalis Weinkauff, 1875: synonym of Mitromorpha papalis (Weinkauff, 1875)
- Conus papilionaceus Hwass in Bruguière, 1792: synonym of Conus pulcher [Lightfoot], 1786
- Conus papillaris A. Adams & Reeve, 1848: synonym of Conus gradatulus Weinkauff, 1875
- Conus papillaris Reeve, 1849: synonym of Conus gradatulus Weinkauff, 1875
- Conus papillaris G. B. Sowerby I, 1833: synonym of Conus pulcher [Lightfoot], 1786
- Conus papillosus Kiener, 1847: synonym of Conasprella puncticulata (Hwass in Bruguière, 1792)
- Conus paradiseus Shikama, 1977: synonym of Conus barthelemyi Bernardi, 1861
- Conus pardus Link, 1807: synonym of Conus leopardus (Röding, 1798)
- Conus particolor Perry, 1810: synonym of Conus aulicus Linnaeus, 1758
- Conus parvus Pease, 1868: synonym of Lovellona peaseana Finlay, 1927
- Conus parvus Gebauer, 1802: synonym of Conus coronatus Gmelin, 1791
- Conus pastinaca Lamarck, 1810: synonym of Conus daucus daucus Hwass in Bruguière, 1792 represented as Conus daucus Hwass in Bruguière, 1792
- Conus patamakanthini Delsaerdt, 1998: synonym of Conus australis Holten, 1802
- Conus patens G. B. Sowerby III, 1903: synonym of Conus gradatulus Weinkauff, 1875
- Conus patonganus da Motta, 1982: synonym of Conus omaria Hwass in Bruguière, 1792
- Conus paulina Kiener, 1850: synonym of Conus spurius Gmelin, 1791
- Conus paulucciae G. B. Sowerby III, 1887: synonym of Conus aureus paulucciae G. B. Sowerby III, 1887
- Conus pazii Bernardi, 1857: synonym of Conus fumigatus Hwass in Bruguière, 1792
- Conus pealii (Green, 1840): synonym of Conasprella jaspidea pealii (Green, 1830)
- Conus pedrofiadeiroi (Cossignani & Fiadeiro, 2015): synonym of Conus borgesi Trovão, 1979
- Conus pennasilicorum Bozzetti, 2017: synonym of Conus alconnelli da Motta, 1986
- Conus pepeiu Moolenbeek, Zandbergen & Bouchet, 2008: synonym of Conasprella pepeiu (Moolenbeek, Zandbergen & Bouchet, 2008)
- Conus peplum G. B. Sowerby II, 1857: synonym of Conus araneosus [Lightfoot], 1786
- Conus perplexus G. B. Sowerby II, 1857: synonym of Conasprella perplexa (G. B. Sowerby II, 1857)
- Conus perprotractus Petuch, 1987: synonym of Conus sanderi Wils & Moolenbeek, 1979
- Conus perryae Clench, 1942: synonym of Conus ermineus Born, 1778
- Conus petricosus Azuma, 1961: synonym of Conasprella sieboldii (Reeve, 1848)
- Conus pfluegeri Petuch, 2003: synonym of Conasprella pfluegeri (Petuch, 2003)
- Conus phegeus Nardo, 1847: synonym of Conus ventricosus Gmelin, 1791
- Conus phlogopus Tomlin, 1937: synonym of Conus spurius lorenzianus Dillwyn, 1817
- Conus phuketensis da Motta, 1978: synonym of Conus pretiosus G. Nevill & H. Nevill, 1874
- Conus pigmentatus A. Adams & Reeve, 1848: synonym of Conus balteatus G. B. Sowerby I, 1833
- Conus pilkeyi Petuch, 1974: synonym of Conus ochroleucus tmetus Tomlin, 1937
- Conus pineaui Pin & Leung Tack, 1995: synonym of Conus guinaicus Hwass in Bruguière, 1792
- Conus pinedensis (Cossignani & Fiadeiro, 2017): synonym of Conus damottai Trovão, 1979
- Conus piperatus Reeve, 1844: synonym of Conus erythraeensis Reeve, 1843
- Conus piperatus Dillwyn, 1817: synonym of Conus biliosus (Röding, 1798)
- Conus planaxis Deshayes, 1863: synonym of Conus maldivus Hwass in Bruguière, 1792
- Conus planicostatus G. B. Sowerby I, 1833: synonym of Conasprella orbignyi (Audouin, 1831)
- Conus planiliratus G. B. Sowerby III, 1870: synonym of Conus inscriptus Reeve, 1843
- Conus plebejus Link, 1807: synonym of Conus lividus Hwass in Bruguière, 1792
- Conus plumbeus Reeve, 1844: synonym of Conus exiguus Lamarck, 1810
- Conus poehlianus G. B. Sowerby III, 1887: synonym of Conus consors G. B. Sowerby I, 1833
- Conus politus Weinkauff, 1875: synonym of Conus cinereus Hwass in Bruguière, 1792
- Conus polyglotta Weinkauff, 1874: synonym of Conus eburneus Hwass in Bruguière, 1792
- Conus polygrammus Tomlin, 1937: synonym of Conus furvus Reeve, 1843
- Conus polyzonias Gmelin, 1791: synonym of Conus planorbis Born, 1778
- Conus pomponeti (Petuch & Myers, 2014): synonym of Conasprella pomponeti (Petuch & Myers, 2014)
- Conus pontificalis Lamarck, 1810: synonym of Conus dorreensis Péron, 1807
- Conus poppei Elsen, 1983: synonym of Conus crotchii Reeve, 1849
- Conus poremskii (Petuch & R. F. Myers, 2014): synonym of Conasprella poremskii (Petuch & R. F. Myers, 2014)
- Conus portoricanus Hwass in Bruguière, 1792: synonym of Conus ermineus Born, 1778
- Conus postdiluvianus Risso, 1826: synonym of Conus ventricosus Gmelin, 1791
- Conus potusmarumai Kosuge, 1980: synonym of Conus pergrandis (Iredale, 1937)
- Conus praeclarus Fenaux, 1942: synonym of Conus planorbis Born, 1778
- Conus praefectus Hwass in Bruguière, 1792: synonym of Conus ochroleucus Gmelin, 1791
- Conus praelatus Hwass in Bruguière, 1792: synonym of Conus pennaceus Born, 1778
- Conus praetextus Reeve, 1848: synonym of Conus encaustus Kiener, 1845
- Conus prevosti G. B. Sowerby III, 1881: synonym of Conus lienardi Bernardi & Crosse, 1861
- Conus primula Reeve, 1849: synonym of Conus lividus Hwass in Bruguière, 1792
- Conus priscai (Bozzetti, 2012): synonym of Conus archiepiscopus Hwass in Bruguière, 1792
- Conus profundorum (Kuroda, 1956): synonym of Profundiconus profundorum (Kuroda, 1956)
- Conus prometheus Hwass in Bruguière, 1792: synonym of Conus pulcher [Lightfoot], 1786
- Conus propinquus E. A. Smith, 1877: synonym of Conus balteatus G. B. Sowerby I, 1833
- Conus proteus Hwass in Bruguière, 1792: synonym of Conus spurius Gmelin, 1791
- Conus prytanis G. B. Sowerby III, 1882: synonym of Conus diadema G. B. Sowerby I, 1834
- Conus pseudoaustini Nowell-Usticke, 1968: synonym of Conasprella bajanensis (Nowell-Usticke, 1968)
- Conus pseudocoelinae Delsaerdt, 1989: synonym of Conus coelinae Crosse, 1858
- Conus pseudojaspideus Nowell-Usticke, 1968: synonym of Conasprella jaspidea pealii (Green, 1830)
- Conus pseudokimioi da Motta & Martin, 1982: synonym of Conasprella pseudokimioi (da Motta & Martin, 1982)
- Conus pseudomarmoreus Crosse, 1875: synonym of Conus marmoreus Linnaeus, 1758
- Conus pseudorbignyi Röckel & Lan, 1981: synonym of Conasprella pseudorbignyi (Röckel & Lan, 1981)
- Conus pulchellus Swainson, 1822: synonym of Conus circumactus Iredale, 1929
- Conus pulchellus G. B. Sowerby I, 1834: synonym of Conus varius Linnaeus, 1758
- Conus pulcher A. Adams, 1855: synonym of Conus proximus G. B. Sowerby II, 1860
- Conus pulcherrimus Brazier, 1894: synonym of Conus excelsus G. B. Sowerby III, 1908
- Conus pulchrelineatus Hopwood, 1921: synonym of Conus striatellus Link, 1807
- Conus punctatus Gmelin, 1791: synonym of Conus augur [Lightfoot], 1786
- Conus punctatus Hwass in Bruguière, 1792: synonym of Conus biliosus (Röding, 1798)
- Conus puncticulatus Hwass in Bruguière, 1792: synonym of Conasprella puncticulata (Hwass in Bruguière, 1792)
- Conus puncturatus Hwass in Bruguière, 1792: synonym of Conus sponsalis Hwass in Bruguière, 1792
- Conus purus Pease, 1863: synonym of Conus pennaceus Born, 1778
- Conus pusillus Reeve, 1843: synonym of Conus parvatus Walls, 1979
- Conus pusillus Gould, 1853: synonym of Conus nux Broderip, 1833
- Conus pusillus G. B. Sowerby II, 1857: synonym of Conus parvatus Walls, 1979
- Conus pusillus Lamarck, 1810: synonym of Conasprella pusio (Hwass in Bruguière, 1792)
- Conus pusio G. B. Sowerby I, 1834: synonym of Conus melvilli G. B. Sowerby III, 1879
- Conus pusio Hwass in Bruguière, 1792: synonym of Conasprella pusio (Hwass in Bruguière, 1792)
- Conus pygmaeus Reeve, 1844: synonym of Conasprella puncticulata (Hwass in Bruguière, 1792)
- Conus pyramidalis Lamarck, 1810: synonym of Conus canonicus Hwass in Bruguière, 1792
- Conus pyriformis Reeve, 1843: synonym of Conus patricius Hinds, 1843
- Conus quadratomaculatus G. B. Sowerby II, 1866: synonym of Conus erythraeensis Reeve, 1843
- Conus quadratus Perry, 1811: synonym of Conus ebraeus Linnaeus, 1758
- Conus quaestor Lamarck, 1810: synonym of Conus venulatus Hwass in Bruguière, 1792
- Conus quasimagnificus da Motta, 1982: synonym of Conus pennaceus Born, 1778
- Conus queketti E. A. Smith, 1906: synonym of Conus imperialis queketti E. A. Smith, 1906
- Conus quercinus Hwass in Bruguière, 1792: synonym of Conus quercinus [Lightfoot], 1786
- Conus racemosus G. B. Sowerby II, 1874: synonym of Conus pennaceus Born, 1778
- Conus rachelae Petuch, 1988: synonym of Conasprella rachelae (Petuch, 1988)
- Conus rainesae McGinty, 1953: synonym of Conasprella rainesae (McGinty, 1953)
- Conus ranunculus Hwass in Bruguière, 1792: synonym of Conus achatinus Gmelin, 1791
- Conus raoulensis Powell, 1958: synonym of Conasprella raoulensis (Powell, 1958)
- Conus raphanus Hwass in Bruguière, 1792: synonym of Conus magus Linnaeus, 1758
- Conus rarimaculatus G. B. Sowerby II, 1870: synonym of Conasprella sieboldii (Reeve, 1848)
- Conus ravus Gould, 1853: synonym of Californiconus californicus (Reeve, 1844)
- Conus reevei Kiener, 1845: synonym of Conus vittatus Hwass in Bruguière, 1792
- Conus reflectus G. B. Sowerby III, 1877: synonym of Conus catus Hwass in Bruguière, 1792
- Conus reflexus G. B. Sowerby III, 1887: synonym of Conus catus Hwass in Bruguière, 1792
- Conus regalitatis G. B. Sowerby I, 1834: synonym of Conus purpurascens G. B. Sowerby I, 1833
- Conus regius Hwass in Bruguière, 1792: synonym of Conus princeps Linnaeus, 1758
- Conus regus [sic]: synonym of Conus princeps Linnaeus, 1758
- Conus remo Brazier, 1898: synonym of Conus anemone Lamarck, 1810
- Conus reteaureum Perry, 1811: synonym of Conus textile Linnaeus, 1758
- Conus reticularis Bory de Saint Vincent, 1827: synonym of Conus mercator Linnaeus, 1758
- Conus reticulatus Perry, 1811: synonym of Conus araneosus [Lightfoot], 1786
- Conus reticulatus Born, 1778: synonym of Conus mercator Linnaeus, 1758
- Conus reticulatus G. B. Sowerby I, 1834: synonym of Conasprella lucida (W. Wood, 1828)
- Conus rhododendron Jay, 1839: synonym of Conus adamsonii Broderip, 1836
- Conus richardi Fenaux, 1942: synonym of Conus fumigatus Hwass in Bruguière, 1792
- Conus rikae (Petuch & Berschauer, 2018): synonym of Conus mercator Linnaeus, 1758
- Conus riosi Petuch, 1986: synonym of Conus daucus riosi Petuch, 1986
- Conus rivularius Reeve, 1849: synonym of Conus boeticus Reeve, 1844
- Conus roatanensis Petuch & Sargent, 2011: synonym of Conasprella roatanensis (Petuch & Sargent, 2011)
- Conus roberti Richard, 2009: synonym of Conasprella roberti (Richard, 2009)
- Conus robillardi Bernardi, 1858: synonym of Conus vexillum Gmelin, 1791
- Conus rogmartini da Motta, 1982: synonym of Conasprella otohimeae (Kuroda & Itô, 1961)
- Conus rollandi Bernardi, 1860: synonym of Conus magus Linnaeus, 1758
- Conus roosevelti Bartsch & Rehder, 1939: synonym of Conus tiaratus G. B. Sowerby I, 1833
- Conus roquensis (Cossignani & Fiadeiro, 2015): synonym of Conus damottai Trovão, 1979
- Conus rosaceus Kiener, 1849: synonym of Conus iodostoma Reeve, 1843
- Conus rosaceus Dillwyn, 1817: synonym of Conus tinianus Hwass in Bruguière, 1792
- Conus rosaceus G. B. Sowerby I, 1834: synonym of Conasprella mindana (Hwass in Bruguière, 1792)
- Conus roseotinctus G. B. Sowerby II, 1866: synonym of Conus anemone Lamarck, 1810
- Conus roseus Fischer von Waldheim, 1807: synonym of Conus granulatus Linnaeus, 1758
- Conus roseus Lamarck, 1810: synonym of Conus biliosus (Röding, 1798)
- Conus rosiae (Monnier, Batifoix & Limpalaër, 2018): synonym of Conus behelokensis Lauer, 1989
- Conus rossiteri Brazier, 1870: synonym of Conus papilliferus G. B. Sowerby I, 1834
- Conus rubescens Bonnet, 1864: synonym of Conus canonicus Hwass in Bruguière, 1792
- Conus rubiginosus Hwass in Bruguière, 1792: synonym of Conus pennaceus Born, 1778
- Conus rubropennatus da Motta, 1982: synonym of Conus pennaceus Born, 1778
- Conus rudiae Magnotte, 1971: synonym of Conus patae Abbott, 1971
- Conus rudis Weinkauff, 1873: synonym of Conus ermineus Born, 1778
- Conus ruppellii Reeve, 1848: synonym of Conus boeticus Reeve, 1844
- Conus rusticus Linnaeus, 1758 (unaccepted, Nomenclaturally invalid name, placed on the Official Index of Invalid and Rejected Specific Names in Zoology (ICZN Opinion n°753))
- Conus rusticus Poli, 1826: synonym of Conus ventricosus Gmelin, 1791
- Conus rutilus Menke, 1843: synonym of Conasprella rutila (Menke, 1843)
- Conus saecularis Melvill, 1898: synonym of Conasprella saecularis (Melvill, 1898)
- Conus sagarinoi Fenzan, 2004: synonym of Conus terryni Tenorio & Poppe, 2004
- Conus sagei Korn & G. Raybaudi Massilia, 1993: synonym of Conasprella sagei (Korn & G. Raybaudi Massilia, 1993)
- Conus sagittatus G. B. Sowerby II, 1865: synonym of Conus lemniscatus Reeve, 1849
- Conus sagittiferus G. B. Sowerby II, 1866: synonym of Conus lemniscatus Reeve, 1849
- Conus samiae da Motta, 1982: synonym of Conus sulcatus Hwass in Bruguière, 1792
- Conus sanctaemarthae Vink, 1977: synonym of Conus granarius Kiener, 1847
- Conus sanderi Wils & Moolenbeek, 1979: synonym of Conus villepinii P. Fischer & Bernardi, 1857
- Conus sanguinolentus Reeve, 1849: synonym of Conus daucus Hwass in Bruguière, 1792
- Conus sapphirostoma Weinkauff, 1874: synonym of Conus biliosus (Röding, 1798)
- Conus sargenti (Petuch, 2013): synonym of Conasprella sargenti (Petuch, 2013)
- Conus sauros Garcia, 2006: synonym of Conasprella sauros (Garcia, 2006)
- Conus sazanka Shikama, 1970: synonym of Conus martensi E. A. Smith, 1884
- Conus scaber Kiener, 1847: synonym of Conus miliaris Hwass in Bruguière, 1792
- Conus scaber Link, 1807: synonym of Conasprella puncticulata (Hwass in Bruguière, 1792)
- Conus scabriusculus Dillwyn, 1817: synonym of Conus coffeae Gmelin, 1791
- Conus scariphus (Dall, 1910): synonym of Conasprella scaripha (Dall, 1910)
- Conus schech Weinkauff, 1873: synonym of Conus locumtenens Blumenbach, 1791
- Conus schepmani Fulton, 1936: synonym of Conus comatosa Pilsbry, 1904: synonym of Conasprella comatosa (Pilsbry, 1904)
- Conus schirrmeisteri Coltro, 2004: synonym of Conasprella iansa (Petuch, 1979)
- Conus scitulus Reeve, 1849: synonym of Conus algoensis scitulus Reeve, 1849
- Conus scopulicola (Okutani, 1972): synonym of Profundiconus scopulicola Okutani, 1972
- Conus scriptus G. B. Sowerby II, 1858: synonym of Conus textile vaulberti Lorenz, 2012
- Conus secutor Crosse, 1865: synonym of Conus tinianus Hwass in Bruguière, 1792
- Conus segravei Gatliff, 1891: synonym of Conus clarus E. A. Smith, 1881
- Conus selectus A. Adams, 1855: synonym of Conus monilifer Broderip, 1833
- Conus selenae van Mol, Tursch & Kempf, 1967: synonym of Artemidiconus selenae (van Mol, Tursch & Kempf, 1967)
- Conus semisulcatus G. B. Sowerby II, 1870: synonym of Conus capreolus Röckel, 1985
- Conus semivelatus G. B. Sowerby III, 1882: synonym of Conus rattus Hwass in Bruguière, 1792
- Conus senator Linnaeus, 1758 (unaccepted, Nomenclaturally invalid name, placed on the Official Index of Invalid and Rejected Specific Names in Zoology (ICZN Opinion n°753))
- Conus seychellensis G. Nevill & H. Nevill, 1874: synonym of Conus litoglyphus Hwass in Bruguière, 1792
- Conus siamensis Hwass in Bruguière, 1792: synonym of Conus pulcher siamensis Hwass in Bruguière, 1792
- Conus siculus Delle Chiaje, 1828: synonym of Conus ventricosus Gmelin, 1791
- Conus sieboldii Reeve, 1848: synonym of Conasprella sieboldii (Reeve, 1848)
- Conus signae Bartsch, 1937: synonym of Conus virgatus Reeve, 1849
- Conus signifer Crosse, 1865: synonym of Conus magus Linnaeus, 1758
- Conus simonei (Petuch & R. F. Myers, 2014): synonym of Conasprella simonei (Petuch & R. F. Myers, 2014)
- Conus simonis Bozzetti, 2010: synonym of Conus striolatus Kiener, 1848
- Conus simplex G. B. Sowerby II, 1858: synonym of Conus algoensis simplex G. B. Sowerby II, 1858
- Conus sindon Reeve, 1844: synonym of Conus omaria Hwass in Bruguière, 1792
- Conus sinensis G. B. Sowerby I, 1841: synonym of Conus praecellens A. Adams, 1855
- Conus sirventi Fenaux, 1943: synonym of Conus textile Linnaeus, 1758
- Conus skinneri da Motta, 1982: synonym of Conus nobilis skinneri da Motta, 1982
- Conus smirna Bartsch & Rehder, 1943: synonym of Profundiconus smirna (Bartsch & Rehder, 1943)
- Conus smithi Angas, 1877: synonym of Conasprella rutila (Menke, 1843)
- Conus soaresi Trovão, 1978: synonym of Conus cloveri Walls, 1978
- Conus solandri Broderip & G. B. Sowerby I, 1830: synonym of Conus coccineus Gmelin, 1791
- Conus solidus G. B. Sowerby I, 1841: synonym of Conus retifer Menke, 1829
- Conus somalicus (Bozzetti, 2013): synonym of Conasprella somalica (Bozzetti, 2013)
- Conus sophiae Brazier, 1875: synonym of Conus ferrugineus Hwass in Bruguière, 1792
- Conus sorenseni Sander, 1982: synonym of Conus sanderi Wils & Moolenbeek, 1979
- Conus sowerbii Reeve, 1849: synonym of Conus praecellens A. Adams, 1855
- Conus sowerbyi G. B. Sowerby II, 1857: synonym of Conus praecellens A. Adams, 1855
- Conus sozoni Bartsch, 1939: synonym of Conasprella delessertii (Récluz, 1843)
- Conus speciosissimus Reeve, 1848: synonym of Conus magellanicus Hwass in Bruguière, 1792
- Conus speciosus G. B. Sowerby II, 1857: synonym of Conus cardinalis Hwass in Bruguière, 1792
- Conus spectabilis A. Adams, 1855: synonym of Conus artoptus G. B. Sowerby I, 1833
- Conus spiculum Reeve, 1849: synonym of Conus generalis Linnaeus, 1767
- Conus spirofilis Habe & Kosuge, 1970: synonym of Conasprella spirofilis (Habe & Kosuge, 1970)
- Conus spirogloxus Deshayes, 1863: synonym of Conus maldivus Hwass in Bruguière, 1792
- Conus spurius (Röding, 1798): synonym of Conus regius Gmelin, 1791
- Conus stainforthii Reeve, 1843: synonym of Conus moluccensis Küster, 1838
- Conus stearnsianus (Raymond, 1904): synonym of Megasurcula stearnsiana (Raymond, 1904)
- Conus stearnsii Conrad, 1869: synonym of Conasprella stearnsii (Conrad, 1869)
- Conus stellatus Kiener, 1847: synonym of Conus pennaceus Born, 1778
- † Conus stenostoma G. B. Sowerby I, 1850: synonym of † Conasprella stenostoma (G. B. Sowerby I, 1850)
- Conus stercutius Nardo, 1847: synonym of Conus ventricosus Gmelin, 1791
- Conus sticticus A. Adams, 1855: synonym of Conasprella jaspidea pealii (Green, 1830)
- Conus stigmaticus A. Adams, 1855: synonym of Conus collisus Reeve, 1849
- Conus stillatus Reeve, 1849: synonym of Conus spectrum Linnaeus, 1758
- Conus stocki Coomans & Moolenbeek, 1990: synonym of Conasprella stocki (Coomans & Moolenbeek, 1990)
- Conus strigatus Hwass in Bruguière, 1792: synonym of Conus australis Holten, 1802
- Conus subacutus Fenaux, 1942: synonym of Conus amadis Gmelin, 1791
- Conus subcapitaneus Link, 1807: synonym of Conus litoglyphus Hwass in Bruguière, 1792
- Conus subcarinatus G. B. Sowerby II, 1865: synonym of Conus malacanus Hwass in Bruguière, 1792
- Conus subfloridus da Motta, 1985: synonym of Conus striatus striatus Linnaeus, 1758
- Conus submediterraneus Locard, 1886: synonym of Conus ventricosus Gmelin, 1791
- Conus subroseus Röckel & Korn, 1992: synonym of Conus lischkeanus Weinkauff, 1875
- Conus substitutus Link, 1807: synonym of Conus locumtenens Blumenbach, 1791
- Conus succinctus A. Adams, 1855: synonym of Conus infrenatus Reeve, 1848
- Conus suffusus G. B. Sowerby II, 1870: synonym of Conus marmoreus Linnaeus, 1758
- Conus sugillatus Reeve, 1844: synonym of Conus muriculatus G. B. Sowerby I, 1833
- Conus sulcatus Link, 1807: synonym of Conasprella jaspidea (Gmelin, 1791)
- Conus sulcatus Mühlfeld, 1816: synonym of Conasprella jaspidea pealii (Green, 1830)
- Conus sulciferus A. Adams, 1855: synonym of Conus ochroleucus tmetus Tomlin, 1937
- Conus sulphuratus Kiener, 1846: synonym of Conus vexillum Gmelin, 1791
- Conus suluensis Shikama, 1979: synonym of Conus tribblei Walls, 1977
- Conus sumatrensis Hwass in Bruguière, 1792: synonym of Conus vexillum Gmelin, 1791
- Conus superscriptus G. B. Sowerby III, 1877: synonym of Conus iodostoma Reeve, 1843
- Conus superstriatus G. B. Sowerby II, 1858: synonym of Conus anemone Lamarck, 1810
- Conus surinamensis Hwass in Bruguière, 1792: synonym of Conus mappa [Lightfoot], 1786
- Conus sutoreanus Weinkauff, 1875: synonym of Conus gubernator Hwass in Bruguière, 1792
- Conus suzannae van Rossum, 1990: synonym of Conus textile Linnaeus, 1758
- Conus syriacus G. B. Sowerby I, 1833: synonym of Conus regularis G. B. Sowerby I, 1833
- Conus tahitiensis Dautzenberg, 1932: synonym of Conus rattus Hwass in Bruguière, 1792
- Conus taitensis Hwass in Bruguière, 1792: synonym of Conus rattus Hwass in Bruguière, 1792
- Conus tamikoae Shikama, 1973: synonym of Conus kinoshitai (Kuroda, 1956)
- Conus tarafensis (Cossignani & Fiadeiro, 2018): synonym of Conus fuscoflavus Röckel, Rolán & Monteiro, 1980
- Conus tamsianus Dunker, 1853: synonym of Conus aemulus Reeve, 1844
- Conus tarava Rabiller & Richard, 2014: synonym of Profundiconus tarava (Rabiller & Richard, 2014): synonym of Profundiconus teramachii (Kuroda, 1956)
- Conus taslei Kiener, 1845: synonym of Conus guinaicus Hwass in Bruguière, 1792
- Conus tasmaniae G. B. Sowerby II, 1866: synonym of Conus magus Linnaeus, 1758
- Conus tasmanicus Tenison-Woods, 1876: synonym of Conasprella rutila (Menke, 1843)
- Conus taylorianus E. A. Smith, 1880: synonym of Conus exiguus Lamarck, 1810
- Conus tegulatus G. B. Sowerby II, 1870: synonym of Conus inscriptus Reeve, 1843
- Conus tendineus Hwass in Bruguière, 1792: synonym of Conus violaceus Gmelin, 1791
- Conus tenellus Holten, 1802: synonym of Conus nimbosus Hwass in Bruguière, 1792
- Conus tenellus Dillwyn, 1817: synonym of Conus nimbosus Hwass in Bruguière, 1792
- Conus tenuis G. B. Sowerby I, 1833: synonym of Conus tinianus Hwass in Bruguière, 1792
- Conus tenuis G. B. Sowerby II, 1857: synonym of Conus floridulus A. Adams & Reeve, 1848
- Conus tenuisulcatus G. B. Sowerby II, 1873: synonym of Conus balteatus G. B. Sowerby I, 1833
- Conus teramachii (Kuroda, 1956): synonym of Profundiconus teramachii (Kuroda, 1956)
- Conus terebellum Linnaeus, 1758: synonym of Terebellum terebellum (Linnaeus, 1758)
- Conus terebellum (Röding, 1798): synonym of Conus circumcisus Born, 1778
- Conus terebellum Gmelin, 1791: synonym of Conus terebra Born, 1778
- Conus terminus Lamarck, 1822: synonym of Conus gubernator Hwass in Bruguière, 1792
- Conus testudinarius Hwass in Bruguière, 1792: synonym of Conus ermineus Born, 1778
- Conus tevesi Trovão, 1978: synonym of Conus alexandrinus Kaicher, 1977
- Conus textilinus Kiener, 1847: synonym of Conus textile archiepiscopus Hwass in Bruguière, 1792: synonym of Conus textile Linnaeus, 1758
- Conus thailandis da Motta, 1978: synonym of Conus crocatus thailandis da Motta, 1978
- Conus thomasi G. B. Sowerby III, 1881: synonym of Conus terebra Born, 1778
- Conus thuscus Nardo, 1847: synonym of Conus ventricosus Gmelin, 1791
- Conus tigrinus G. B. Sowerby II, 1858: synonym of Conus textile Linnaeus, 1758
- Conus tiki Moolenbeek, Zandbergen & Bouchet, 2008: synonym of Conasprella tiki (Moolenbeek, Zandbergen & Bouchet, 2008)
- Conus tirardi Röckel & Moolenbeek, 1996: synonym of Conasprella tirardi (Röckel & Moolenbeek, 1996)
- Conus tornatus G. B. Sowerby I, 1833: synonym of Conasprella tornata (G. B. Sowerby I, 1833)
- Conus torquatus Martens, 1901: synonym of Profundiconus teramachii (Kuroda, 1956)
- Conus tosaensis Shikama, 1970: synonym of Conasprella articulata (G. B. Sowerby II, 1873)
- Conus traillii A. Adams, 1855: synonym of Pygmaeconus traillii (A. Adams, 1855)
- Conus traversianus E. A. Smith, 1875: synonym of Conasprella traversiana (E. A. Smith, 1875)
- Conus tremperianus (Dall, 1911): synonym of Megasurcula carpenteriana (Gabb, 1865)
- Conus tribunus Crosse, 1865: synonym of Conus hyaena Hwass in Bruguière, 1792
- Conus tribunus Gmelin, 1791: synonym of Conasprella centurio (Born, 1778)
- Conus trinitarius Hwass in Bruguière, 1792: synonym of Conus mappa trinitarius Hwass in Bruguière, 1792
- Conus tropicensis Coomans & Filmer, 1985: synonym of Conus lischkeanus Weinkauff, 1875
- Conus trunculus Monterosato, 1899: synonym of Conus ventricosus Gmelin, 1791
- † Conus tryoni Heilprin, 1887: synonym of † Contraconus tryoni (Heilprin, 1887)
- Conus tuberculosus Tomlin, 1938: synonym of Profundiconus tuberculosus (Tomlin, 1937)
- Conus turbinatus G. B. Sowerby II, 1858: synonym of Conus suturatus Reeve, 1844
- Conus turriculatus G. B. Sowerby II, 1866: synonym of Conus acutangulus Lamarck, 1810
- Conus turritinus da Motta, 1985: synonym of Conus furvus Reeve, 1843
- Conus turritus G. B. Sowerby II, 1870: synonym of Conus gradatulus Weinkauff, 1875
- Conus turschi da Motta, 1985: synonym of Conus consors G. B. Sowerby I, 1833
- Conus undatus Kiener, 1847: synonym of Conus spurius lorenzianus Dillwyn, 1817
- Conus undulatus G. B. Sowerby II, 1858: synonym of Conus sulcatus Hwass in Bruguière, 1792
- Conus undulatus [Lightfoot], 1786: synonym of Conus textile Linnaeus, 1758
- Conus unicolor G. B. Sowerby I, 1834: synonym of Conus hyaena concolor G. B. Sowerby II, 1841
- Conus unicolor G. B. Sowerby I, 1833: synonym of Conus circumcisus Born, 1778
- Conus ustickei J. P. Miller in Nowell-Usticke, 1959: synonym of Conus attenuatus Reeve, 1844
- Conus ustulatus Reeve, 1844: synonym of Conus magus Linnaeus, 1758
- Conus vanhyningi (Rehder, 1944): synonym of Conasprella vanhyningi (Rehder, 1944)
- Conus varandinhensis (Cossignani & Fiadeiro, 2017): synonym of Conus boavistensis Rolán & F. Fernandes, 1990
- Conus vaubani Röckel, Richard & Moolenbeek, 1995: synonym of Profundiconus vaubani (Röckel & Moolenbeek, 1995)
- Conus vayssetianus Crosse, 1872: synonym of Conus exiguus Lamarck, 1810
- Conus veillardi da Motta, 1990: synonym of Conus gubernator Hwass in Bruguière, 1792
- Conus vermiculatus Lamarck, 1822: synonym of Conus chaldaeus (Röding, 1798)
- Conus verreauxii Kiener, 1846: synonym of Conus spectrum Linnaeus, 1758
- Conus verriculum Reeve, 1843: synonym of Conus textile Linnaeus, 1758
- Conus verrucosus Hwass in Bruguière, 1792: synonym of Conus jaspideus pealii Green, 1830: synonym of Conasprella jaspidea pealii (Green, 1830)
- Conus verulosus Hwass in Bruguière, 1792: synonym of Conus granulatus Linnaeus, 1758
- Conus vespertinus G. B. Sowerby I, 1825: synonym of Conus timorensis Hwass in Bruguière, 1792
- Conus viaderi Fenaux, 1942: synonym of Conus locumtenens Blumenbach, 1791
- Conus vicarius Linnaeus, 1767: synonym of Conus ammiralis Linnaeus, 1758
- Conus vicarius (Röding, 1798): synonym of Conus locumtenens Blumenbach, 1791
- Conus vicarius Lamarck, 1810: synonym of Conus ammiralis Linnaeus, 1758
- Conus vicdani Kosuge, 1980: synonym of Conus sulcocastaneus Kosuge, 1981
- Conus vikingorum Petuch, 1993: synonym of Conus daucus Hwass in Bruguière, 1792
- Conus vimineus Reeve, 1849: synonym of Conasprella viminea (Reeve, 1849)
- Conus vinctus A. Adams, 1855: synonym of Conus monachus Linnaeus, 1758
- Conus violaceus Reeve, 1844: synonym of Conus viola Cernohorsky, 1977
- Conus violaceus Link, 1807: synonym of Conus glans Hwass in Bruguière, 1792
- Conus viperinus Lauer, 1986: synonym of Conus omaria Hwass in Bruguière, 1792
- Conus virgineus Link, 1807: synonym of Conus coronatus Gmelin, 1791
- Conus viridis G. B. Sowerby II, 1857: synonym of Conus rattus Hwass in Bruguière, 1792
- Conus viridulus Lamarck, 1810: synonym of Conus imperialis Linnaeus, 1758
- Conus visseri Delsaerdt, 1990: synonym of Pygmaeconus visseri (Delsaerdt, 1990)
- Conus vitulinus Hwass in Bruguière, 1792: synonym of Conus planorbis Born, 1778
- Conus vulpinus Hwass in Bruguière, 1792: synonym of Conus planorbis Born, 1778
- Conus vulpinus Schubert & Wagner, 1829: synonym of Conus planorbis Born, 1778
- Conus wakayamaensis (Kuroda, 1956): synonym of Conasprella wakayamaensis (Kuroda, 1956)
- Conus wallacei (Lorenz & Morrison, 2004): synonym of Pygmaeconus wallacei (Lorenz & Morrison, 2004)
- Conus waterhouseae Brazier, 1896: synonym of Conus distans Hwass in Bruguière, 1792
- Conus weinkauffii Löbbecke, 1882: synonym of Conus spurius Gmelin, 1791
- Conus wendrosi (Tenorio & Afonso, 2013): synonym of Conasprella wendrosi (Tenorio & Afonso, 2013)
- Conus whiteheadae da Motta, 1985: synonym of Conus sugimotonis Kuroda, 1928
- Conus wilmeri G. B. Sowerby III, 1882: synonym of Conus acutangulus Lamarck, 1810
- Conus wistaria Shikama, 1970: synonym of Conus fulmen Reeve, 1843
- Conus wolof (Petuch & Berschauer, 2018): synonym of Conus guinaicus Hwass in Bruguière, 1792
- Conus woolseyi M. Smith, 1946: synonym of Conasprella centurio (Born, 1778)
- Conus worcesteri Brazier, 1891: synonym of Conus magus Linnaeus, 1758
- Conus worki Petuch, 1998: synonym of Conus daucus riosi Petuch, 1986
- Conus ximenes Gray, 1839: synonym of Conasprella ximenes (Gray, 1839)
- Conus yemanjae van Mol, Tursch & Kempf, 1967: synonym of Artemidiconus selenae (van Mol, Tursch & Kempf, 1967)
- Conus zealandicus Hutton, 1873: synonym of Conus ventricosus Gmelin, 1791
- Conus zeylandicus [sic]: synonym of Conus zeylanicus Gmelin, 1791
- Conus zukiae Shikama, 1979: synonym of Conus mustelinus Hwass in Bruguière, 1792
- Conus zulu Petuch, 1979: synonym of Conus betulinus Linnaeus, 1758

== Nomina dubia ==
This is a list of species in Conus that have a doubtful name (nomen dubium)

- Conus abbotti Clench, 1942 (after R. Tucker Abbott) (nomen dubium)
- Conus albidus Schröter, 1803 (nomen dubium)
- Conus amethysteus Link, 1807 (nomen dubium)
- Conus argillaceus Perry, 1811 (nomen dubium)
- Conus bandatus Perry, 1811 (nomen dubium)
- Conus bicinctus Donovan, 1826 (nomen dubium)
- Conus cinereus Schröter, 1803 (nomen dubium)
- Conus clandestinus Shikama, 1979 (nomen dubium)
- Conus coralloides Perry, 1811 (nomen dubium)
- Conus costatus Gmelin, 1791 (nomen dubium)
- Conus fasciatus Schröter, 1803 (nomen dubium)
- Conus felinus Link, 1807 (nomen dubium)
- Conus ferrugatus G. B. Sowerby I, 1834 (nomen dubium)
- Conus feruginosus Mawe, 1823 (nomen dubium)
- Conus fritillaria Lichtenstein, 1794 (nomen dubium)
- Conus fulgurans Hwass in Bruguière, 1792 (nomen dubium)
- Conus fulmineus Gmelin, 1791 (nomen dubium)
- Conus fulvus Schröter, 1803 (nomen dubium)
- Conus gigas Fischer von Waldheim, 1807 (nomen dubium)
- Conus guienensis Schröter, 1803 (nomen nudum)
- Conus japonicus Hwass in Bruguière, 1792 (nomen dubium)
- Conus lacteus Reeve, 1844 (nomen dubium)
- Conus laevigatus Link, 1807 (nomen dubium)
- Conus lamellosus Hwass in Bruguière, 1792 (nomen dubium)
- Conus lar Lichtenstein, 1794 (nomen dubium)
- Conus leaeneus Link, 1807 (nomen dubium)
- Conus lemur Lichtenstein, 1794 (nomen dubium)
- Conus marmoratus Schröter, 1803 (nomen dubium)
- Conus maurus King, 1826 (nomen dubium)
- Conus melancholicus Lamarck, 1810 (nomen dubium)
- Conus minimus Hwass in Bruguière, 1792 (nomen dubium)
- Conus niveus Gmelin, 1791 (nomen dubium)
- Conus oculatus Gmelin, 1791 (nomen dubium)
- Conus olea Schröter, 1803 (nomen dubium)
- Conus papillaris G. B. Sowerby II, 1833 (nomen dubium)
- Conus pardalinus Link, 1807 (nomen dubium)
- Conus phoebeus Jousseaume, 1894 (nomen dubium)
- Conus porcellaneus Fischer von Waldheim, 1807 (nomen dubium)
- Conus puniceus Schröter, 1803 (nomen dubium)
- Conus rubescens Schröter, 1803 (nomen dubium)
- Conus sardus Link, 1807 (nomen dubium)
- Conus scriptus Deshayes, 1831 (nomen dubium)
- Conus strigatus Hwass in Bruguière, 1792 (nomen dubium)
- Conus submarginatus G. B. Sowerby II, 1870 (nomen dubium)
- Conus tristis Reeve, 1844 (nomen dubium)
- Conus unicolor G. B. Sowerby II, 1833 (nomen dubium)
- Conus virgineus Link, 1807 (nomen dubium)
- Conus vitifera Perry, 1811 (nomen dubium)
- Conus vividus G. B. Sowerby III, 1914 (nomen dubium)
