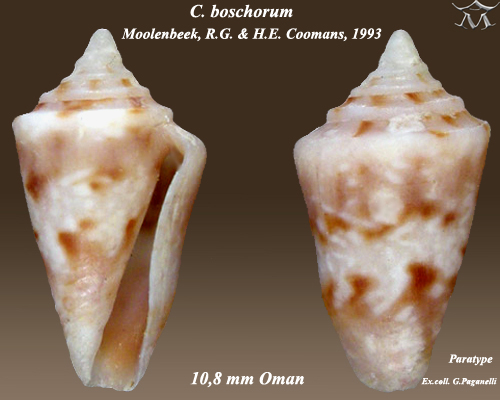
- Apertural and abapertural views of shell of Pseudolilliconus boschorum Moolenbeek, R.G. & H.E. Coomans, 1993

Scientific classification
- Kingdom: Animalia
- Phylum: Mollusca
- Class: Gastropoda
- Subclass: Caenogastropoda
- Order: Neogastropoda
- Superfamily: Conoidea
- Family: Conidae
- Genus: Pseudolilliconus; Tucker & Tenorio, 2009

Type species
- Conus boschorum Moolenbeek & Coomans, 1993

Synonyms
- Conus (Pseudolilliconus) Tucker & Tenorio, 2009

= Pseudolilliconus =

Genus of gastropods

Pseudolilliconus is a genus of sea snails, marine gastropod mollusks in the family Conidae, the cone snails and their allies.

== Species ==
- Pseudolilliconus boschorum (Moolenbeek & Coomans, 1993) represented as Conus boschorum Moolenbeek & Coomans, 1993 (alternate representation)
- Pseudolilliconus korni (G. Raybaudi Massilia, 1993) represented as Conus korni G. Raybaudi Massilia, 1993 (alternate representation)
- Pseudolilliconus kuiperi (Moolenbeek, 2006) represented as Conus kuiperi Moolenbeek, 2006 (alternate representation)

Synonyms

- Pseudolilliconus levis Bozzetti, 2012: synonym of Conus (Pseudolilliconus) levis (Bozzetti, 2012) represented as Conus levis (Bozzetti, 2012)
- Pseudolilliconus scalarispira Bozzetti, 2012: synonym of Conus (Pseudolilliconus) scalarispira (Bozzetti, 2012) represented as Conus scalarispira (Bozzetti, 2012)
- Pseudolilliconus traillii (A. Adams, 1855) represented as Conus traillii A. Adams, 1855 (alternate representation)
- Pseudolilliconus visseri (Delsaerdt, 1990) represented as Conus visseri Delsaerdt, 1990 (alternate representation)
- Pseudolilliconus wallacei (Lorenz & Morrison, 2004) represented as Conus wallacei (Lorenz & Morrison, 2004) (alternate representation)
