= C. wallacei =

C. wallacei may refer to:

- Caenorhabditis wallacei, a species of nematodes
- Capito wallacei, the scarlet-banded barbet, a species of birds
- Choeromorpha wallacei, a species of beetles
- Clivina wallacei, a species of ground beetles
- Conus wallacei, a species of sea snails
- Copelatus wallacei, a species of diving beetles
