= Choeromorpha polynesus =

Scientific classification
- Kingdom: Animalia
- Phylum: Arthropoda
- Class: Insecta
- Order: Coleoptera
- Suborder: Polyphaga
- Infraorder: Cucujiformia
- Family: Cerambycidae
- Genus: Choeromorpha
- Species: C. polynesus

Binomial name
- Choeromorpha polynesus (White, 1856)

Synonyms
- Agelasta polynesus White, 1856; Agelasta polynesa White, 1856 (misspelling); Choeromorpha polynesa (White, 1856) (misspelling)

Species of beetle

Choeromorpha polynesus is a species of beetle in the family Cerambycidae. It was described by White in 1856, originally under the genus Agelasta. It is known from Borneo, Malaysia and Indonesia.
