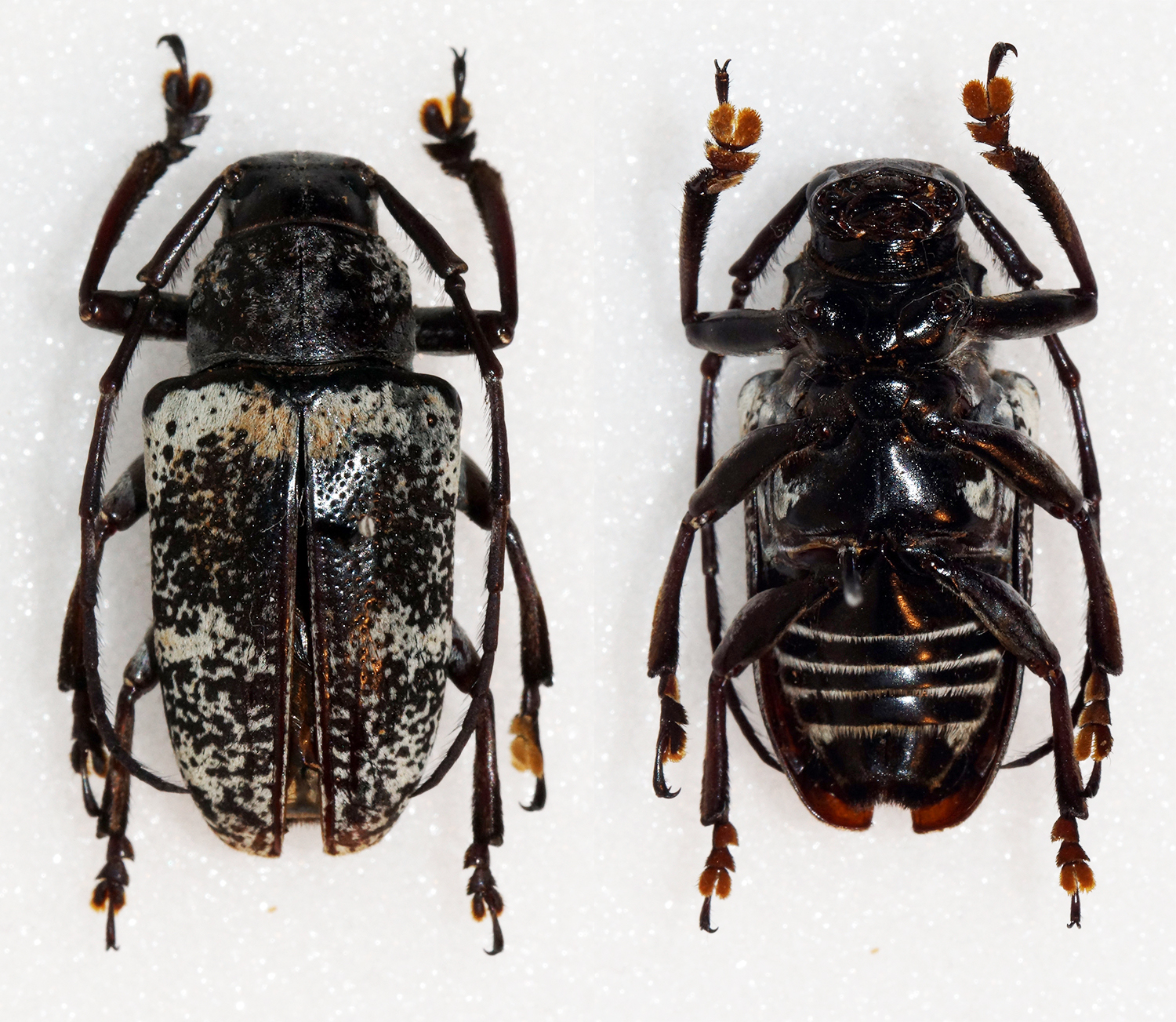

Scientific classification
- Kingdom: Animalia
- Phylum: Arthropoda
- Clade: Pancrustacea
- Class: Insecta
- Order: Coleoptera
- Suborder: Polyphaga
- Infraorder: Cucujiformia
- Family: Cerambycidae
- Genus: Choeromorpha
- Species: C. sulphurea

Binomial name
- Choeromorpha sulphurea (Pascoe, 1865)

Synonyms
- Agelasta sulphurea Pascoe, 1865

= Choeromorpha sulphurea =

Species of beetle

Choeromorpha sulphurea is a species of beetle in the family Cerambycidae. It was described by Francis Polkinghorne Pascoe in 1865, originally under the genus Agelasta. It is known from Sulawesi.
