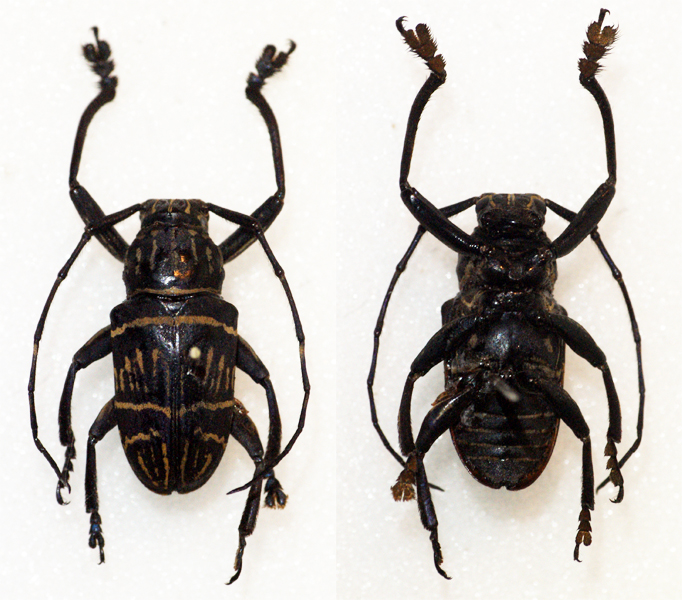

Scientific classification
- Kingdom: Animalia
- Phylum: Arthropoda
- Class: Insecta
- Order: Coleoptera
- Suborder: Polyphaga
- Infraorder: Cucujiformia
- Family: Cerambycidae
- Genus: Choeromorpha
- Species: C. mystica

Binomial name
- Choeromorpha mystica (Pascoe, 1869)

Synonyms
- Agelasta mystica Pascoe, 1869; Aprophata gryphogramma Heller, 1916

= Choeromorpha mystica =

Species of beetle

Choeromorpha mystica is a species of beetle in the family Cerambycidae. It was described by Francis Polkinghorne Pascoe in 1869, originally under the genus Agelasta. It is known from the Philippines.
