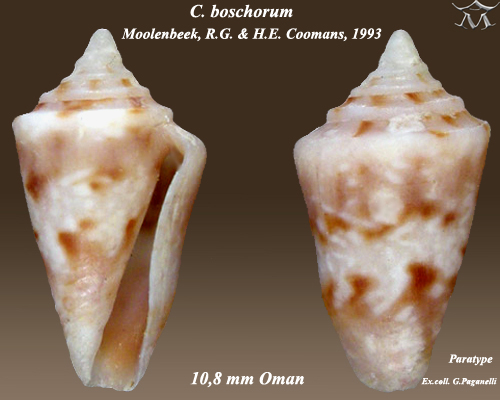
- Apertural and abapertural views of shell of Pseudolilliconus boschorum

Conservation status
- Near Threatened (IUCN 3.1)

Scientific classification
- Kingdom: Animalia
- Phylum: Mollusca
- Class: Gastropoda
- Subclass: Caenogastropoda
- Order: Neogastropoda
- Superfamily: Conoidea
- Family: Conidae
- Genus: Pseudolilliconus
- Species: P. boschorum

Binomial name
- Pseudolilliconus boschorum (Moolenbeek & Coomans, 1993)

Synonyms
- Conus (Pseudolilliconus) boschorum Moolenbeek & Coomans, 1993 accepted, alternate representation; Conus boschorum Moolenbeek & Coomans, 1993

= Pseudolilliconus boschorum =

Species of gastropod

Pseudolilliconus boschorum is a species of sea snail, a marine gastropod mollusk in the family Conidae, the cone snails and their allies.

Like all species within the genus Conus, these snails are predatory and venomous. They are capable of stinging humans, therefore live ones should be handled carefully or not at all.

== Description ==
The length of the shell varies between 4 mm and 13 mm.

== Distribution ==
This marine species occurs off Masirah Island, Oman.
