= Pygmaeconus micarius =

Scientific classification
- Kingdom: Animalia
- Phylum: Mollusca
- Class: Gastropoda
- Subclass: Caenogastropoda
- Order: Neogastropoda
- Superfamily: Conoidea
- Family: Conidae
- Genus: Pygmaeconus
- Species: P. micarius

Binomial name
- Pygmaeconus micarius (Hedley, 1912)

Synonyms
- Conus micarius Hedley, 1912; Lilliconus micarius Hedley, C., 1912; Mitromorpha micaria (Hedley, 1912)

Species of gastropod

Pygmaeconus micarius is a species of sea snail, a marine gastropod mollusk in the family Conidae.
