= Pygmaeconus papalis =

Scientific classification
- Kingdom: Animalia
- Phylum: Mollusca
- Class: Gastropoda
- Subclass: Caenogastropoda
- Order: Neogastropoda
- Superfamily: Conoidea
- Family: Conidae
- Genus: Pygmaeconus
- Species: P. papalis

Binomial name
- Pygmaeconus papalis (Weinkauff, 1875)

Synonyms
- Conus coronatus Reeve, 1849 (invalid: junior homonym of Conus coronatus Gmelin, 1791; C. papalis is a replacement name); Conus papalis Weinkauff, 1875; Mitromorpha coronata (Reeve, 1849); Mitromorpha papalis (Weinkauff, 1875)

Species of gastropod

Pygmaeconus papalis is a species of sea snail, a marine gastropod mollusk in the family Conidae.
