= Choeromorpha mediofasciata =

Scientific classification
- Kingdom: Animalia
- Phylum: Arthropoda
- Class: Insecta
- Order: Coleoptera
- Suborder: Polyphaga
- Infraorder: Cucujiformia
- Family: Cerambycidae
- Genus: Choeromorpha
- Species: C. mediofasciata

Binomial name
- Choeromorpha mediofasciata Breuning, 1974

Synonyms
- Choeromorpha mediofasciata Breuning & De Jong, 1941 nec Breuning, 1939

Species of beetle

Choeromorpha mediofasciata is a species of beetle in the family Cerambycidae. It was described by Stephan von Breuning in 1974. It is known from Borneo.
