= Choeromorpha irrorata =

Scientific classification
- Kingdom: Animalia
- Phylum: Arthropoda
- Class: Insecta
- Order: Coleoptera
- Suborder: Polyphaga
- Infraorder: Cucujiformia
- Family: Cerambycidae
- Genus: Choeromorpha
- Species: C. irrorata

Binomial name
- Choeromorpha irrorata (Pascoe, 1857)

Species of beetle

Choeromorpha irrorata is a species of beetle in the family Cerambycidae. It was described by Francis Polkinghorne Pascoe in 1857.
