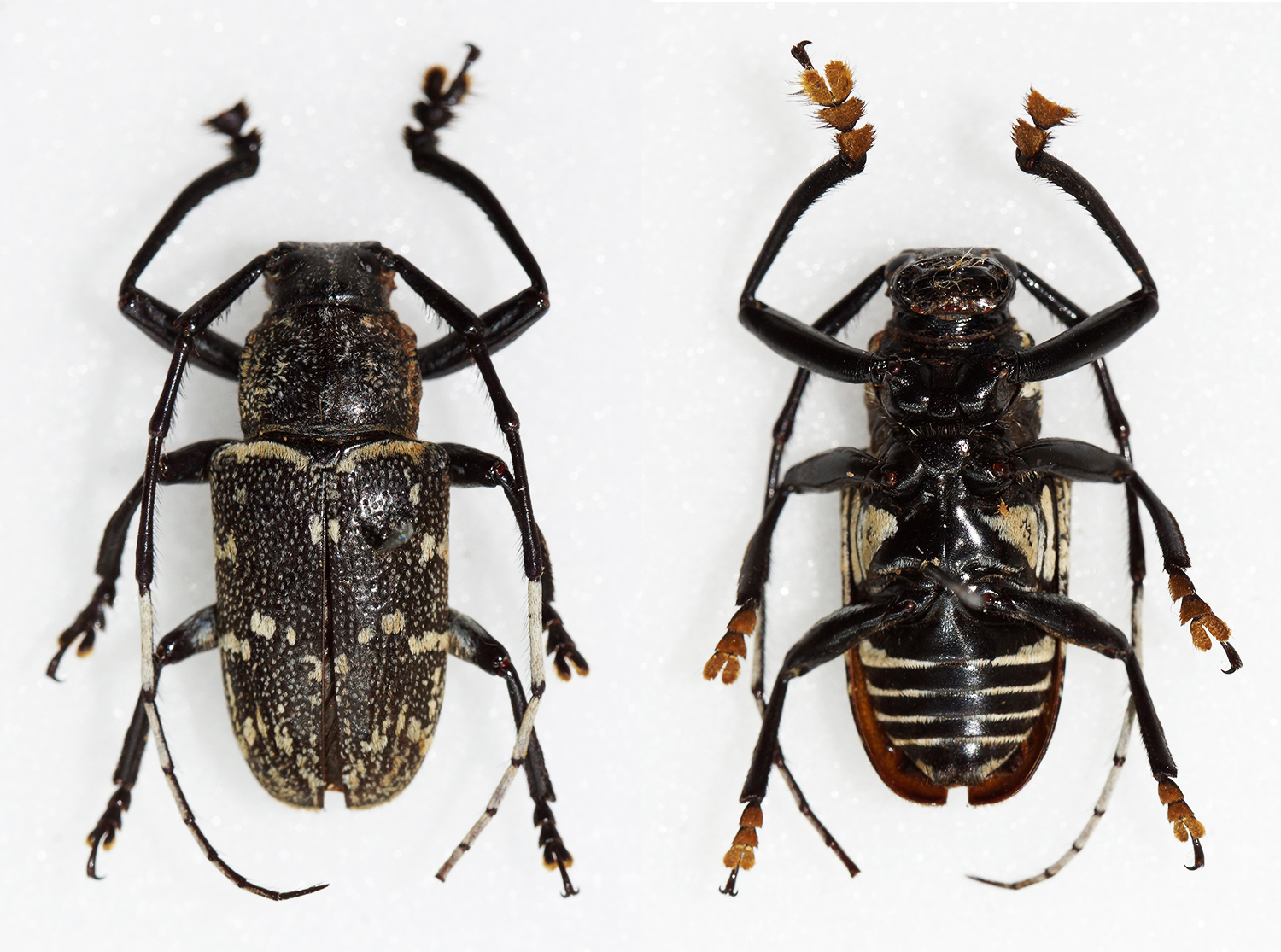

Scientific classification
- Kingdom: Animalia
- Phylum: Arthropoda
- Class: Insecta
- Order: Coleoptera
- Suborder: Polyphaga
- Infraorder: Cucujiformia
- Family: Cerambycidae
- Genus: Choeromorpha
- Species: C. polyspila

Binomial name
- Choeromorpha polyspila (Pascoe, 1865)

Synonyms
- Agelasta polyspila Pascoe, 1865

= Choeromorpha polyspila =

Species of beetle

Choeromorpha polyspila is a species of beetle in the family Cerambycidae. It was described by Francis Polkinghorne Pascoe in 1865.
