= Pseudolilliconus kuiperi =

Conservation status
- Data Deficient (IUCN 3.1)

Scientific classification
- Kingdom: Animalia
- Phylum: Mollusca
- Class: Gastropoda
- Subclass: Caenogastropoda
- Order: Neogastropoda
- Superfamily: Conoidea
- Family: Conidae
- Genus: Pseudolilliconus
- Species: P. kuiperi

Binomial name
- Pseudolilliconus kuiperi (Moolenbeek, 2006)

Synonyms
- Conus (Lilliconus) kuiperi Moolenbeek, 2006 (basionym); Conus (Pseudolilliconus) kuiperi Moolenbeek, 2006 · accepted, alternate representation; Pseudolilliconus kuiperi Moolenbeek, 2006

Species of gastropod

Pseudolilliconus kuiperi is a predatory species of sea snail. Like all species within the genus Conus, these snails are predatory and venomous. P. kuiperi are capable of stinging humans, therefore live ones should be handled carefully or not at all.

== Description ==
The size of the shell attains 5.9 millimetres (0.23 in).

== Distribution ==
This marine benthic species occurs off Oman.
