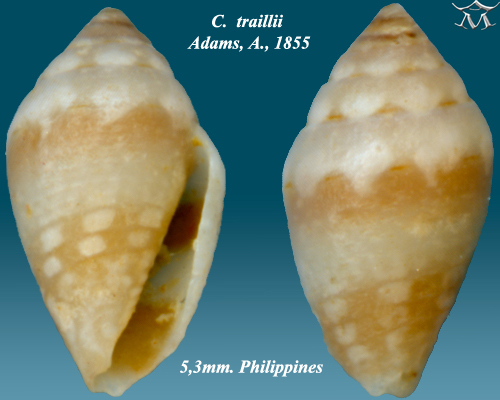
- Shells of Pygmaeconus traillii

Scientific classification
- Kingdom: Animalia
- Phylum: Mollusca
- Class: Gastropoda
- Subclass: Caenogastropoda
- Order: Neogastropoda
- Superfamily: Conoidea
- Family: Conidae
- Genus: Pygmaeconus; Puillandre & Tenorio, 2017

Type species
- Conus traillii A. Adams, 1855

= Pygmaeconus =

Genus of gastropods

Pygmaeconus is a genus of predatory sea snails, or cone snails, marine gastropod mollusks in the family Conidae.

== Species ==
- Pygmaeconus atomus Lorenz, Tenorio, Abalde, Zardoya & Concepcion, 2025
- Pygmaeconus micarius (Hedley, 1912)
- Pygmaeconus molaerivus (Dekkers, 2016)
- Pygmaeconus papalis (Weinkauff, 1875)
- Pygmaeconus traillii (A. Adams, 1855)
- Pygmaeconus visseri (Delsaerdt, 1990)
- Pygmaeconus wallacei (Lorenz & Morrison, 2004)
