= Choeromorpha pigra =

Scientific classification
- Kingdom: Animalia
- Phylum: Arthropoda
- Class: Insecta
- Order: Coleoptera
- Suborder: Polyphaga
- Infraorder: Cucujiformia
- Family: Cerambycidae
- Genus: Choeromorpha
- Species: C. pigra

Binomial name
- Choeromorpha pigra Chevrolat, 1843

Synonyms
- Choeromorpha pigra Aurivillius, 1920 nec Chevrolat, 1843

Species of beetle

Choeromorpha pigra is a species of beetle in the family Cerambycidae. It was described by Chevrolat in 1843. It is known from Sumatra.
