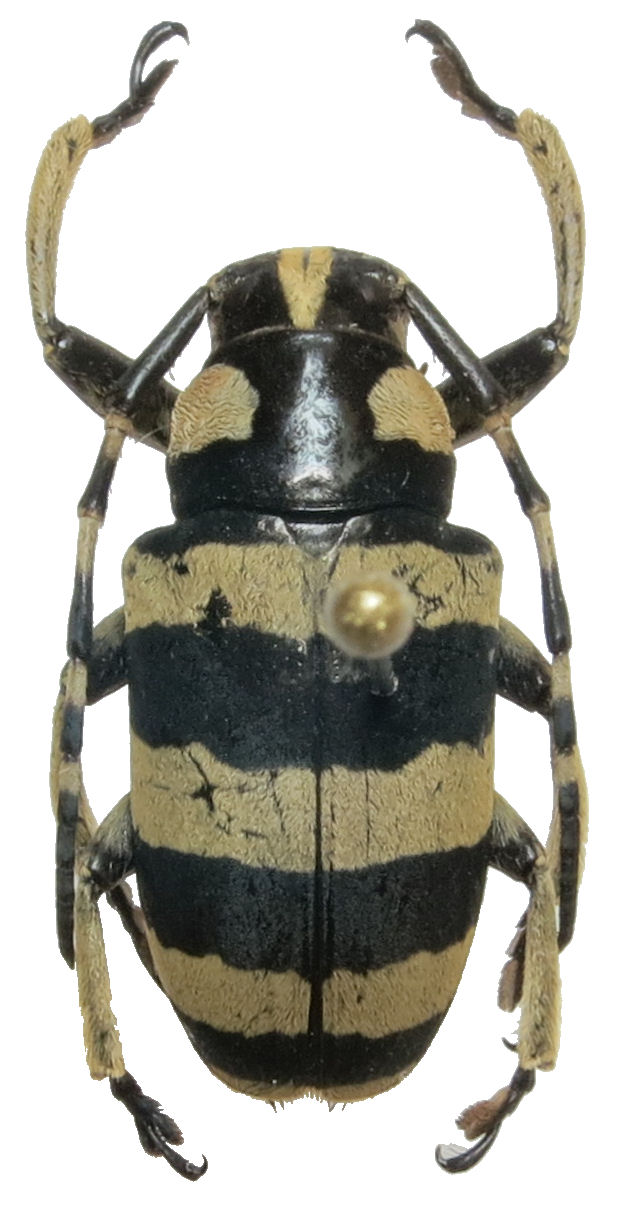
- Choeromorpha trifasciata from Philippines

Scientific classification
- Kingdom: Animalia
- Phylum: Arthropoda
- Class: Insecta
- Order: Coleoptera
- Suborder: Polyphaga
- Infraorder: Cucujiformia
- Family: Cerambycidae
- Genus: Choeromorpha
- Species: C. trifasciata

Binomial name
- Choeromorpha trifasciata Newman, 1842

= Choeromorpha trifasciata =

Species of beetle

Choeromorpha trifasciata is a species of beetle in the family Cerambycidae. It was described by Newman in 1842.
