= Choeromorpha lambii =

Scientific classification
- Kingdom: Animalia
- Phylum: Arthropoda
- Class: Insecta
- Order: Coleoptera
- Suborder: Polyphaga
- Infraorder: Cucujiformia
- Family: Cerambycidae
- Genus: Choeromorpha
- Species: C. lambii

Binomial name
- Choeromorpha lambii (Pascoe, 1866)

Synonyms
- Agelasta lambii Pascoe, 1866; Choeromorpha lambi (Pascoe) Breuning, 1939 (misspelling)

Species of beetle

Choeromorpha lambii is a species of beetle in the family Cerambycidae. It was described by Pascoe in 1866. It is known from Malaysia and Sumatra.

== Subspecies ==
- Choeromorpha lambii lambii (Pascoe, 1866)
- Choeromorpha lambii sumatrana Hüdepohl, 1998
