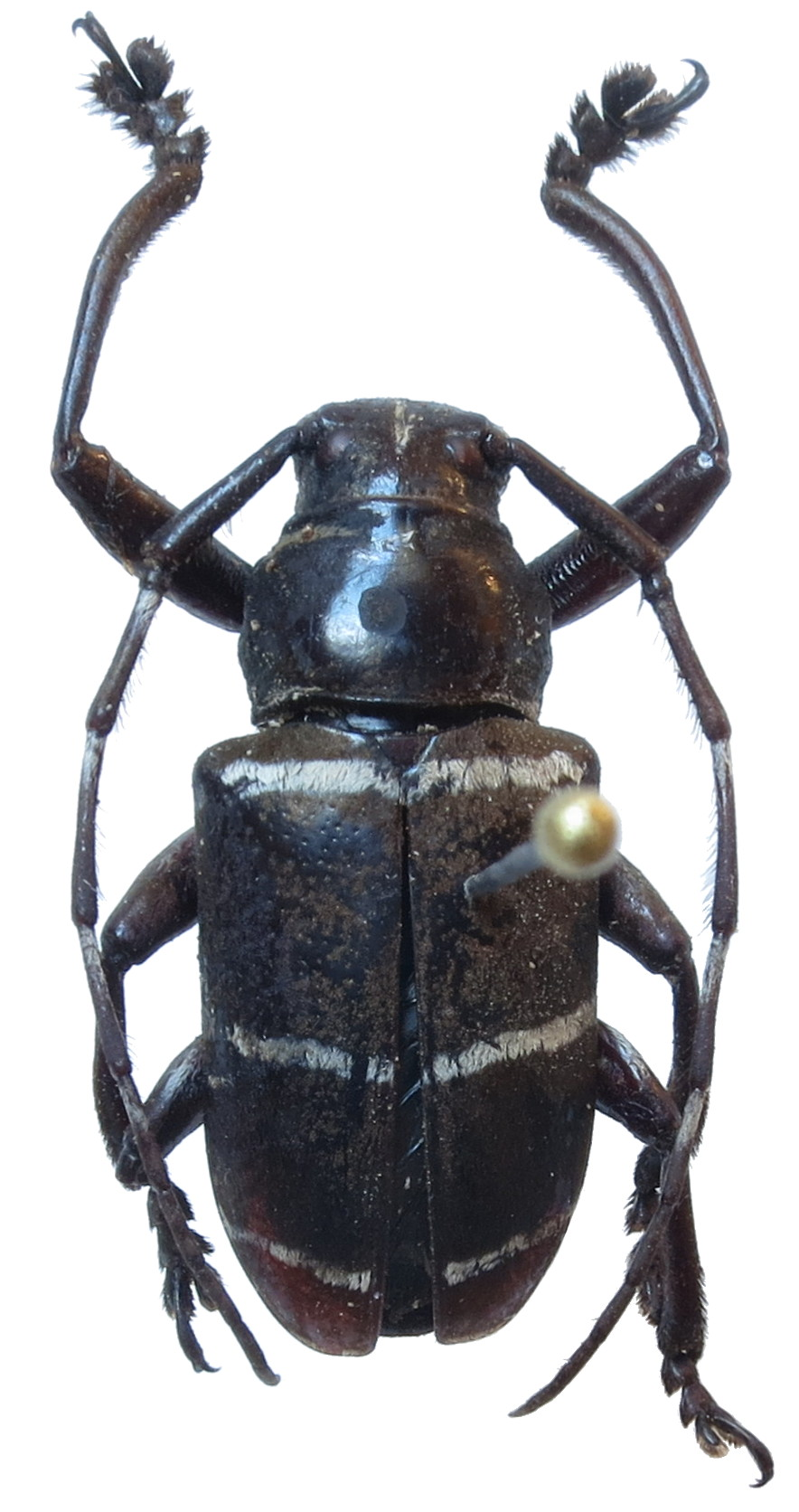
- C. violaceicornis from Philippines

Scientific classification
- Kingdom: Animalia
- Phylum: Arthropoda
- Class: Insecta
- Order: Coleoptera
- Suborder: Polyphaga
- Infraorder: Cucujiformia
- Family: Cerambycidae
- Genus: Choeromorpha
- Species: C. violaceicornis

Binomial name
- Choeromorpha violaceicornis Heller, 1921

= Choeromorpha violaceicornis =

Species of beetle

Choeromorpha violaceicornis is a species of beetle in the family Cerambycidae. It was described by Heller in 1921.
