= Choeromorpha flavolineata =

Scientific classification
- Kingdom: Animalia
- Phylum: Arthropoda
- Clade: Pancrustacea
- Class: Insecta
- Order: Coleoptera
- Suborder: Polyphaga
- Infraorder: Cucujiformia
- Family: Cerambycidae
- Genus: Choeromorpha
- Species: C. flavolineata

Binomial name
- Choeromorpha flavolineata Breuning, 1939

Synonyms
- Choeromorpha flavolineata Breuning & De Jong, 1941 nec Breuning, 1939

Species of beetle

Choeromorpha flavolineata is a species of beetle in the family Cerambycidae. It was described by Stephan von Breuning in 1939. It is known from Sulawesi.
