= Choeromorpha latefasciata =

Scientific classification
- Kingdom: Animalia
- Phylum: Arthropoda
- Class: Insecta
- Order: Coleoptera
- Suborder: Polyphaga
- Infraorder: Cucujiformia
- Family: Cerambycidae
- Genus: Choeromorpha
- Species: C. latefasciata

Binomial name
- Choeromorpha latefasciata Newman, 1842

Species of beetle

Choeromorpha latefasciata is a species of beetle in the family Cerambycidae. It was described by Newman in 1842.
