= Choeromorpha muscaria =

Scientific classification
- Kingdom: Animalia
- Phylum: Arthropoda
- Class: Insecta
- Order: Coleoptera
- Suborder: Polyphaga
- Infraorder: Cucujiformia
- Family: Cerambycidae
- Genus: Choeromorpha
- Species: C. muscaria

Binomial name
- Choeromorpha muscaria (Heller, 1915)

Species of beetle

Choeromorpha muscaria is a species of beetle in the family Cerambycidae. It was described by Heller in 1915.
