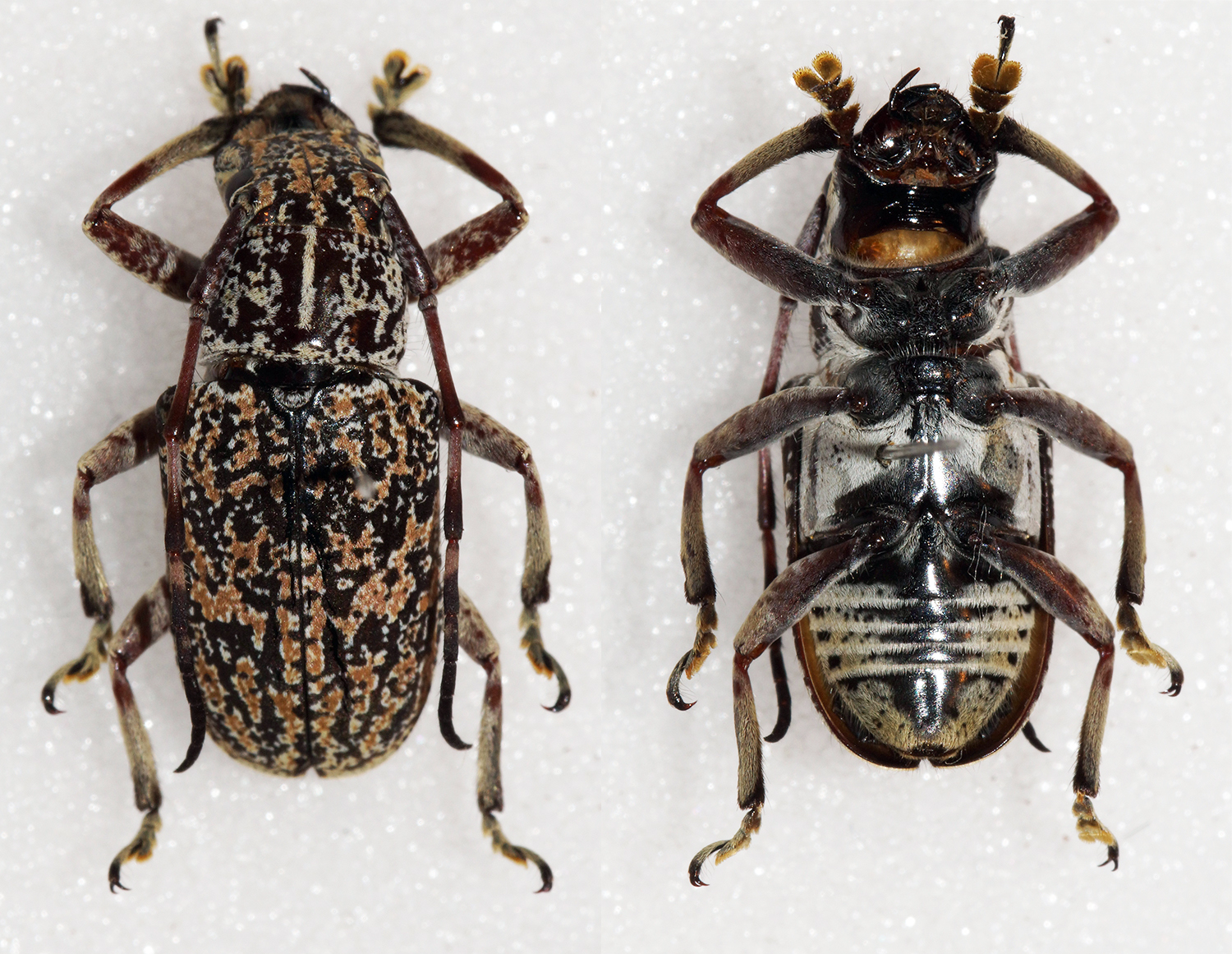

Scientific classification
- Kingdom: Animalia
- Phylum: Arthropoda
- Class: Insecta
- Order: Coleoptera
- Suborder: Polyphaga
- Infraorder: Cucujiformia
- Family: Cerambycidae
- Genus: Choeromorpha
- Species: C. amica

Binomial name
- Choeromorpha amica (White, 1856)

Synonyms
- Agelasta amica White, 1856

= Choeromorpha amica =

Species of beetle

Choeromorpha amica is a species of beetle in the family Cerambycidae. It was described by White in 1856. It is known from Malaysia and Borneo.
