= Pygmaeconus molaerivus =

Scientific classification
- Kingdom: Animalia
- Phylum: Mollusca
- Class: Gastropoda
- Subclass: Caenogastropoda
- Order: Neogastropoda
- Superfamily: Conoidea
- Family: Conidae
- Genus: Pygmaeconus
- Species: P. molaerivus

Binomial name
- Pygmaeconus molaerivus (Dekkers, 2016)

Synonyms
- Conus (Pseudolilliconus) molaerivus Dekkers, 2016; Conus molaerivus Dekkers, 2016

Species of gastropod

Pygmaeconus molaerivus is a species of sea snail, a marine gastropod mollusk, in the family Conidae, the cone snails and their allies.
