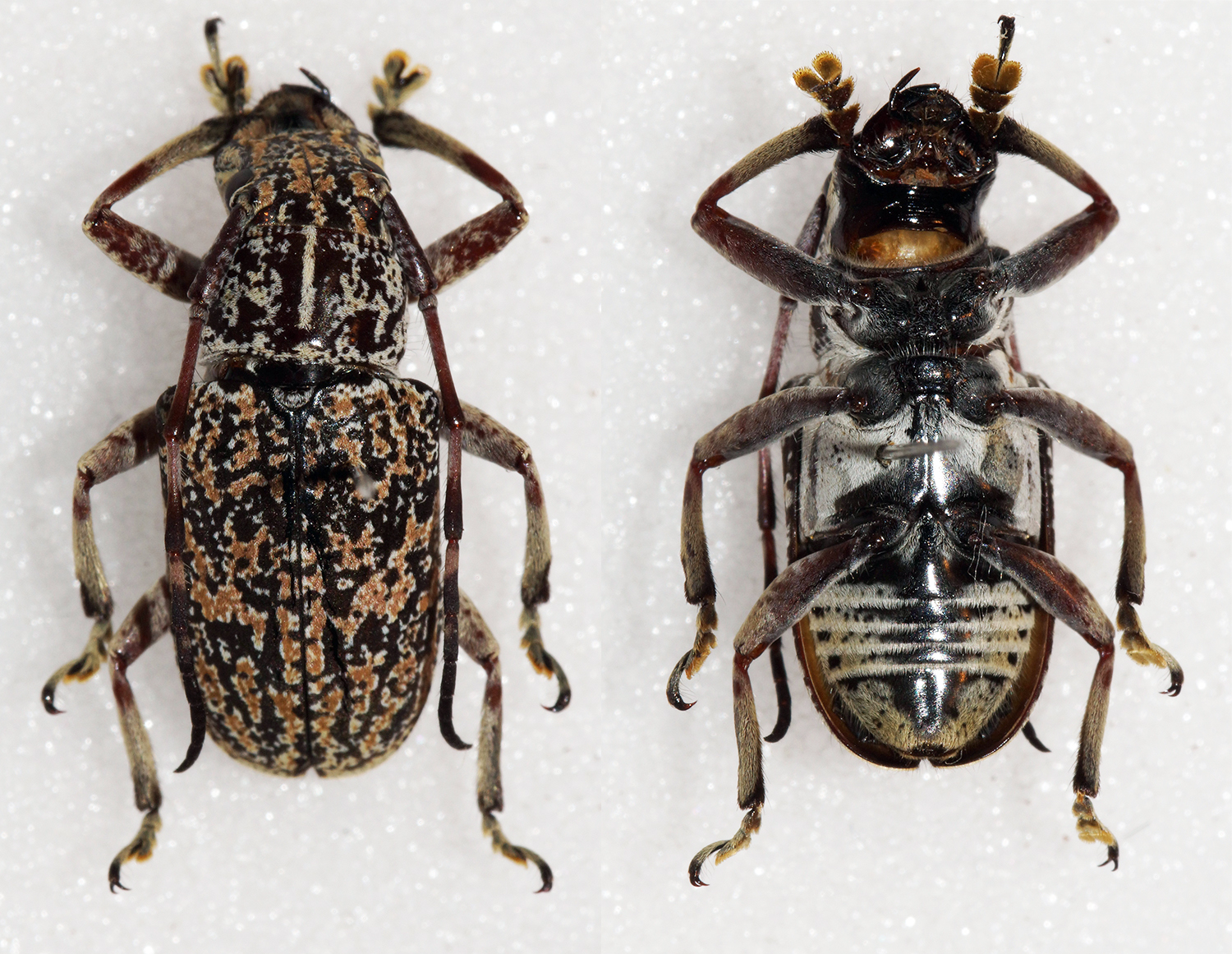
- Choeromorpha amica

Scientific classification
- Kingdom: Animalia
- Phylum: Arthropoda
- Class: Insecta
- Order: Coleoptera
- Suborder: Polyphaga
- Infraorder: Cucujiformia
- Family: Cerambycidae
- Subfamily: Lamiinae
- Tribe: Mesosini
- Genus: Choeromorpha; Chevrolat, 1843

= Choeromorpha =

Genus of beetles

Choeromorpha is a genus of longhorn beetles of the subfamily Lamiinae, containing the following species:

subgenus Achoeromorpha

- Choeromorpha brunneomaculata Breuning, 1935
- Choeromorpha nigromaculata Breuning, 1981

subgenus Choeromorpha

- Choeromorpha albofasciata Breuning, 1936
- Choeromorpha albovaria Breuning, 1954
- Choeromorpha amica (White, 1856)
- Choeromorpha callizona (White, 1856)
- Choeromorpha celebiana Breuning, 1947
- Choeromorpha flavolineata Breuning, 1939
- Choeromorpha irrorata (Pascoe, 1857)
- Choeromorpha lambii (Pascoe, 1866)
- Choeromorpha latefasciata Newman, 1842
- Choeromorpha mediofasciata Breuning, 1974
- Choeromorpha multivittata Breuning, 1974
- Choeromorpha murina Breuning, 1939
- Choeromorpha muscaria (Heller, 1915)
- Choeromorpha mystica (Pascoe, 1869)
- Choeromorpha panagensis Heller, 1923
- Choeromorpha pigra Chevrolat, 1843
- Choeromorpha polynesus (White, 1856)
- Choeromorpha polyspila (Pascoe, 1865)
- Choeromorpha subfasciata (Pic, 1922)
- Choeromorpha subviolacea Heller, 1923
- Choeromorpha sulphurea (Pascoe, 1865)
- Choeromorpha trifasciata Newman, 1842
- Choeromorpha violaceicornis Heller, 1921
- Choeromorpha vivesi Breuning, 1978
- Choeromorpha wallacei (White, 1856)
