= Pygmaeconus atomus =

Scientific classification
- Kingdom: Animalia
- Phylum: Mollusca
- Class: Gastropoda
- Subclass: Caenogastropoda
- Order: Neogastropoda
- Superfamily: Conoidea
- Family: Conidae
- Genus: Pygmaeconus
- Species: P. atomus

Binomial name
- Pygmaeconus atomus Lorenz, Tenorio, Abalde, Zardoya, Concecpion, 2025

Species of gastropod

Pygmaeconus atomus is a species of sea snail, a marine gastropod mollusk in the family Conidae.
