= Choeromorpha brunneomaculata =

Scientific classification
- Kingdom: Animalia
- Phylum: Arthropoda
- Class: Insecta
- Order: Coleoptera
- Suborder: Polyphaga
- Infraorder: Cucujiformia
- Family: Cerambycidae
- Genus: Choeromorpha
- Species: C. brunneomaculata

Binomial name
- Choeromorpha brunneomaculata Breuning, 1935

Species of beetle

Choeromorpha brunneomaculata is a species of beetle in the family Cerambycidae. It was described by Stephan von Breuning in 1935. It is an extant species and it has a non-marine habitat.
