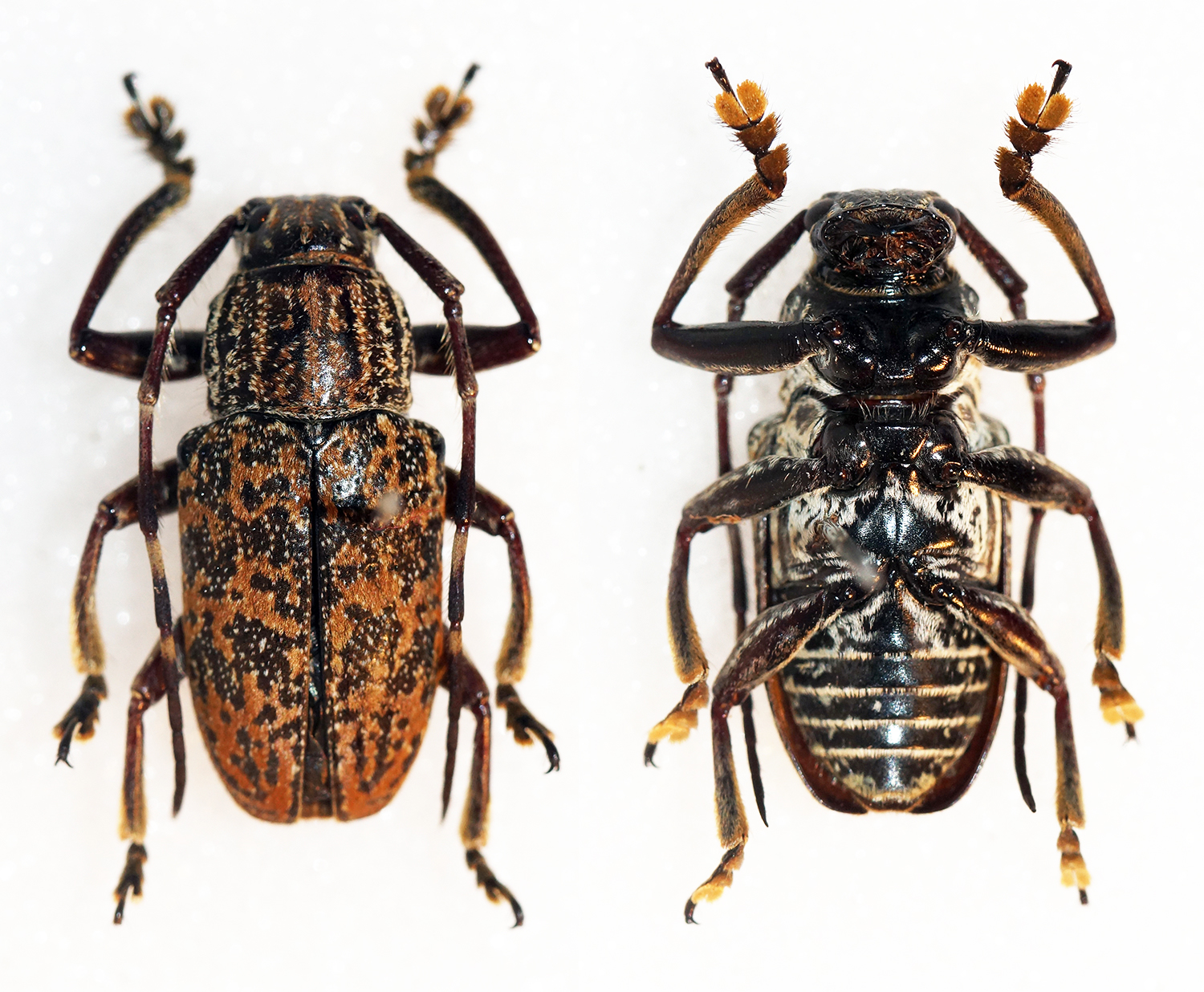

Scientific classification
- Kingdom: Animalia
- Phylum: Arthropoda
- Class: Insecta
- Order: Coleoptera
- Suborder: Polyphaga
- Infraorder: Cucujiformia
- Family: Cerambycidae
- Genus: Choeromorpha
- Species: C. vivesi

Binomial name
- Choeromorpha vivesi Breuning, 1978

= Choeromorpha vivesi =

Species of beetle

Choeromorpha vivesi is a species of beetle in the family Cerambycidae. It was described by Stephan von Breuning in 1978. It is found in Asia, in countries such as Indonesia.
