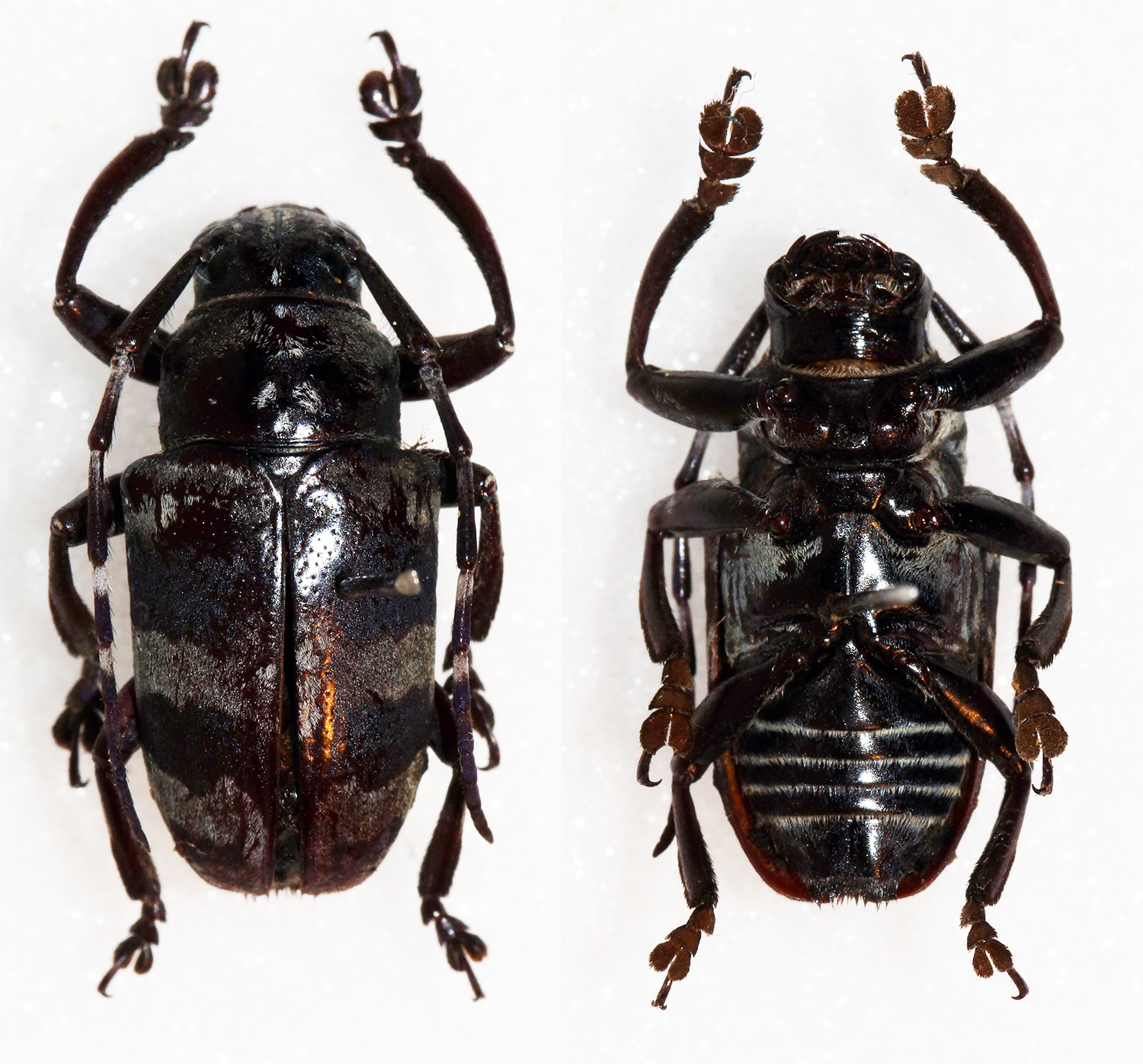
- Female Choeromorpha panagensis measuring 16.5mm

Scientific classification
- Kingdom: Animalia
- Phylum: Arthropoda
- Class: Insecta
- Order: Coleoptera
- Suborder: Polyphaga
- Infraorder: Cucujiformia
- Family: Cerambycidae
- Genus: Choeromorpha
- Species: C. panagensis

Binomial name
- Choeromorpha panagensis Heller, 1923

Synonyms
- Choeromorpha panayensis Heller, 1923

= Choeromorpha panagensis =

Species of beetle

Choeromorpha panayensis is a species of beetle in the family Cerambycidae. It was described by Heller in 1923. It is known from the Philippines.

== Subspecies ==
- Choeromorpha panagensis negrosiana Hüdepohl, 1987
- Choeromorpha panagensis panagensis Heller, 1923
