= Choeromorpha subfasciata =

Scientific classification
- Kingdom: Animalia
- Phylum: Arthropoda
- Class: Insecta
- Order: Coleoptera
- Suborder: Polyphaga
- Infraorder: Cucujiformia
- Family: Cerambycidae
- Genus: Choeromorpha
- Species: C. subfasciata

Binomial name
- Choeromorpha subfasciata (Pic, 1922)

Synonyms
- Agelasta subfasciata (Pic, 1922); Coptops subfasciatus Pic, 1922

Species of beetle

Choeromorpha subfasciata is a species of beetle in the family Cerambycidae. It was described by Maurice Pic in 1922. It is known from Vietnam, Laos and Thailand.
