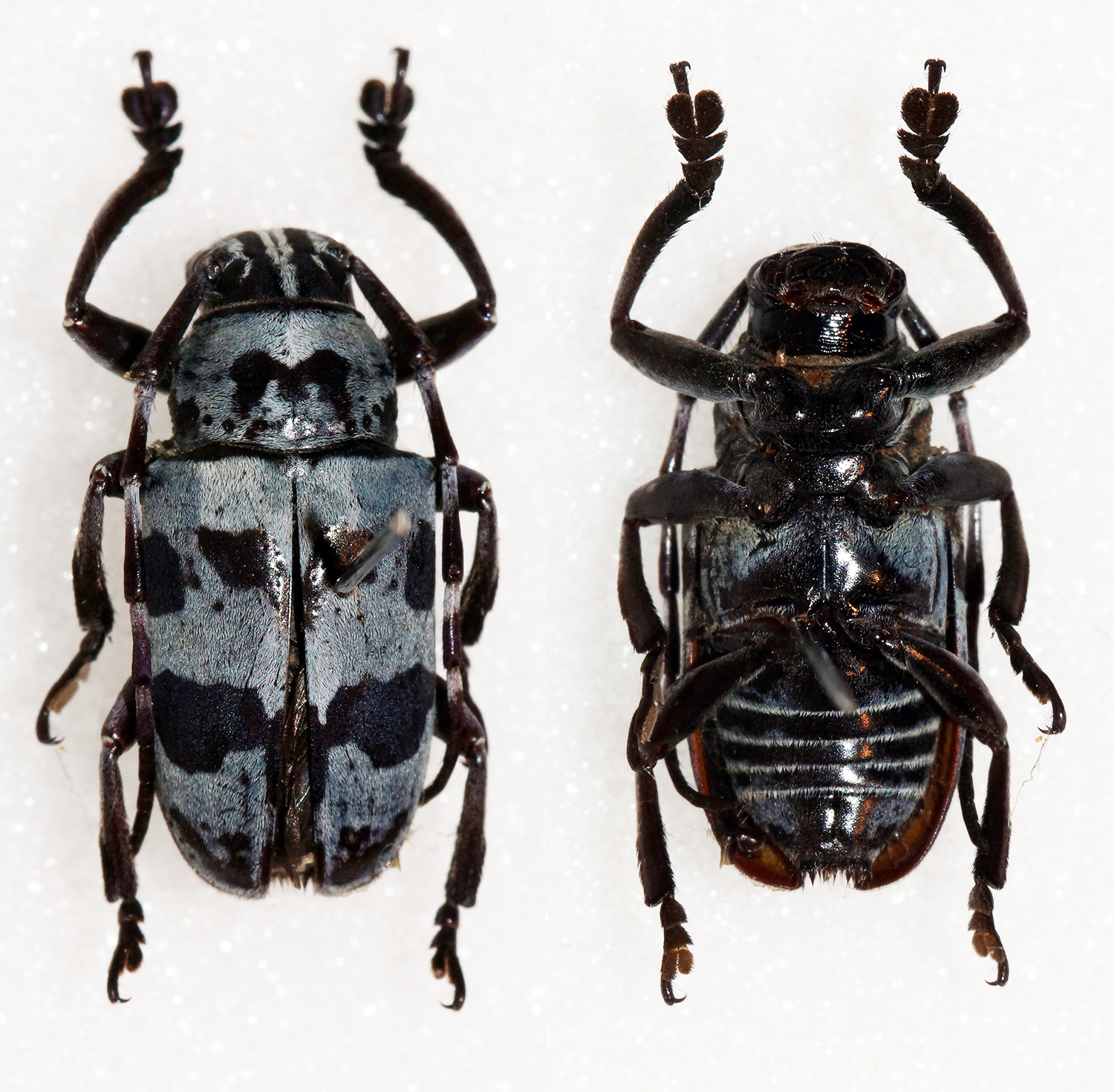

Scientific classification
- Kingdom: Animalia
- Phylum: Arthropoda
- Class: Insecta
- Order: Coleoptera
- Suborder: Polyphaga
- Infraorder: Cucujiformia
- Family: Cerambycidae
- Genus: Choeromorpha
- Species: C. subviolacea

Binomial name
- Choeromorpha subviolacea Heller, 1923

Synonyms
- Choeromorpha semivittata Aurivillius, 1923

= Choeromorpha subviolacea =

Species of beetle

Choeromorpha subviolacea is a species of beetle in the family Cerambycidae. It was described by Heller in 1923. It is known from Philippines.
