= Choeromorpha albovaria =

Scientific classification
- Kingdom: Animalia
- Phylum: Arthropoda
- Class: Insecta
- Order: Coleoptera
- Suborder: Polyphaga
- Infraorder: Cucujiformia
- Family: Cerambycidae
- Genus: Choeromorpha
- Species: C. albovaria

Binomial name
- Choeromorpha albovaria Breuning, 1954

Species of beetle

Choeromorpha albovaria is a species of beetle in the family Cerambycidae. It was described by Stephan von Breuning in 1954.
