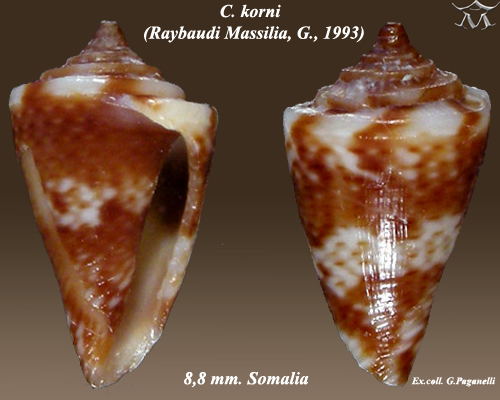
- Apertural and abapertural views of shell of Pseudolilliconus korni

Scientific classification
- Kingdom: Animalia
- Phylum: Mollusca
- Class: Gastropoda
- Subclass: Caenogastropoda
- Order: Neogastropoda
- Superfamily: Conoidea
- Family: Conidae
- Genus: Pseudolilliconus
- Species: P. korni

Binomial name
- Pseudolilliconus korni (G. Raybaudi Massilia, 1993)

Synonyms
- Conus (Leptoconus) korni G. Raybaudi Massilia, 1993 (basionym); Conus (Pseudolilliconus) korni G. Raybaudi Massilia, 1993 · accepted, alternate representation; Conus korni G. Raybaudi Massilia, 1993 (original combination)

= Pseudolilliconus korni =

Species of gastropod

Pseudolilliconus korni is a species of sea snail, a marine gastropod mollusk in the family Conidae, the cone snails and their allies.

Like all species within the genus Conus, these snails are predatory and venomous. They are capable of stinging humans, therefore live ones should be handled carefully or not at all.

== Description ==
The size of the shell varies between 4 mm and 13 mm.

== Distribution ==
This marine species occurs in the Gulf of Aden and off Somalia.

== Bibliography ==
- Raybaudi Massilia G. (1993). From the Gulf of Aden and Somalia: Conus (Leptoconus) korni n. sp. La Conchiglia. 25(267): 24-28, 19 figs.
- Tucker J.K. & Tenorio M.J. (2009) Systematic classification of Recent and fossil conoidean gastropods. Hackenheim: Conchbooks. 296 pp.
- Monnier E., Limpalaër L., Robin A. & Roux C. (2018). A taxonomic iconography of living Conidae. Harxheim: ConchBooks. 2 vols. 1205 pp
