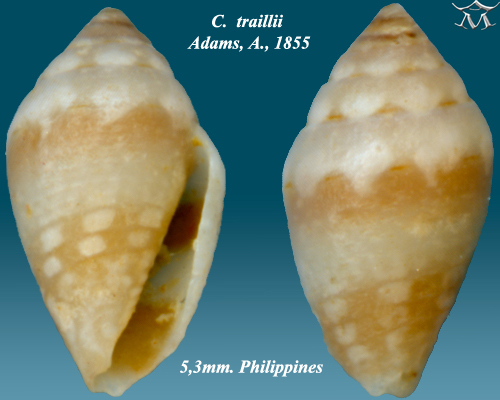
- Apertural and abapertural views of shell of Pygmaeconus traillii (Adams, A., 1855)

Conservation status
- Least Concern (IUCN 3.1)

Scientific classification
- Kingdom: Animalia
- Phylum: Mollusca
- Class: Gastropoda
- Subclass: Caenogastropoda
- Order: Neogastropoda
- Superfamily: Conoidea
- Family: Conidae
- Genus: Pygmaeconus
- Species: P. traillii

Binomial name
- Pygmaeconus traillii (A. Adams, 1855)

Synonyms
- Conus (Pseudolilliconus) traillii A. Adams, 1855 · accepted, alternate representation; Conus traillii A. Adams, 1855 (original combination); Pseudolilliconus traillii (A. Adams, 1855)

= Pygmaeconus traillii =

Species of gastropod

Pygmaeconus traillii is a species of sea snail, a marine gastropod mollusk in the family Conidae, the cone snails and their allies.

Like all species within the genus Conus, these snails are predatory and venomous. They are capable of stinging humans, therefore live ones should be handled carefully or not at all.

== Description ==
The size of the shell varies between 5 mm and 8 mm.

== Distribution ==
This marine species occurs in the Strait of Malacca to the Philippines.
