= Pygmaeconus visseri =

Scientific classification
- Kingdom: Animalia
- Phylum: Mollusca
- Class: Gastropoda
- Subclass: Caenogastropoda
- Order: Neogastropoda
- Superfamily: Conoidea
- Family: Conidae
- Genus: Pygmaeconus
- Species: P. visseri

Binomial name
- Pygmaeconus visseri (Delsaerdt, 1990)

Synonyms
- Conus (Pseudolilliconus) visseri Delsaerdt, 1990 · accepted, alternate representation; Conus visseri Delsaerdt, 1990 (original combination); Pseudolilliconus visseri (Delsaerdt, 1990)

Species of gastropod

Pygmaeconus visseri is a species of sea snail, a marine gastropod mollusk in the family Conidae, the cone snails and their allies. The species is named for J. S. de Visser, who originally collected the specimen.

Like all species within the genus Conus, these snails are predatory and venomous. They are capable of stinging humans, therefore live ones should be handled carefully or not at all.

== Description ==
Like other members of Pygmaeconus, the shell is less than 10 mm in size and rounded. However, the shell of P. visseri has indented grooves on its body whorl instead of the raised ribs that are common to the rest of its genus.

== Distribution ==
This marine species was found off Phuket Island, Thailand.
