= Clivina wallacei =

Scientific classification
- Domain: Eukaryota
- Kingdom: Animalia
- Phylum: Arthropoda
- Class: Insecta
- Order: Coleoptera
- Suborder: Adephaga
- Family: Carabidae
- Genus: Clivina
- Species: C. wallacei

Binomial name
- Clivina wallacei Putzeys, 1866

Species of beetle

Clivina wallacei is a species of ground beetle found in Taiwan, Indonesia, Philippines and New Guinea. It is in the subfamily Scaritinae. It was described by Jules Putzeys in 1866.
