= Conus levis =

Scientific classification
- Kingdom: Animalia
- Phylum: Mollusca
- Class: Gastropoda
- Subclass: Caenogastropoda
- Order: Neogastropoda
- Superfamily: Conoidea
- Family: Conidae
- Genus: Conus
- Species: C. levis

Binomial name
- Conus levis (Bozzetti, 2012)

Synonyms
- Conus (Pseudolilliconus) levis (Bozzetti, 2012) · accepted, alternate representation; Pseudolilliconus levis Bozzetti, 2012 (original combination)

Species of sea snail

Conus levis is a species of sea snail, a marine gastropod mollusk in the family Conidae, the cone snails, cone shells or cones.

These snails are predatory and venomous. They are capable of stinging humans.

== Description ==
Conus levis exhibits a shell that can range from small to medium in size, typically around 9–12 mm in length. The shell is conical with a smooth surface and subtle spirals near the base. The coloration varies, but it generally displays shades of cream or light brown, often with darker spots or bands, which serve as camouflage against sandy or coral reef environments. The snail's body is soft and encased within the shell, with a proboscis used for hunting prey.

== Distribution ==
This marine species occurs off Southern Madagascar.
