= Pygmaeconus wallacei =

Scientific classification
- Kingdom: Animalia
- Phylum: Mollusca
- Class: Gastropoda
- Subclass: Caenogastropoda
- Order: Neogastropoda
- Superfamily: Conoidea
- Family: Conidae
- Genus: Pygmaeconus
- Species: P. wallacei

Binomial name
- Pygmaeconus wallacei (Lorenz & Morrison, 2004)

Synonyms
- Conus (Pseudolilliconus) wallacei (Lorenz & Morrison, 2004) ·; Conus wallacei (Lorenz & Morrison, 2004); Lilliconus wallacei Lorenz & Morrison, 2004; Pseudolilliconus wallacei (Lorenz & Morrison, 2004)

Species of gastropod

Pygmaeconus wallacei is a species of sea snail, a marine gastropod mollusk in the family Conidae, the cone snails and their allies.

Like all species within the genus Conus, these snails are predatory and venomous. They are capable of stinging humans.

== Description ==
The length of the shell attains 6 mm.

== Distribution ==
This marine species occurs off Sulawesi, Indonesia.
