= Agelasta =

Rock formation at Eleusis in Greek mythology

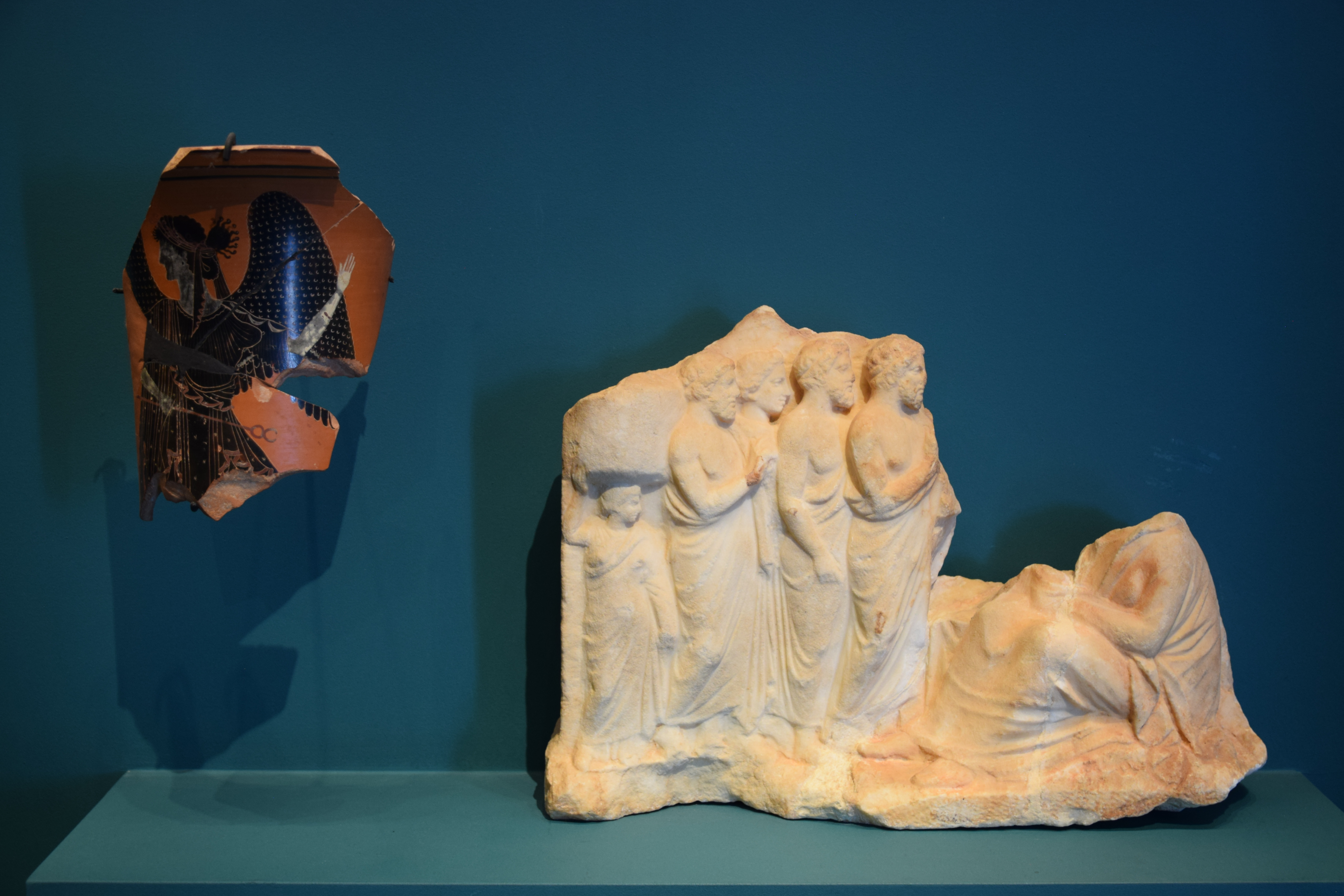
Demeter on the Agelasta stone relief, Archaeological Museum of Eleusis, Greece.

In Greek mythology, Agelasta (Ancient Greek: Ἀγέλαστος, Greek: Αγέλαστος πέτρα, "smile-less stone") was the name of the stone on which Demeter rested during her search for Persephone.

In modern culture, Agelasta inspired the title of a documentary by Philippos Koutsaftis (Φίλιππος Κουτσαφτής), called Agelastos Petra (Αγέλαστος Πέτρα, "smile-less stone", 2000).
