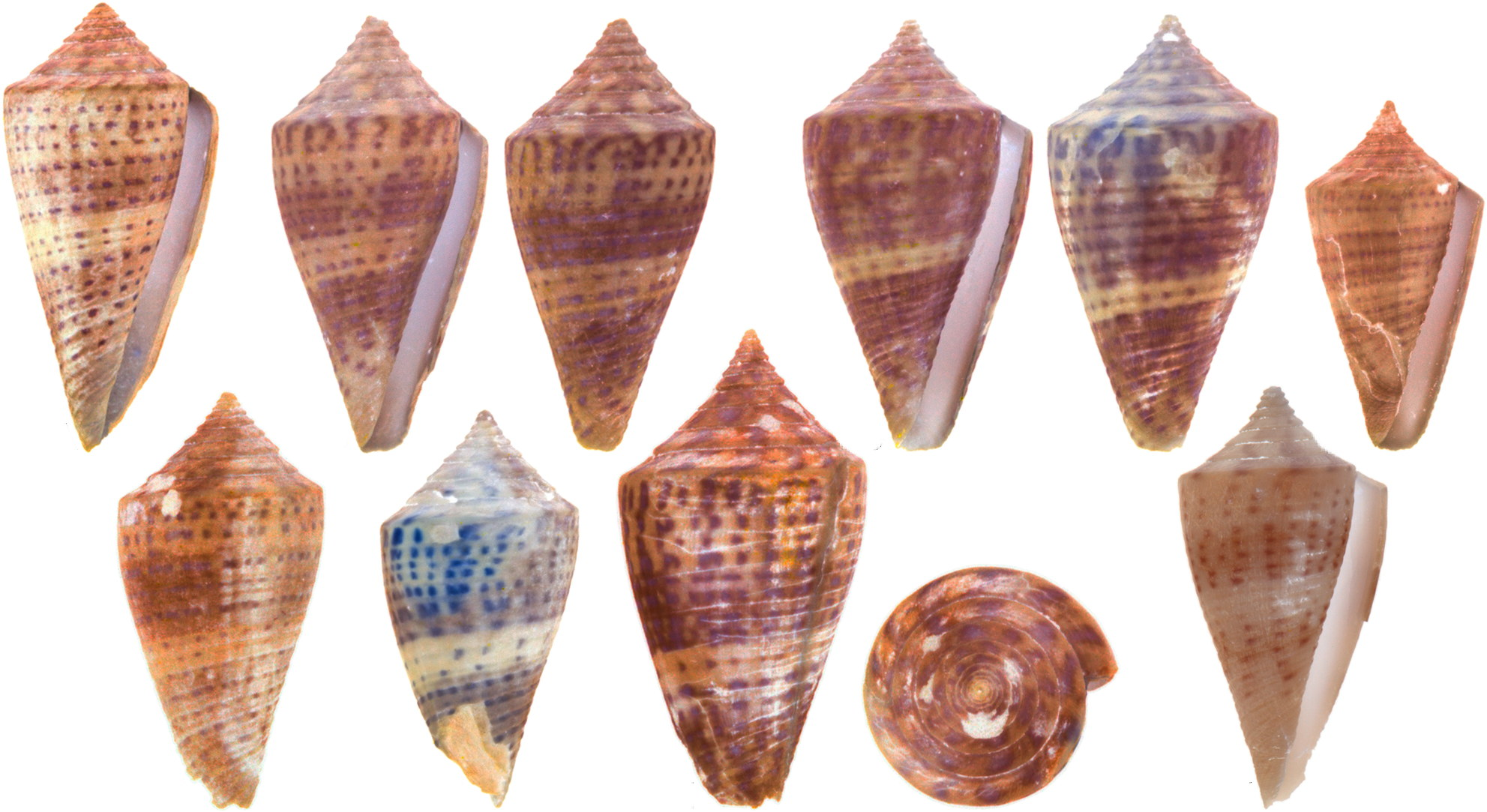
- Several shells of Conus planiliratus, seen as reversed images photographed under UV light

Conservation status
- Extinct (IUCN 3.1)

Scientific classification
- Kingdom: Animalia
- Phylum: Mollusca
- Class: Gastropoda
- Subclass: Caenogastropoda
- Order: Neogastropoda
- Superfamily: Conoidea
- Family: Conidae
- Genus: Conus
- Species: †C. planiliratus

Binomial name
- †Conus planiliratus G. B. Sowerby I, 1850

Synonyms
- † Conus (Dauciconus) planiliratus G. B. Sowerby I, 1850 · accepted, alternate representation

= Conus planiliratus =

Conus planiliratus Temporal range: Neogene

Species of sea snail

Conus planiliratus is an extinct species of sea snail, a marine gastropod mollusk in the family Conidae, the cone snails, cone shells or cones.

This species is not to be confounded with Conus planiliratus Sowerby, G.B. III, 1870, a synonym of Graphiconus inscriptus inscriptus maculospira (Pilsbry, H.A. & C.W. Johnson, 1922), itself a synonym of Conus inscriptus Reeve, 1843.

== Description ==
The size of the shell varies between 19 mm and 24 mm.

== Distribution ==
This species is only known as a fossil from the Neogene of the Dominican Republic.
