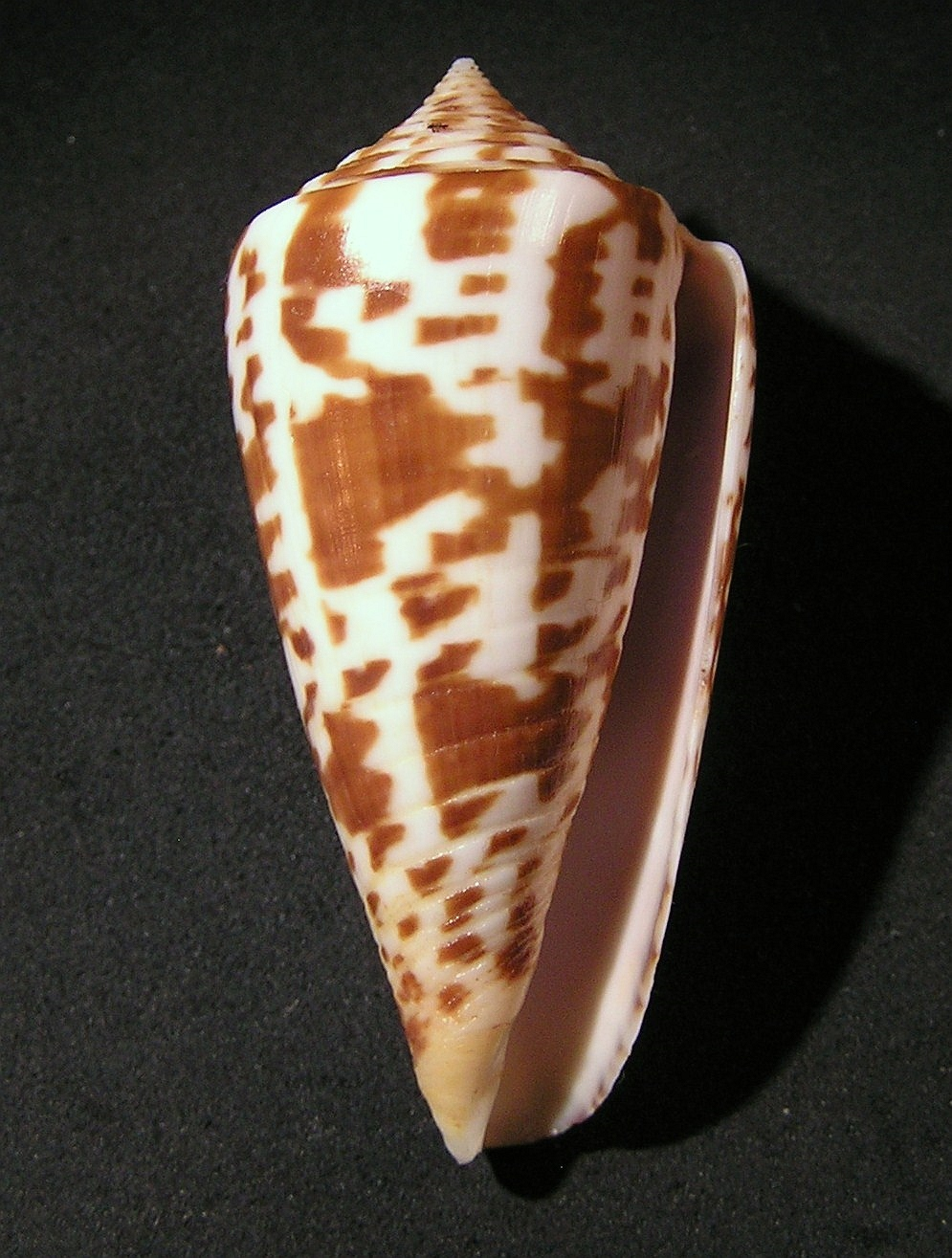
- Apertural view of Conus inscriptus

Scientific classification
- Kingdom: Animalia
- Phylum: Mollusca
- Class: Gastropoda
- Subclass: Caenogastropoda
- Order: Neogastropoda
- Superfamily: Conoidea
- Family: Conidae
- Genus: Conus
- Species: C. inscriptus

Binomial name
- Conus inscriptus Reeve, 1843

Synonyms
- Asprella inscripta (Reeve, 1843); Asprella inscripta adenensis E. A. Smith, 1891; Conus adenensis E. A. Smith, 1891; Conus cavailloni Fenaux, 1942; Conus cuneiformis E. A. Smith, 1877; Conus evansi Bondarev, 2001; Conus inscriptus f. meridionalis G. Raybaudi Massilia, 1989 (inavailable name: established as a form after 1960); Conus inscriptus indicus Röckel, 1979 (invalid: junior homonym of Conus magus var. indicus Weinkauff, 1874); Conus keatiformis Shikama, 1977; Conus keatii G. B. Sowerby II, 1858; Conus maculospira Pilsbry & Johnson, 1921; Conus maculospira Pilsbry, 1922; Conus maculospira bangladeshianus da Motta, 1985; † Conus planiliratus G. B. Sowerby I, 1850; Conus planiliratus G. B. Sowerby III, 1870(invalid: junior homonym of Conus planiliratus G.B. Sowerby I, 1850 (fossil);Conus maculospira is a replacement name); Conus planiliratus var. batheon Sutrany, 1904; Conus sartii Korn, Niederhöfer & Blöcher, 2001; Conus tegulatus G. B. Sowerby II, 1870; Conus (Phasmoconus) inscriptus Reeve, 1843 . accepted, alternative representation; Graphiconus cavailloni (Fenaux, 1942); Graphiconus inscriptus (Reeve, 1843)

= Conus inscriptus =

Species of sea snail

Conus inscriptus is a species of sea snail, a marine gastropod mollusk in the family Conidae, the cone snails and their allies.

Like all species within the genus Conus, these snails are predatory and venomous. They are capable of stinging humans, therefore live ones should be handled carefully or not at all.

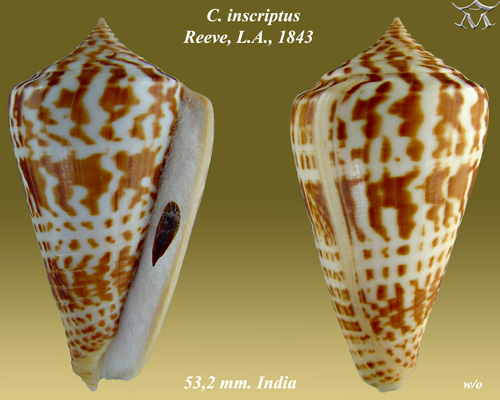
Conus inscriptus Reeve, L.A., 1843

== Description ==
The size of an adult shell varies between 32 mm and 65 mm. The shell is rather solid, smooth, grooved towards the base. Its color is ash-white, with dark chestnut hieroglyphic characters, interrupted by revolving series of spots in the middle and at the base.

== Distribution ==
This species occurs in the Red Sea and in the Indian Ocean off Madagascar and KwaZulu-Natal, South Africa; also found off Western Thailand and in the Aegean Sea (as an introduced alien)
