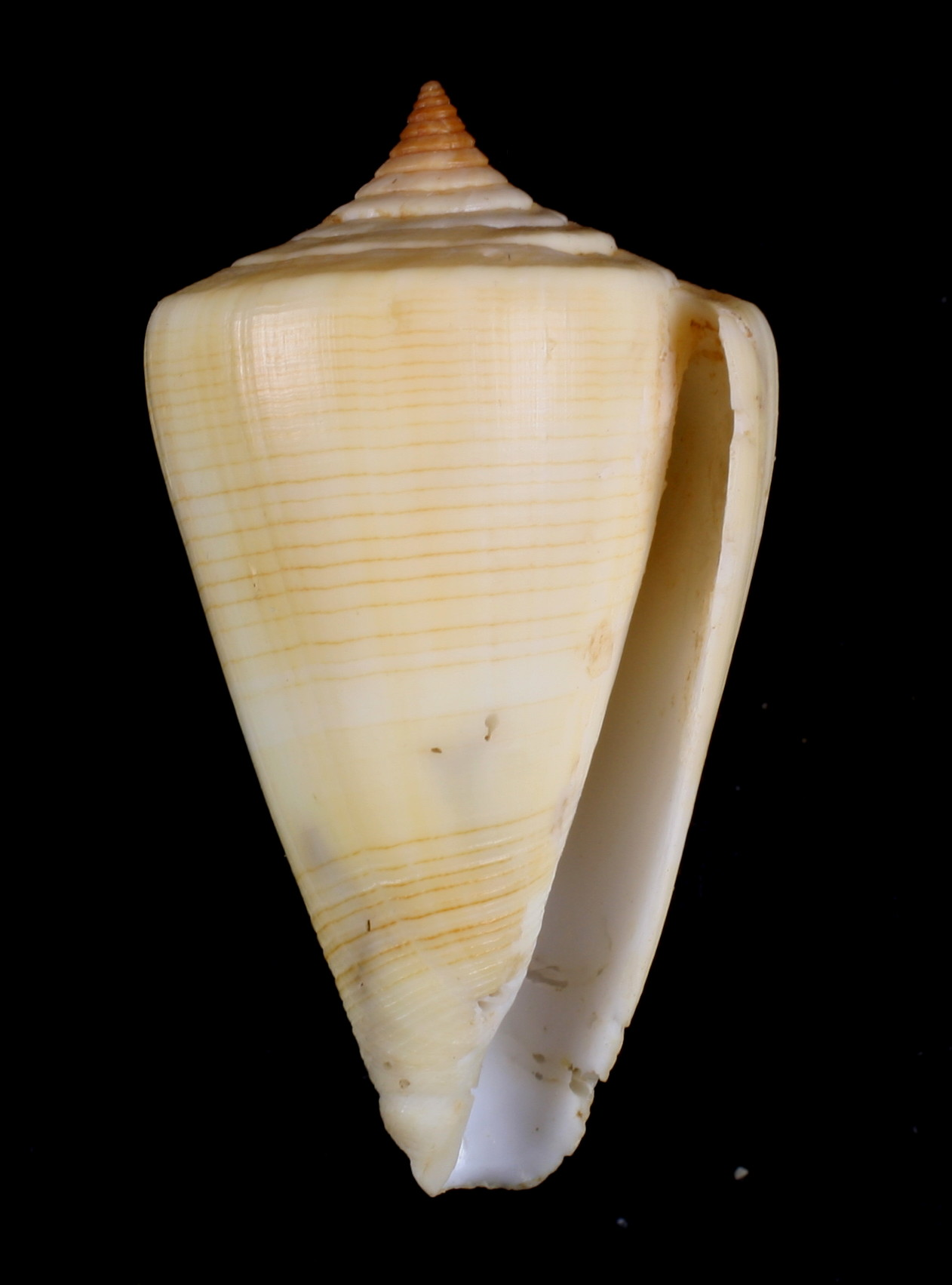
- Shell of Conus quercinus Lightfoot, 1786, measuring 47.9 mm in height, trawled at 40 m off Maputa, in Africa

Conservation status
- Least Concern (IUCN 3.1)

Scientific classification
- Kingdom: Animalia
- Phylum: Mollusca
- Class: Gastropoda
- Subclass: Caenogastropoda
- Order: Neogastropoda
- Superfamily: Conoidea
- Family: Conidae
- Genus: Conus
- Species: C. quercinus

Binomial name
- Conus quercinus [[[John Lightfoot (biologist)|Lightfoot]]], 1786 Conus quercinus [Lightfoot, 1786]. Retrieved through: World Register of Marine Species on 5 July 2011.

Synonyms
- Conus (Lividoconus) quercinus [Lightfoot], 1786 · accepted, alternate representation; Calamiconus jeffreyi Petuch & Sargent, 2011; Calamiconus quercinus Lightfoot, 1786; Cleobula albonerosa Garrard, 1966 (a synonym (form) of Conus quercinus Lightfoot, 1786); Conus akabensis G. B. Sowerby III, 1887 (synonym (colour form) of Conus quercinus); Conus cingulum Gmelin, 1791 (synonym of Conus quercinus); Conus egregius G. B. Sowerby III, 1914 (synonym of Conus quercinus); Conus fulvostriatus Fenaux, 1942 (synonym of Conus quercinus); Conus hepaticus Kiener, 1845 (synonym of Conus quercinus); Conus jeffreyi (Petuch & Sargent, 2011); Conus quercinus Hwass in Bruguière, 1792 (synonym of Conus quercinus); Conus quercinus var. albus Shaw, 1915 (synonym of Conus quercinus); Conus quercinus var. ponderosus G. B. Sowerby II, 1858 (synonym of Conus quercinus); Conus seurati Fenaux, 1942 (synonym of Conus quercinus) (nomen dubium)

= Conus quercinus =

Species of sea snail

Conus quercinus, common names the oak cone or the yellow cone, is a species of sea snail, a marine gastropod mollusk in the family Conidae, the cone snails and their allies.

Like all species within the genus Conus, these snails are predatory and venomous. They are capable of stinging humans, therefore live ones should be handled carefully or not at all.

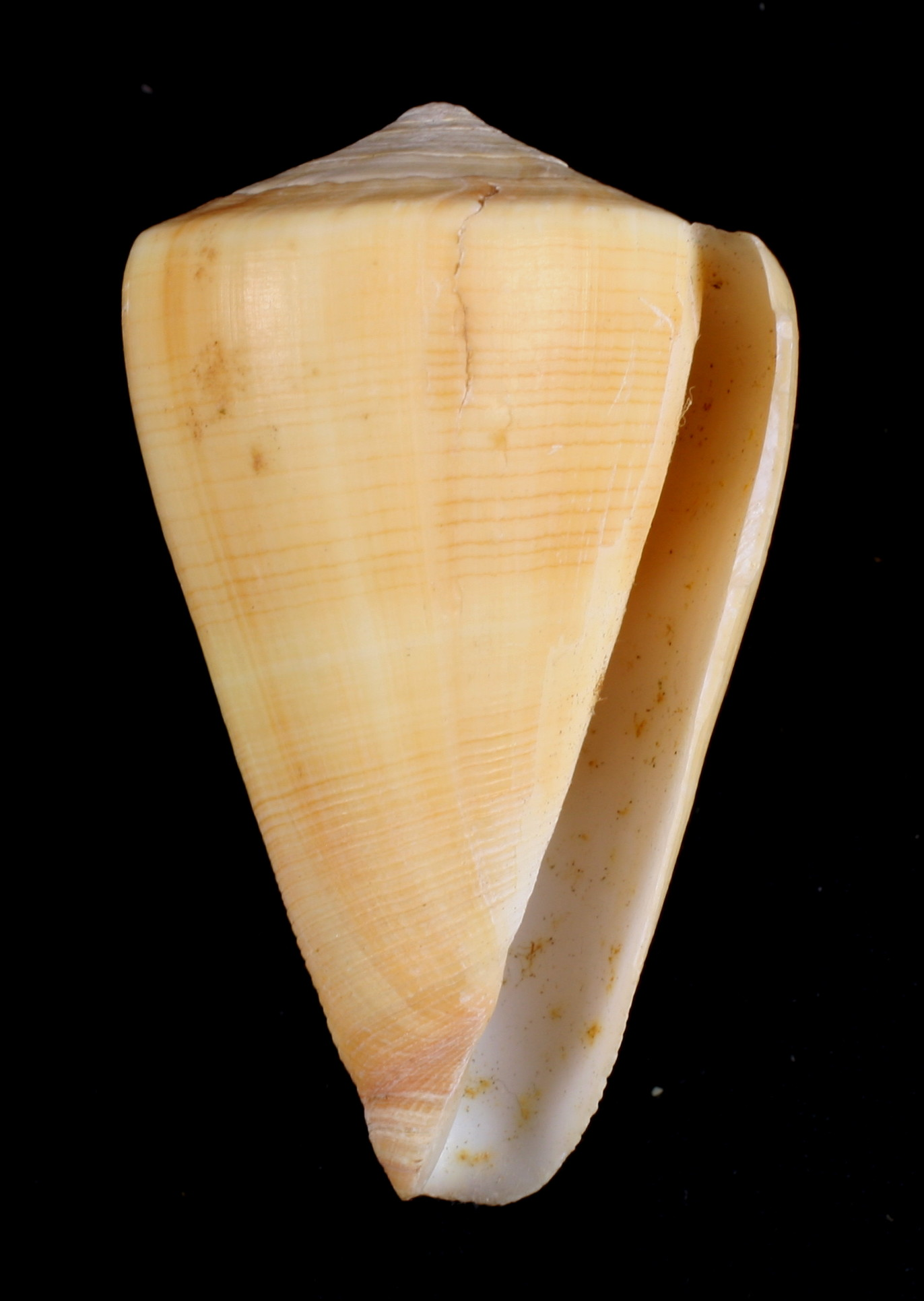
Shell of Conus quercinus [Lightfoot], 1786, measuring 61.0 mm in height, collected in New Zealand.

== Description ==
The size of the shell varies between 35 mm and 140 mm. The shell has a lemon-yellow color, with numerous fine, rather close, chestnut revolving lines. In old specimens the revolving lines become obsolete. The spire is rather elevated, with a concave outline. The shoulder of the body whorl is obtusely angulated.

== Distribution ==
This species occurs throughout the Indo-Pacific including Hawaii, Republic of the Marshall Islands, French Polynesia, Fiji, New Caledonia, in the Red Sea, in the Indian Ocean off Aldabra, Chagos, the Mascarene Basin, Madagascar and Mauritius; off Eastern India, the tropical Indo-West Pacific and off Australia (Northern Territory, Queensland, Western Australia).
