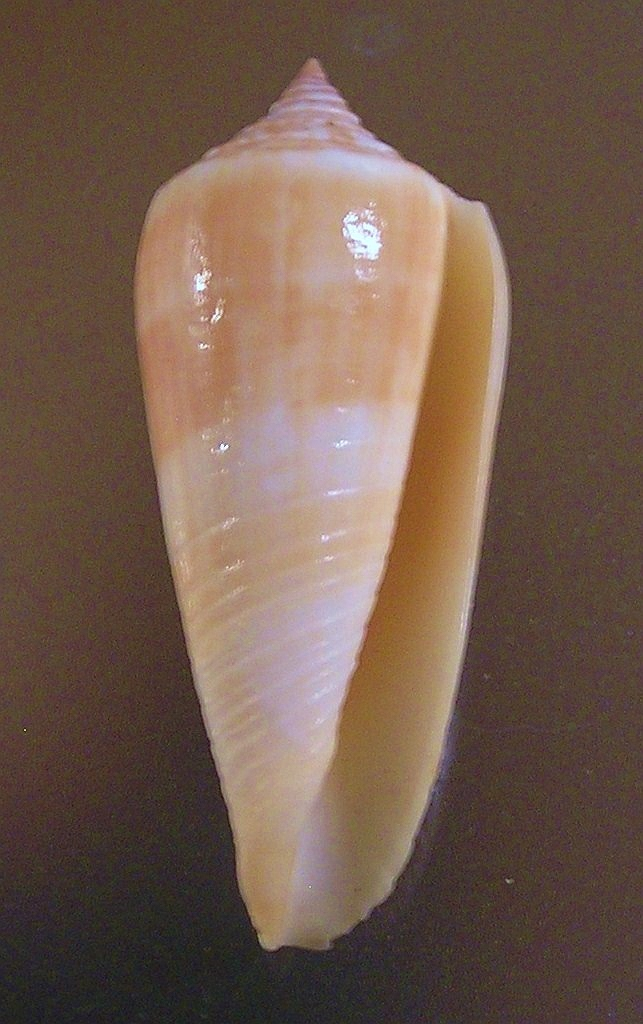
- Apertural view of a shell of Conus ochroleucus

Conservation status
- Least Concern (IUCN 3.1)

Scientific classification
- Domain: Eukaryota
- Kingdom: Animalia
- Phylum: Mollusca
- Class: Gastropoda
- Subclass: Caenogastropoda
- Order: Neogastropoda
- Superfamily: Conoidea
- Family: Conidae
- Genus: Conus
- Species: C. ochroleucus

Binomial name
- Conus ochroleucus Gmelin, 1791

Synonyms
- Asprella ochroleuca (Gmelin, 1791); Conus fasciatus G. B. Sowerby II, 1858; Conus ochroleucus ochroleucus Gmelin, 1791; Conus praefectus Hwass in Bruguière, 1792; Conus (Phasmoconus) ochroleucus Gmelin, 1791 · accepted, alternate representation; Cucullus eburneus Röding, 1798; Graphiconus ochroleucus (Gmelin, 1791)

= Conus ochroleucus =

Species of sea snail

Conus ochroleucus, common name the prefect cone, is a species of sea snail, a marine gastropod mollusk in the family Conidae, the cone snails and their allies.

Like all species within the genus Conus, these snails are predatory and venomous. They are capable of stinging humans, therefore live ones should be handled carefully or not at all.

Subspecies

- Conus ochroleucus ochroleucus Gmelin, 1791
- Conus ochroleucus tmetus Tomlin, 1937 (synonyms : Asprella ochroleuca tmetus (Tomlin, J.R. le B., 1937); Conus pilkeyi Petuch, 1974; Conus sulciferus A. Adams, 1855; Phasmoconus pilkeyi Petuch, E.J., 1974)

== Description ==
The size of an adult shell varies between 40mm and 88mm. The shell is long and narrow, distantly grooved towards the base. Its color is yellowish brown, variously shaded, with a rather indistinct median lighter band. The white aperture is somewhat wider anteriorly. The striate and acuminate spire is maculated with yellowish brown and white.

== Distribution ==
This species is found in the Pacific Ocean off Taiwan, the Philippines, Papua New Guinea, Indonesia and Fiji; in the Indian Ocean off India.

== Gallery ==
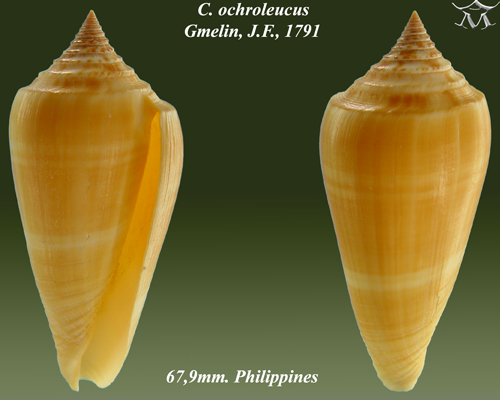
Conus ochroleucus Gmelin, J.F., 1791

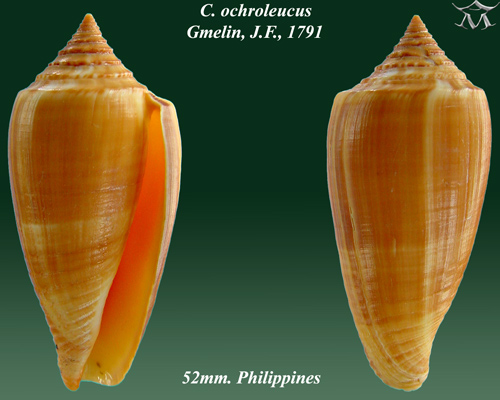
Conus ochroleucus Gmelin, J.F., 1791

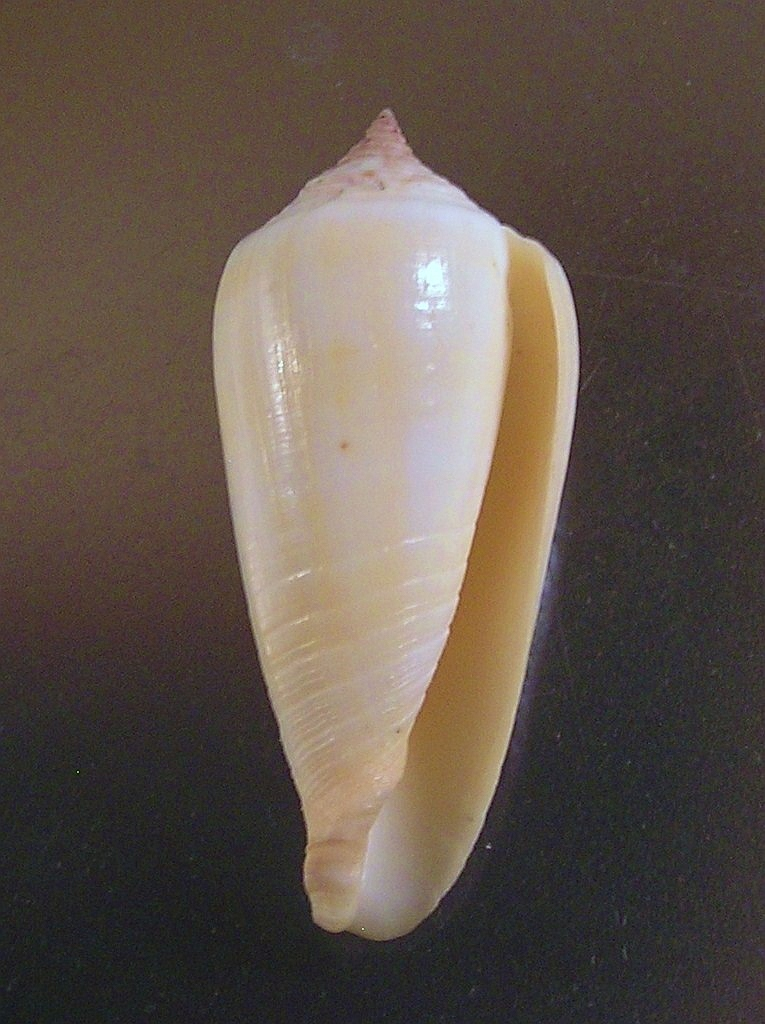
Apertural view of Conus ochroleucus tmetus
