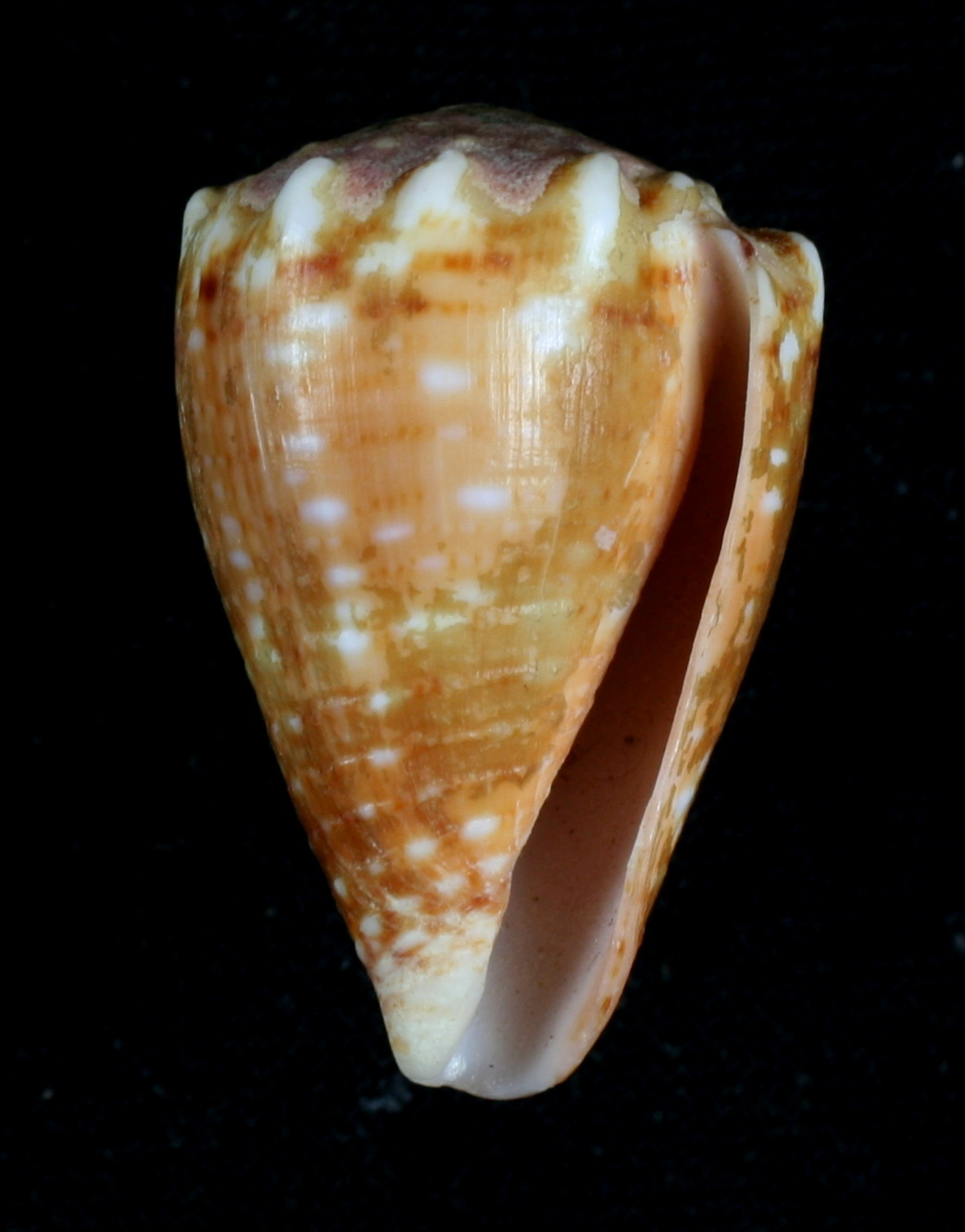
- shell of Conus tiaratus G. B. Sowerby I, 1833
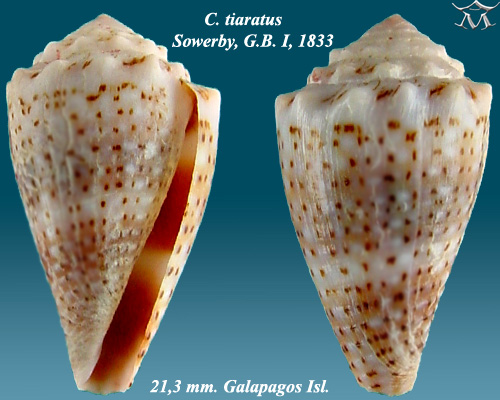

Conservation status
- Least Concern (IUCN 3.1)

Scientific classification
- Kingdom: Animalia
- Phylum: Mollusca
- Class: Gastropoda
- Subclass: Caenogastropoda
- Order: Neogastropoda
- Superfamily: Conoidea
- Family: Conidae
- Genus: Conus
- Species: C. tiaratus

Binomial name
- Conus tiaratus G. B. Sowerby I, 1833

Synonyms
- Conus (Virroconus) tiaratus G. B. Sowerby I, 1833 · accepted, alternate representation; Miliariconus tiaratus (G. B. Sowerby I, 1833)

= Conus tiaratus =

Species of sea snail

Conus tiaratus, common name the tiara cone, is a species of sea snail, a marine gastropod mollusk in the family Conidae, the cone snails and their relatives.

Like all species within the genus Conus, these snails are predatory and venomous. They are capable of stinging humans, therefore live ones should be handled carefully or not at all.

== Description ==
The size of the shell varies between 15mm and 39mm. The shell itself is conical, resembling a conch shell. It is either white with orange spots or orange with white spots, with a white interior.

== Conservation status ==
According to the IUCN analysis conducted in 2011, it is classified as "least concern."

== Distribution ==
This species occurs in the Pacific Ocean, predominantly found in the Eastern Pacific from Southern Mexico to Peru; off the Galapagos Islands.

== Sources ==
- Bartsch, P. & Rehder, H. A. 1939. Smithson. Misc. Collns. 98 (10): 1, plate 1, figure 4,7.
- Petit, R. E. (2009). "George Brettingham Sowerby, I, II & III: their conchological publications and molluscan taxa" (PDF). Zootaxa. 2189: 1–218. doi:10.11646/zootaxa.2189.1.1.
- Puillandre, N.; Duda, T.F.; Meyer, C.; Olivera, B.M.; Bouchet, P. (2015). "One, four or 100 genera? A new classification of the cone snails". Journal of Molluscan Studies. 81 (1): 1–23. doi:10.1093/mollus/eyu055. PMC 4541476. PMID 26300576.
