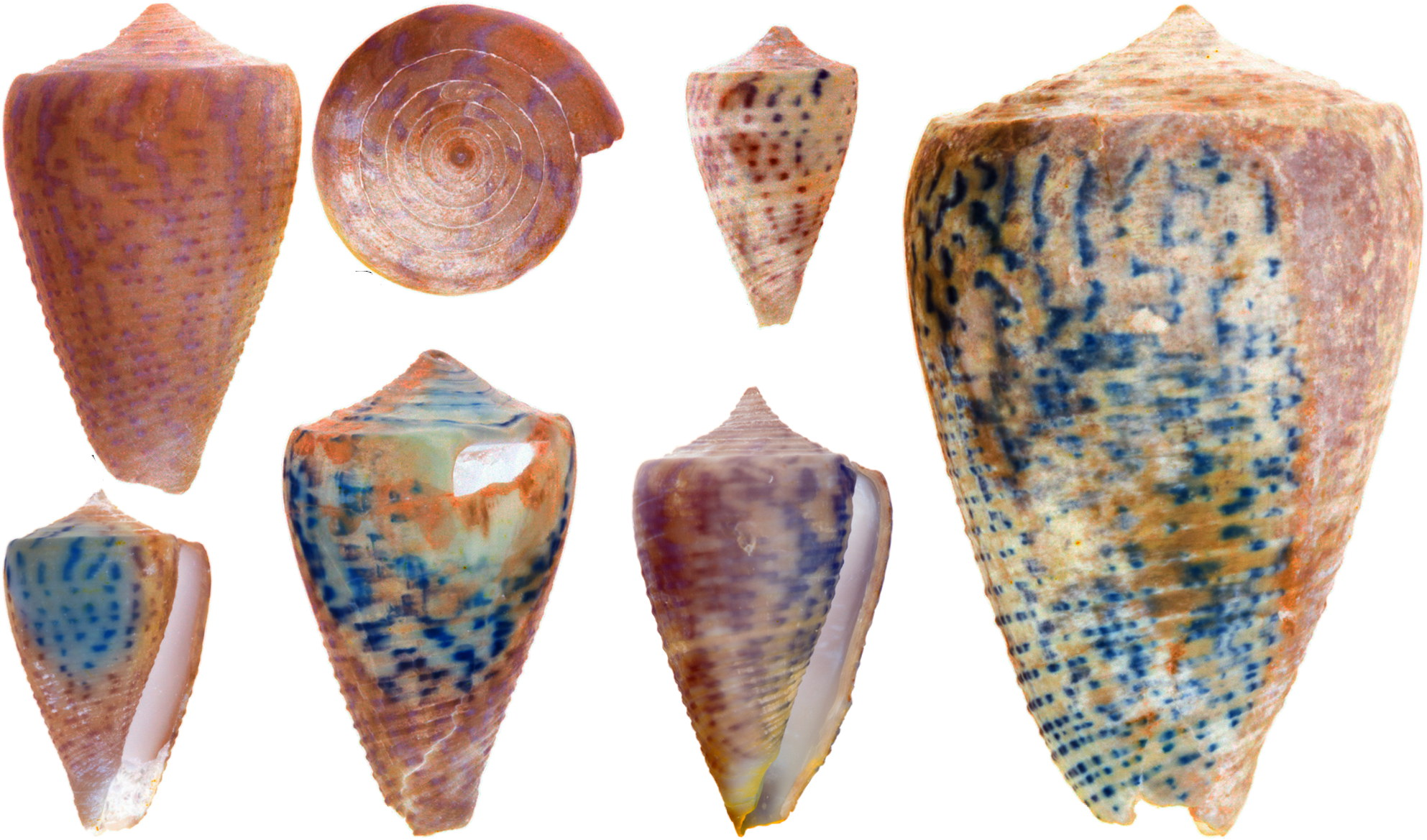
- Several specimens of a shell of Conus symmetricus; all images are reversed images of specimens photographed under UV light

Conservation status
- Extinct (IUCN 3.1)

Scientific classification
- Kingdom: Animalia
- Phylum: Mollusca
- Class: Gastropoda
- Subclass: Caenogastropoda
- Order: Neogastropoda
- Superfamily: Conoidea
- Family: Conidae
- Genus: Conus
- Species: †C. symmetricus

Binomial name
- †Conus symmetricus G. B. Sowerby I, 1850

Synonyms
- † Conus (Leptoconus) symmetricus Sowerby I, Pflug, 1961; † Purpuriconus symmetricus (Sowerby I), Tucker and Tenorio, 2009

= Conus symmetricus =

Conus symmetricus Temporal range: Neogene

Species of sea snail

Conus symmetricus is an extinct species of sea snail, a marine gastropod mollusk in the family Conidae, the cone snails, cone shells or cones with a wide range of color and patterns.

== Description ==
The size of the shell varies between 17 mm and 46 mm. While consistent in the morph of the shell, specimens of Conus symmetricus show a wide range of color and pattern variation with a distinctive shell shape. Two general types include a base pattern which consists of irregularly-shaped streaks or spots that cover a great portion of the last whorl. The secondary pattern consists of about 17–20 spiral rows of dots that correspond with beaded spiral ribs on the basal two-thirds of the last whorl. The two patterns are slightly different in the color of emitted light. The second general type consists of a base pattern with three weakly-pigmented, discontinuous spiral bands. The secondary pattern includes about 20 spiral rows of dots, which sometimes come together near the shoulder to form streaks. The two patterns also are slightly different in the color of emitted light.

== Distribution ==
Conus symmetricus is a common species, especially in the Gurabo. This marine species is only known as a fossil from the Neogene of the Dominican Republic.
