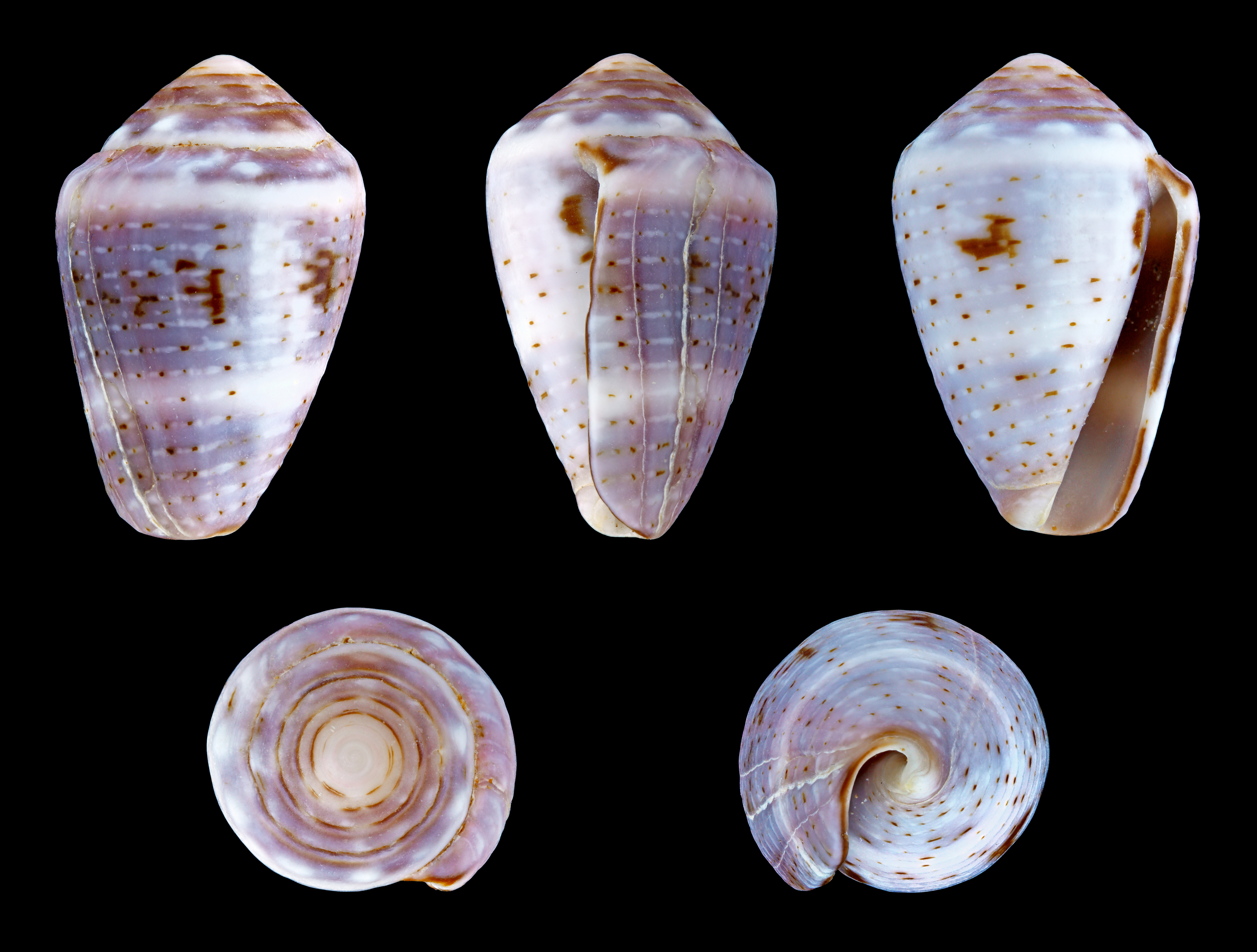
- Five views of a shell of Conus coronatus Gmelin, J.F., 1791

Conservation status
- Least Concern (IUCN 3.1)

Scientific classification
- Kingdom: Animalia
- Phylum: Mollusca
- Class: Gastropoda
- Subclass: Caenogastropoda
- Order: Neogastropoda
- Superfamily: Conoidea
- Family: Conidae
- Genus: Conus
- Species: C. coronatus

Binomial name
- Conus coronatus Gmelin, 1791

Synonyms
- Conus (Virroconus) coronatus Gmelin, 1791 accepted, alternate representation; Conus coronalis Roding, 1798; Conus minimus var. condoriana Crosse & Fischer, 1864; Conus multibandatus Bozzetti, 2017; Conus parvus Gebauer, 1802; Conus virgineus Link, 1807; Cucullus coronalis Röding, 1798; Miliariconus coronatus (Gmelin, 1791)

= Conus coronatus =

Species of sea snail

Conus coronatus, common name the crowned cone or the coronated cone, is a species of sea snail, a marine gastropod mollusk in the family Conidae, the cone snails and their allies.

Like all species within the genus Conus, these snails are predatory and venomous. They are capable of stinging humans, therefore live ones should be handled carefully or not at all.

== Description ==
The size of the small, squat heavy shell varies between 15 mm and 47 mm. It contains slight nodules on the shoulders of whorls. The colour is light, mottled pinkish-blue with brown dots and blotches. The aperture is purple-brown.

== Distribution ==
This marine species occurs in the Red Sea, in the Indian Ocean off Madagascar, Chagos, the Mascarene Basin and Aldabra; in the tropical Indo-West Pacific; off New Zealand and Australia (New South Wales, the Northern Territory, Queensland and Western Australia).

== Habitat ==
This species can be found in shallow water, often under boulders.
