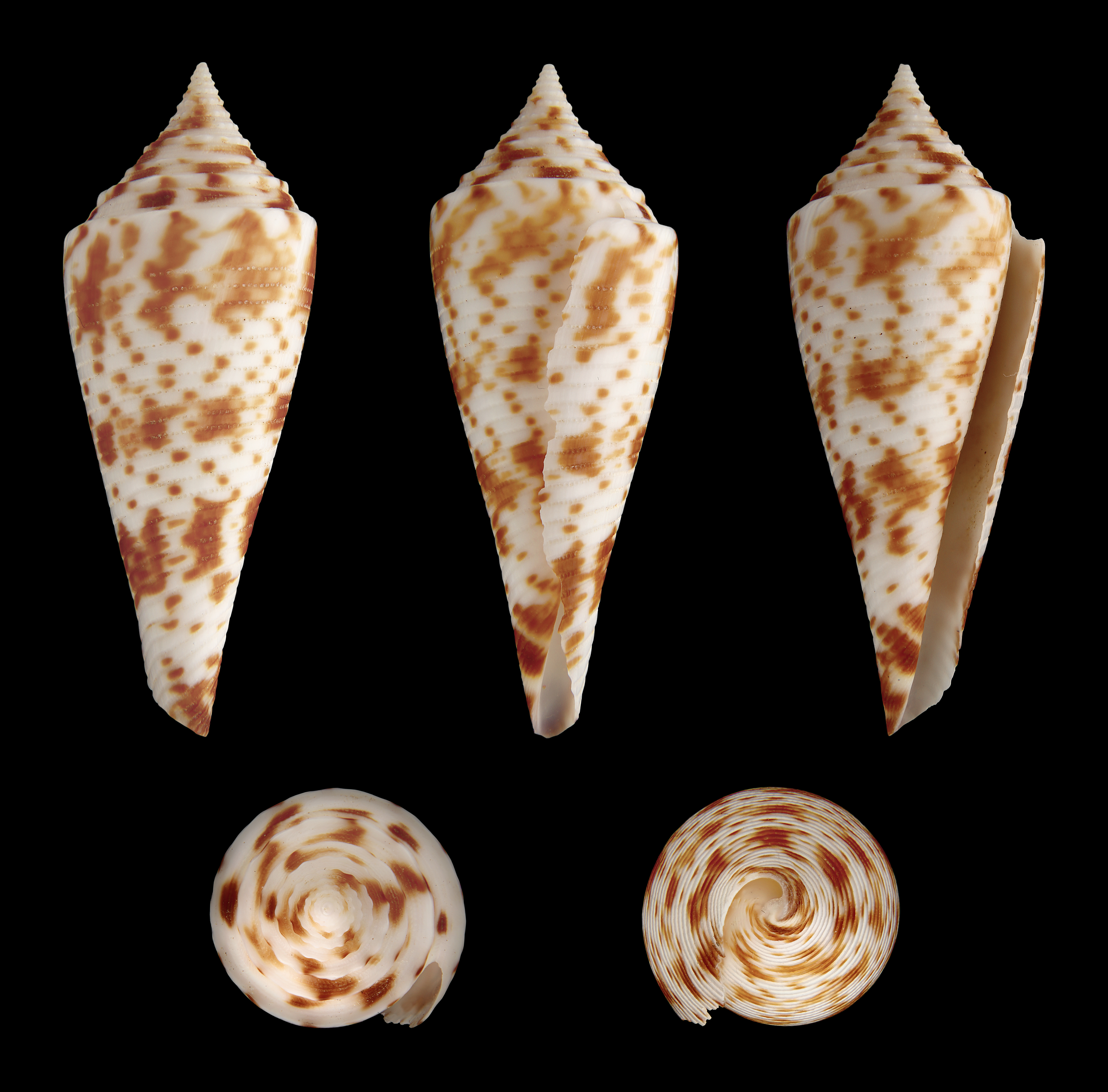
- Shell of Conasprella comatosa

Conservation status
- Least Concern (IUCN 3.1)

Scientific classification
- Kingdom: Animalia
- Phylum: Mollusca
- Class: Gastropoda
- Subclass: Caenogastropoda
- Order: Neogastropoda
- Superfamily: Conoidea
- Family: Conidae
- Genus: Conasprella
- Species: C. comatosa

Binomial name
- Conasprella comatosa (Pilsbry, 1904)

Synonyms
- Bathyconus comatosus (Pilsbry, 1904); Conasprella (Fusiconus) comatosa (Pilsbry, 1904) · accepted, alternate representation; Conus comatosa Pilsbry, 1904 (original combination); Conus dormitor Pilsbry, H.A. 1904; Conus elegans Schepman, 1913 (invalid: junior homonym of Conus elegans G.B. Sowerby III, 1895; Conus schepmani is a replacement name); Conus schepmani Fulton, 1936

= Conasprella comatosa =

Species of gastropod

Conasprella comatosa, common name comatose cone, is a species of sea snail, a marine gastropod mollusk in the family Conidae, the cone snails and their allies.

Like all species within the genus Conasprella, these snails are predatory and venomous. They are capable of stinging humans, therefore live ones should be handled carefully or not at all.

== Description ==
The size of the shell varies between 20 mm and 60 mm.

== Distribution ==
This species occurs in the Pacific Ocean off Japan, the Philippines, Northwest Australia, New Caledonia and the Solomon Islands.
