= C. kermadecensis =

C. kermadecensis may refer to:

- Calliphora kermadecensis, a synonym for Calliphora hilli, a fly species
- Conus kermadecensis, a synonym for Conus lischkeanus, a sea snail species
- Cyathea kermadecensis, a tree fern species endemic to Raoul Island in the Kermadec Islands
