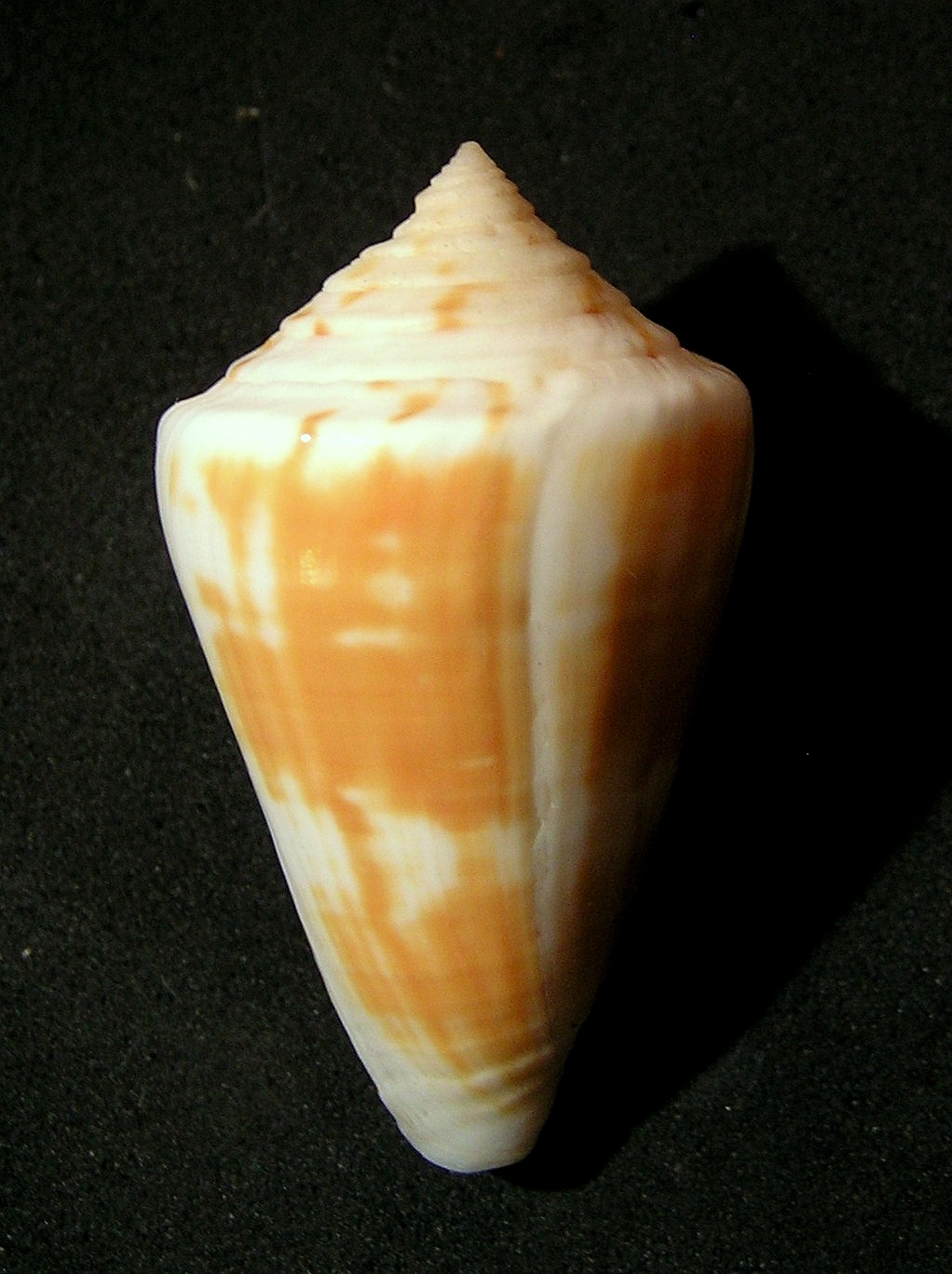
- Abapertural view of a shell of Conus kermadecensis

Scientific classification
- Kingdom: Animalia
- Phylum: Mollusca
- Class: Gastropoda
- Subclass: Caenogastropoda
- Order: Neogastropoda
- Superfamily: Conoidea
- Family: Conidae
- Genus: Conus
- Species: C. kermadecensis

Binomial name
- Conus kermadecensis Iredale, 1912

Synonyms
- Calamiconus kermadecensis (Iredale, 1912); Conus (Lividoconus) kermadecensis Iredale, 1912 · accepted, alternate representation

= Conus kermadecensis =

Species of sea snail

Conus kermadecensis, common name the Kermadec cone, is a species of sea snail, a marine gastropod mollusk in the family Conidae, the cone snails and their allies.

Like all species within the genus Conus, these snails are predatory and venomous. They are capable of stinging humans, therefore live ones should be handled carefully or not at all.

== Description ==
The size of the shell varies between 25 mm and 60 mm.

== Distribution ==
This marine species is endemic to New Zealand, occurring off the Kermadec Islands.
