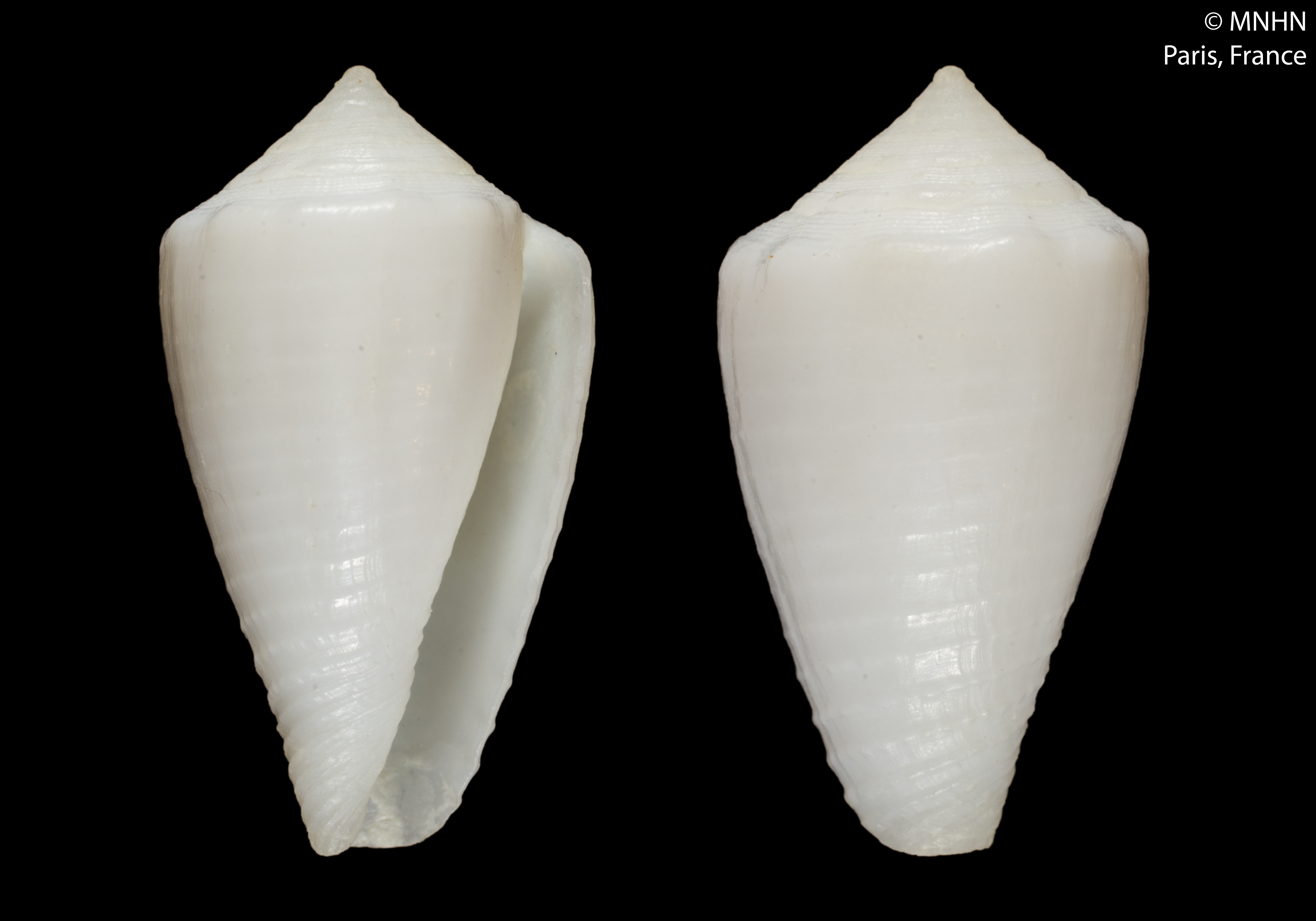
- Shell of Conus dedonderi (holotype at MNHN, Paris)

Scientific classification
- Kingdom: Animalia
- Phylum: Mollusca
- Class: Gastropoda
- Subclass: Caenogastropoda
- Order: Neogastropoda
- Superfamily: Conoidea
- Family: Conidae
- Genus: Conus
- Species: C. dedonderi

Binomial name
- Conus dedonderi (Goethaels & D. Monsecour, 2013)

Synonyms
- Conus (Strategoconus) dedonderi (Goethaels & D. Monsecour, 2013) accepted, alternate representation; Rolaniconus dedonderi Goethaels & D. Monsecour, 2013

= Conus dedonderi =

Species of sea snail

Conus dedonderi is a species of sea snail, a marine gastropod mollusk in the family Conidae, the cone snails, cone shells or cones.

These snails are predatory and venomous. They are capable of stinging humans.

== Classification and Nomenclature ==
Conus dedonderi was originally described as Rolaniconus dedonderi by Goethaels and Monsecour in 2013. It is now classified under the genus Conus, specifically within the subgenus Strategoconus.

== Description ==
The shell of C. Dedonderi is a small, white, rigid, cone like shape which can vary between 14 mm to 20 mm in length.

== Distribution ==
This marine species occurs off the Southern Philippines.
