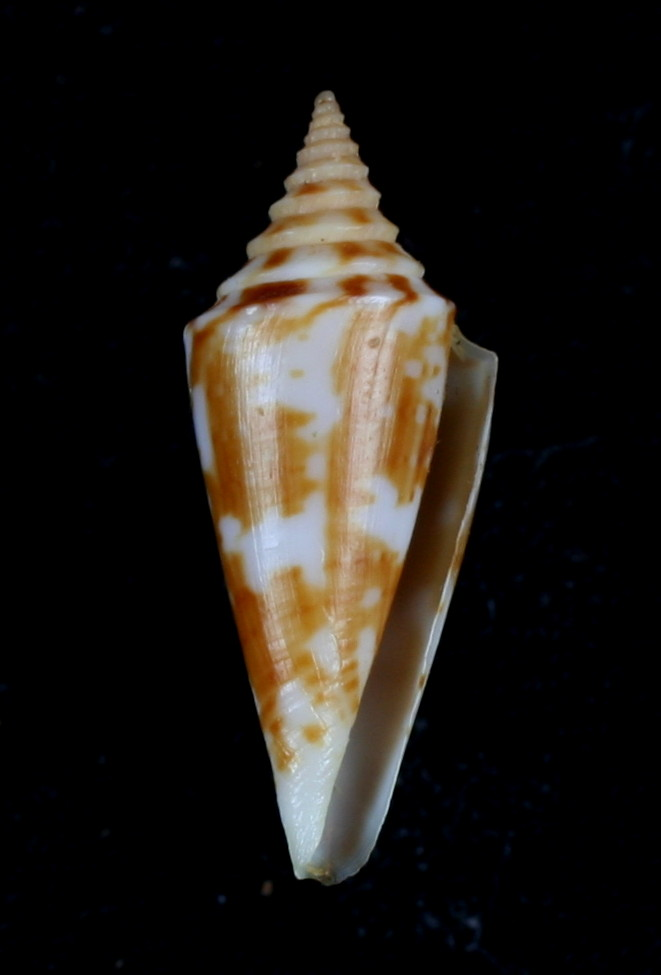
- Apertural view of shell of Conus scalarissimus da Motta, 1988.

Scientific classification
- Kingdom: Animalia
- Phylum: Mollusca
- Class: Gastropoda
- Subclass: Caenogastropoda
- Order: Neogastropoda
- Superfamily: Conoidea
- Family: Conidae
- Genus: Conus
- Species: C. scalarissimus

Binomial name
- Conus scalarissimus da Motta, 1988

Synonyms
- Conus (Dauciconus) scalarissimus da Motta, 1988 · accepted, alternate representation; Conus gradatus Reeve, 1843 (invalid: junior homonym of Conus gradatus W. Wood, 1828); Gradiconus scalarissimus (da Motta, 1988)

= Conus scalarissimus =

Species of sea snail

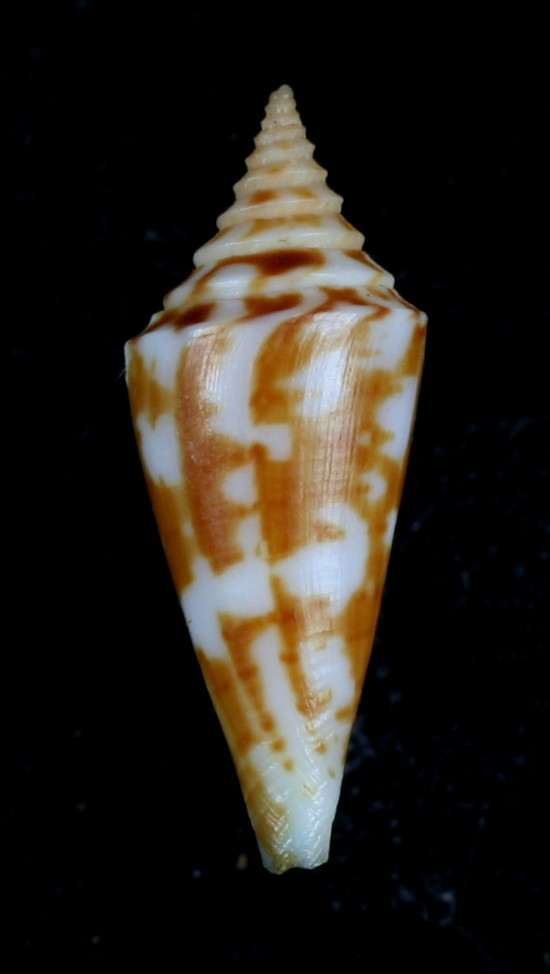
Abapertural view of shell of Conus scalarissimus da Motta, 1988.

Conus scalarissimus is a species of sea snail, a marine gastropod mollusk in the family Conidae, the cone snails and their allies.

Like all species within the genus Conus, these marine snails are predatory and venomous. They are capable of stinging humans, so live ones should be handled carefully, or not at all.

== Description ==
The size of an adult shell varies between 30 mm and 60 mm.

== Distribution ==
This species occurs in the Pacific Ocean between the Gulf of California, Western Mexico, and Peru
