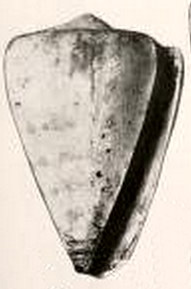
- Drawing of a shell of Conus humerosus

Scientific classification
- Kingdom: Animalia
- Phylum: Mollusca
- Class: Gastropoda
- Subclass: Caenogastropoda
- Order: Neogastropoda
- Superfamily: Conoidea
- Family: Conidae
- Genus: Conus
- Species: C. humerosus

Binomial name
- Conus humerosus Pilsbry, 1921

Synonyms
- † Conus (Spuriconus) humerosus Pilsbry, 1921 · accepted, alternate representation; † Conus proteus humerosus Pilsbry, 1921 (original rank)

= Conus humerosus =

Species of Gastropoda

Conus humerosus is a fossil species of sea snail, a marine gastropod mollusk in the family Conidae, the cone snails, cone shells or cones.

== Description ==
The size of the shell attains 65 mm.

== Distribution ==
This marine species is only found as a fossil in the Neogene of the Dominican Republic.

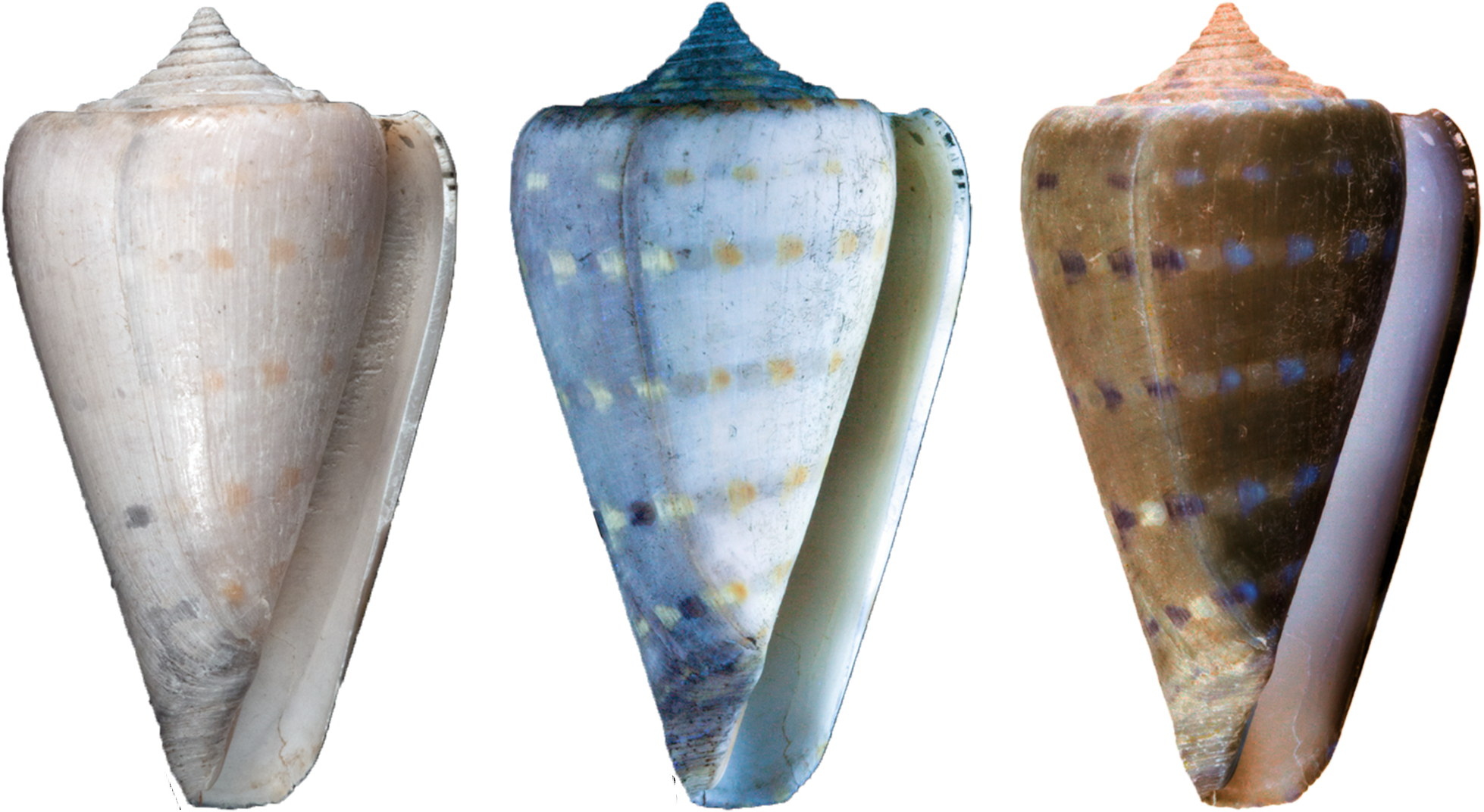
Conus humerosus; Correspondence between oxidation of the shell, fluorescence under UV light, and effects of digitally reversing the image of the fluorescing shell using photoediting software
