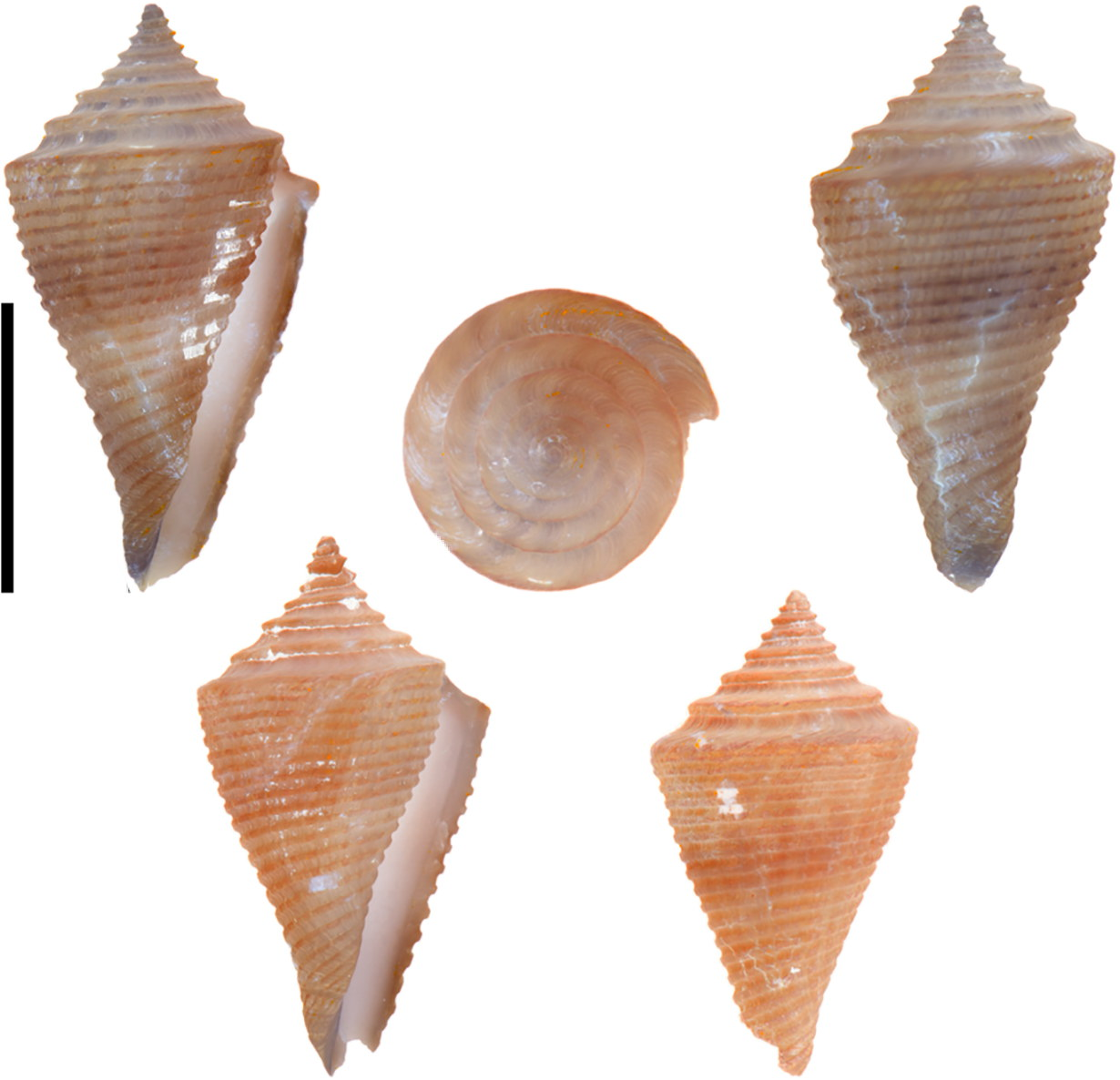
- Several specimens of Conus multiliratus; all images are reversed image of specimens photographed under UV light.

Scientific classification
- Kingdom: Animalia
- Phylum: Mollusca
- Class: Gastropoda
- Subclass: Caenogastropoda
- Order: Neogastropoda
- Superfamily: Conoidea
- Family: Conidae
- Genus: Conus
- Species: C. multiliratus

Binomial name
- Conus multiliratus Böse, 1906

Synonyms
- † Conus (Dauciconus) multiliratus Böse, 1906 · accepted, alternate representation; † Conus agassizii multiliratus Böse, 1906 (original rank); † Conus gaza Johnson & Pilsbry, 1911; † Conasprelloides multiliratus (Böse), Tucker and Tenorio, 2009

= Conus multiliratus =

Species of sea snail

Conus multiliratus is an extinct species of sea snail, a marine gastropod mollusk in the family Conidae, the cone snails, cone shells or cones.

== Description ==
The size of the shell varies between 16.7 mm and 20.2 mm.

== Distribution ==
This marine species of cone snail is found as a fossil from the Middle Miocene and Tertiary in Mexico, Panama and Colombia; in the Neogene of the Dominican Republic.
