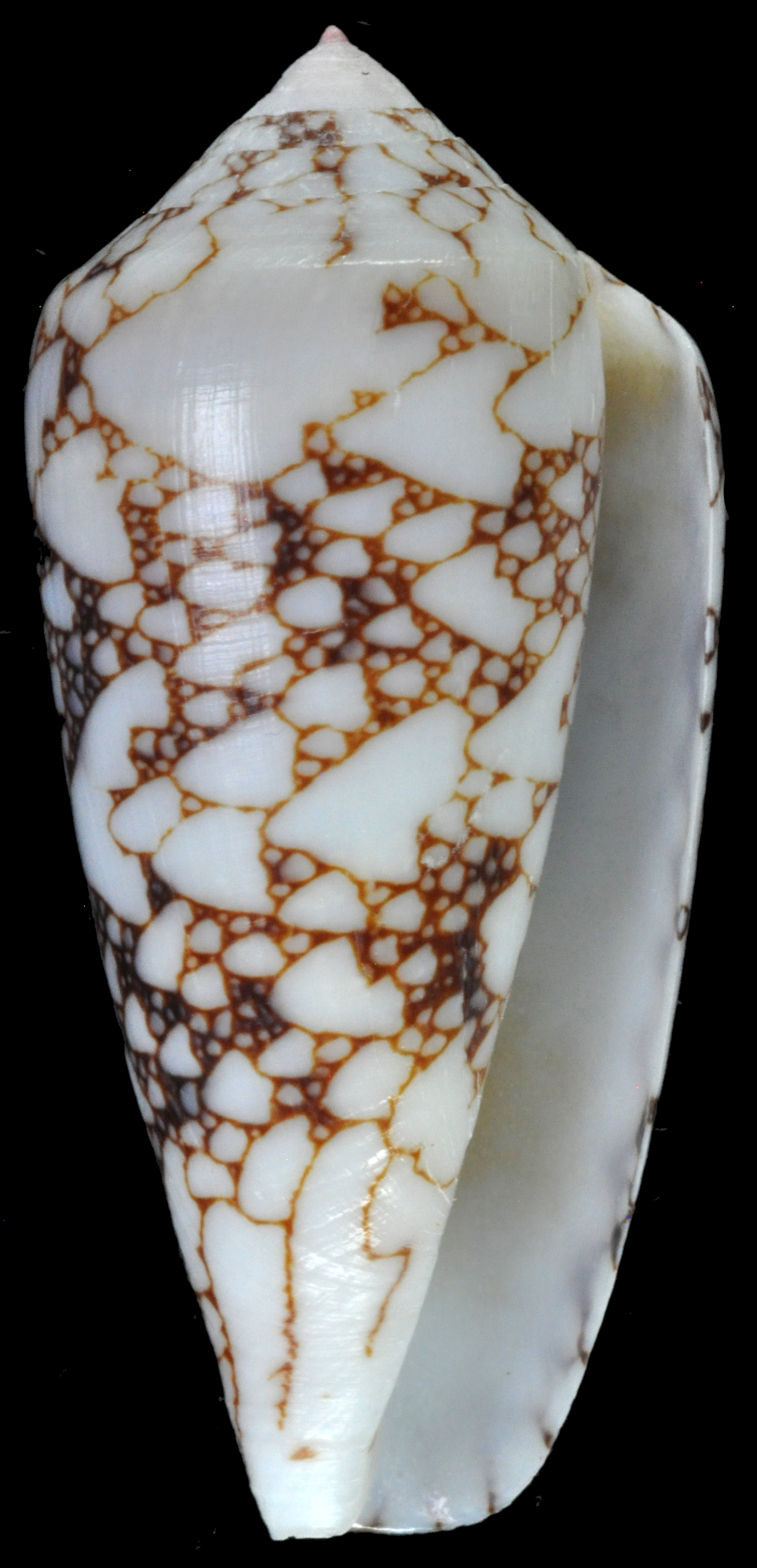
- Shell of Conus brandonensis (holotype at the National Museum of Natural History in France)

Scientific classification
- Kingdom: Animalia
- Phylum: Mollusca
- Class: Gastropoda
- Subclass: Caenogastropoda
- Order: Neogastropoda
- Family: Conidae
- Genus: Conus
- Species: C. brandonensis

Binomial name
- Conus brandonensis (Lorenz, 2019)

Synonyms
- Darioconus brandonensis Lorenz, 2019

= Conus brandonensis =

Species of sea snail

Conus brandonensis is a species of small sea snail, a marine gastropod mollusc in the family Conidae.

== Description ==
The shell is around 38 mm in length and white in color. The body whorl is conoid and cylindrical, and slightly convex. The early teleoconch whorls are domed, the sutural ramp of the body whorl is flattened, and the shoulder is subangulate. The protoconch is pointed, 0.4 mm in height and 0.6 mm in width. It contains three whorls, with a smooth body whorl. The shell has a narrow aperture that widens towards the anterior. The shell also has a shallow anal notch.

== Distribution ==
This species is found in the Indo-Pacific area, in shallow water under coral slabs in sandy areas.
