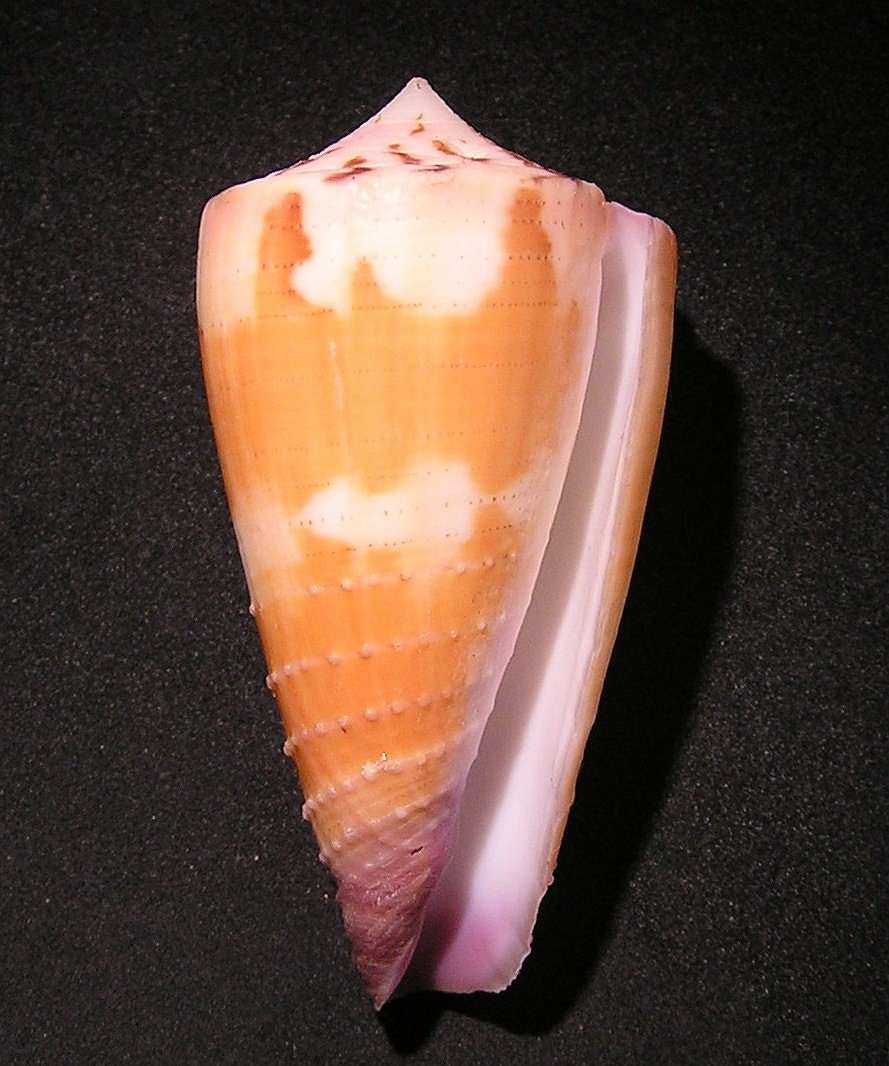
- Apertural view of Conus circumactus

Conservation status
- Least Concern (IUCN 3.1)

Scientific classification
- Kingdom: Animalia
- Phylum: Mollusca
- Class: Gastropoda
- Subclass: Caenogastropoda
- Order: Neogastropoda
- Superfamily: Conoidea
- Family: Conidae
- Genus: Conus
- Species: C. circumactus

Binomial name
- Conus circumactus Iredale, 1929

Synonyms
- Conus (Strategoconus) circumactus Iredale, 1929 accepted, alternate representation; Conus cinctus Swainson, 1822 (invalid: junior homonym of Conus cinctus Bosc, 1801; C. circumactus is a replacement name); Conus hammatus Bartsch & Rehder, 1943; Conus laevis Gmelin, 1791; Conus pulchellus Swainson, 1822; Rhizoconus hammatus Bartsch, P. & H.A. Rehder, 1943; Vituliconus circumactus Iredale, 1929

= Conus circumactus =

Species of sea snail

Conus circumactus is a species of sea snail, a marine gastropod mollusk in the family Conidae, the cone snails and their allies.

Like all species within the genus Conus, these snails are predatory and venomous. They are capable of stinging humans, therefore live ones should be handled carefully or not at all.

== Description ==
The size of an adult shell varies between 35 mm and 75 mm. The smooth shell is rather thin. The spire is low-conical and contains revolving striae, usually maculated with chestnut. The body whorl is striate below. The color of the shell is yellowish or light chestnut, with large white blotches forming a band at the shoulder and another on the middle, encircled by narrow chestnut lines, which are often broken up into small dots . The color of the base and the aperture is usually violaceous. In Conus cinctus, Swainson 1822, the narrow chestnut lines are continuous, the white blotches and interior of aperture are more or less suffused with rose-color.

== Distribution ==
This species occurs in the tropical Indo-Pacific and off Australia (Queensland)
