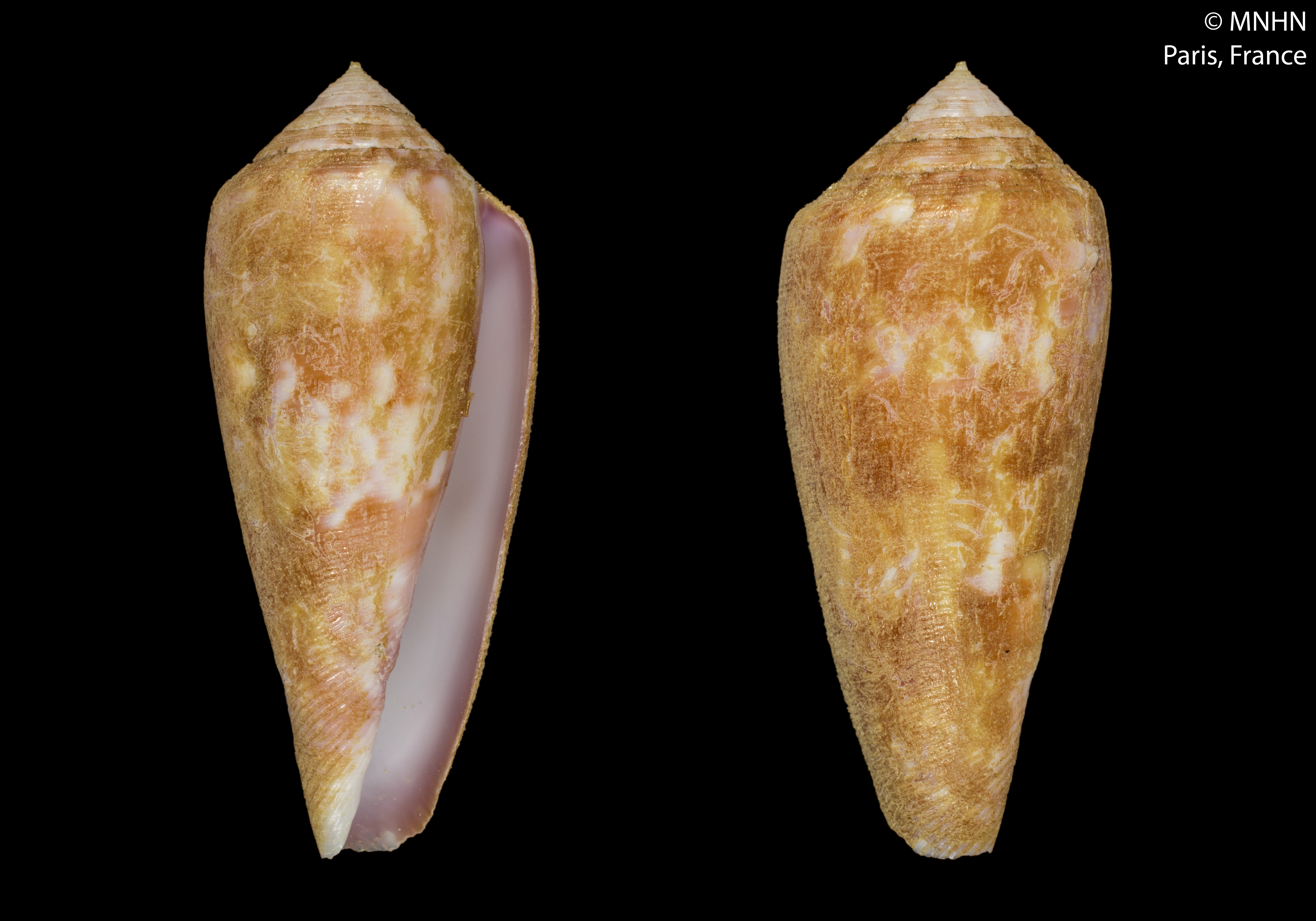
- Shell of Conus crosnieri (holotype at MNHN, Paris)

Scientific classification
- Kingdom: Animalia
- Phylum: Mollusca
- Class: Gastropoda
- Subclass: Caenogastropoda
- Order: Neogastropoda
- Superfamily: Conoidea
- Family: Conidae
- Genus: Conus
- Species: C. crosnieri

Binomial name
- Conus crosnieri (Tenorio, Monnier & Puillandre, 2018)

Synonyms
- Afonsoconus crosnieri Tenorio, Monnier & Puillandre, 2018; Conus (Afonsoconus) crosnieri (Tenorio, Monnier & Puillandre, 2018)

= Conus crosnieri =

Species of sea snail

Conus crosnieri is a species of sea snail, a marine gastropod mollusk, in the family Conidae, the cone snails and their allies.

== Description ==
The length of the shell attains 59.6 mm, its diameter is 24.8 mm. The maximum length of the dredged species is 83.8 mm.

== Distribution ==
The holotype of this marine species was found in the Mozambique Channel off the Comores and also off Madagascar and S KwaZulu-Natal, South Africa.
