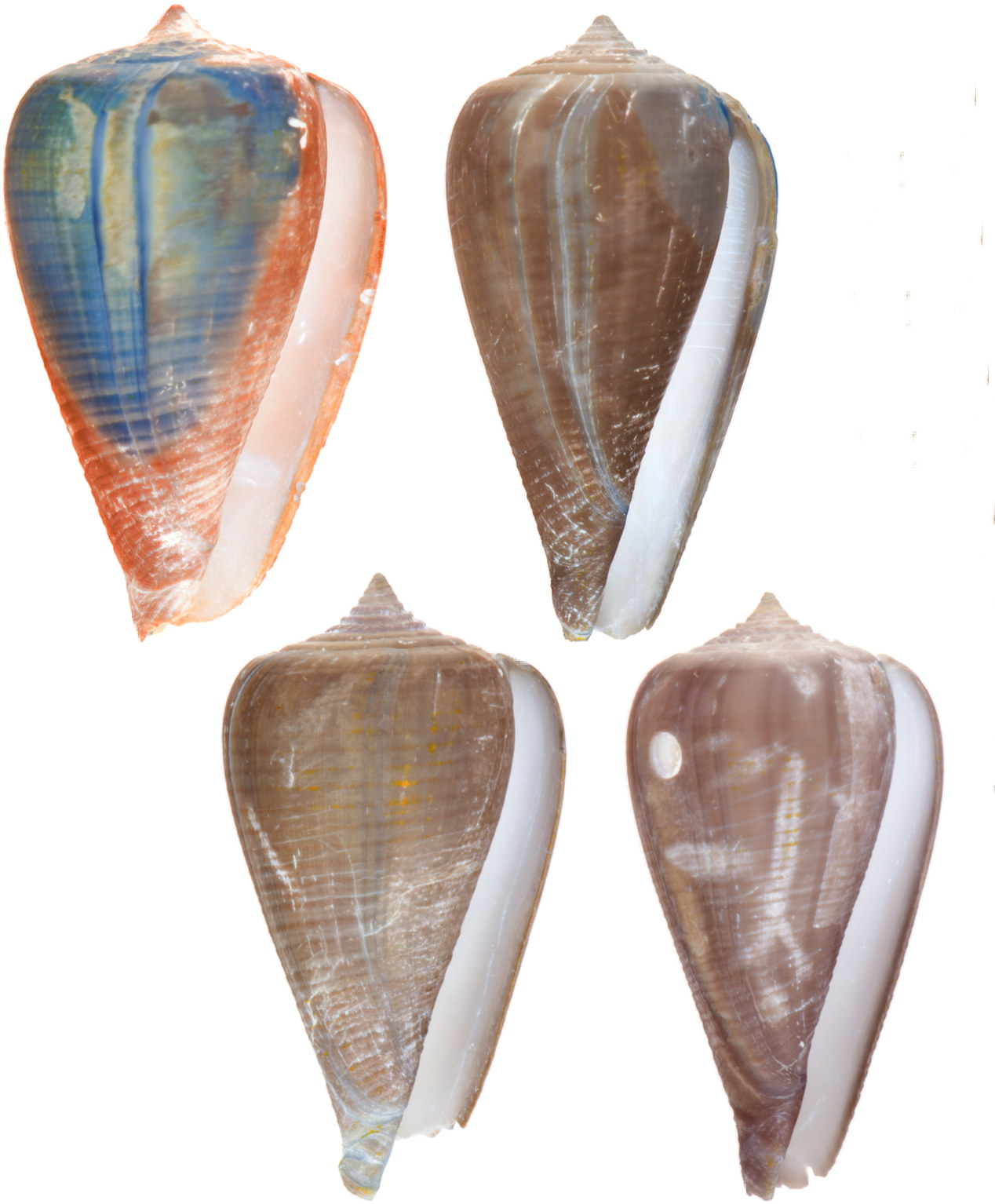
- Four views of a shell of Conus recognitus; all images are reversed images of specimens photographed under UV light

Conservation status
- Extinct (IUCN 3.1)

Scientific classification
- Kingdom: Animalia
- Phylum: Mollusca
- Class: Gastropoda
- Subclass: Caenogastropoda
- Order: Neogastropoda
- Superfamily: Conoidea
- Family: Conidae
- Genus: Conus
- Species: †C. recognitus

Binomial name
- †Conus recognitus Guppy, 1867

Synonyms
- † Conus (Lithoconus) recognitus Guppy, Pflug, 1961; † Conus (Pyruconus) recognitus Guppy, 1867· accepted, alternate representation; † Pyruconus recognitus (Guppy), Tucker and Tenorio, 2009

= Conus recognitus =

Conus recognitus Temporal range: Neogene

Species of sea snail

Conus recognitus is an extinct species of sea snail, a marine gastropod mollusk in the family Conidae, the cone snails, cone shells or cones.

== Description ==
The size of the shell attains 33 mm.

== Distribution ==
This marine species is only known as a fossil from the Neogene of the Dominican Republic.
