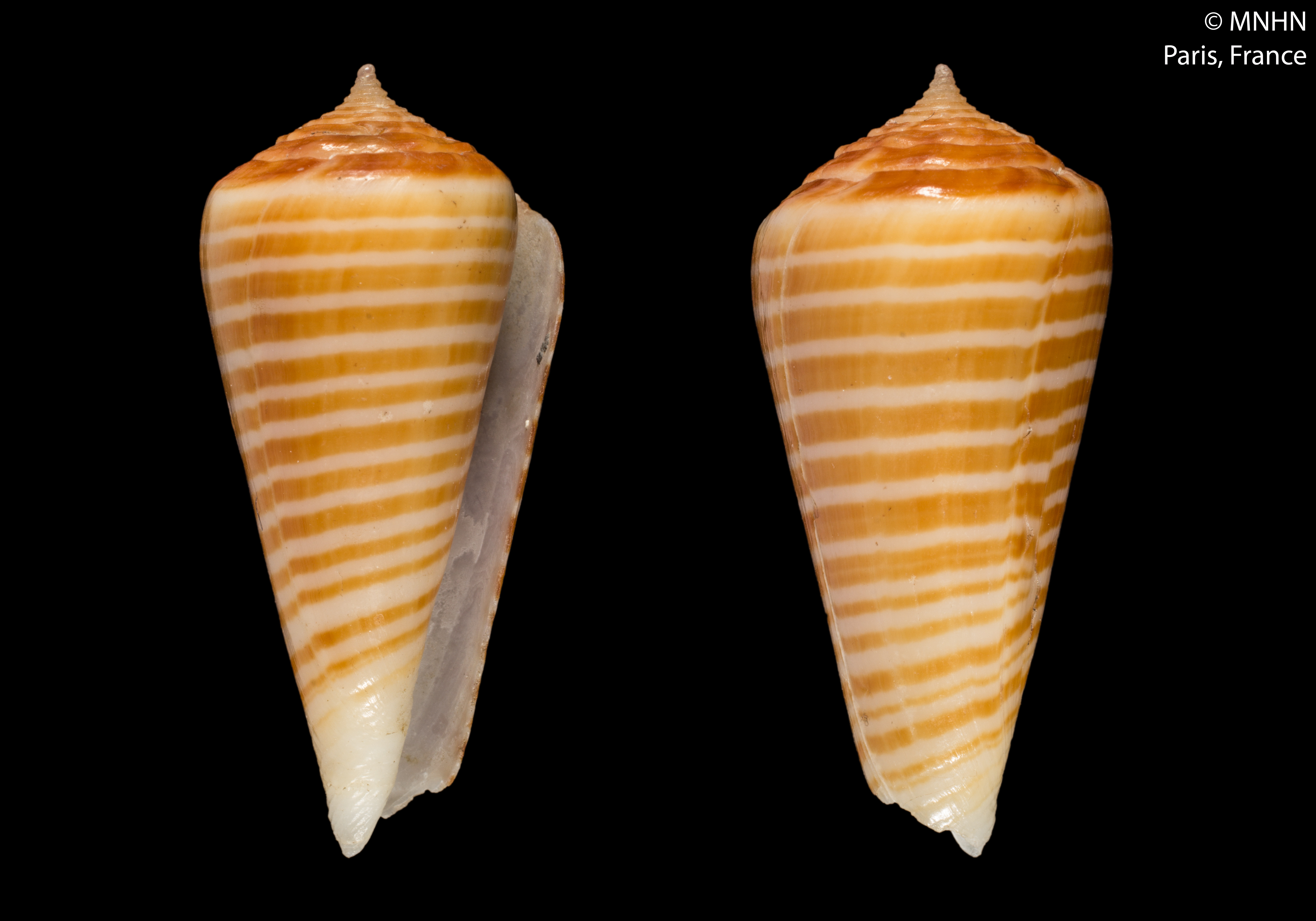
- Shell of Conus hoaraui (holotype at MNHN, Paris)

Scientific classification
- Kingdom: Animalia
- Phylum: Mollusca
- Class: Gastropoda
- Subclass: Caenogastropoda
- Order: Neogastropoda
- Superfamily: Conoidea
- Family: Conidae
- Genus: Conus
- Species: C. hoaraui

Binomial name
- Conus hoaraui (Monnier & Limpalaër, 2015)

Synonyms
- Conus (Splinoconus) hoaraui (Monnier & Limpalaër, 2015) · accepted, alternate representation; Kioconus hoaraui Monnier & Limpalaër, 2015 (original combination)

= Conus hoaraui =

Species of sea snail

Conus hoaraui is a species of sea snail, a marine gastropod mollusc in the family Conidae, the cone snails, cone shells or cones.

These snails are predatory and venomous. They are capable of stinging humans, therefore live ones should be handled carefully or not at all.

== Description ==
The size of the shell can reach 29.2 mm.

== Distribution ==
This marine species in the Indian Ocean off Réunion.
