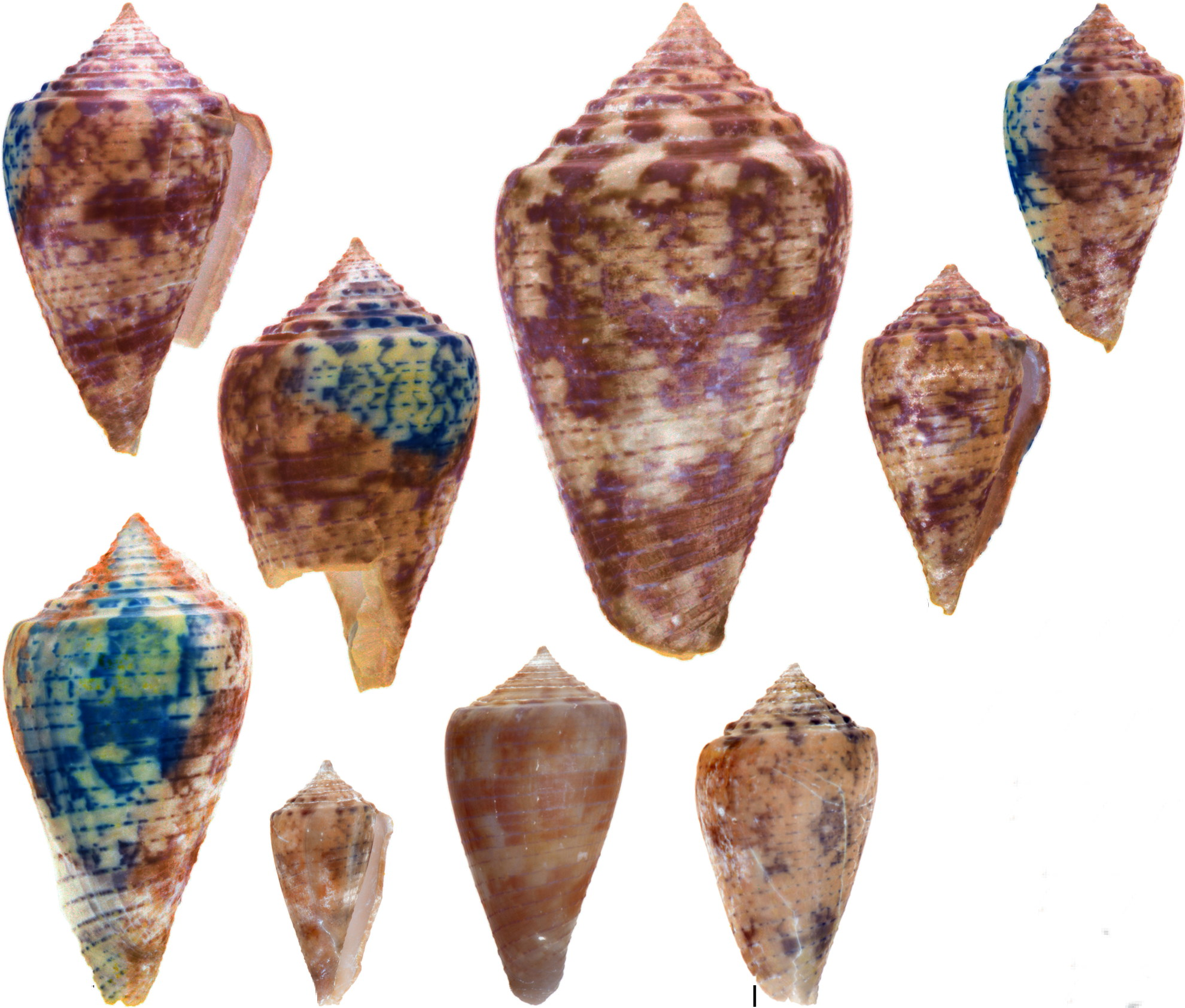
- Fossil specimens of a shell of Conus sewalli; all images are reversed images photographed under UV light

Conservation status
- Extinct (IUCN 3.1)

Scientific classification
- Kingdom: Animalia
- Phylum: Mollusca
- Class: Gastropoda
- Subclass: Caenogastropoda
- Order: Neogastropoda
- Superfamily: Conoidea
- Family: Conidae
- Genus: Conus
- Species: †C. sewalli

Binomial name
- †Conus sewalli Maury, 1917

Synonyms
- † Conus (Stephanoconus) sewalli Maury, 1917 · accepted, alternate representation; † Purpuriconus sewalli (Maury), Tucker and Tenorio, 2009

= Conus sewalli =

Conus sewalli Temporal range: Neogene

Species of sea snail

Conus sewalli is an extinct species of sea snail, a marine gastropod mollusk in the family Conidae, the cone snails, cone shells or cones.

== Description ==
The size of the shell varies between 17 mm and 44 mm.

== Distribution ==
This marine species is only found as a fossil in the Neogene of the Dominican Republic.
