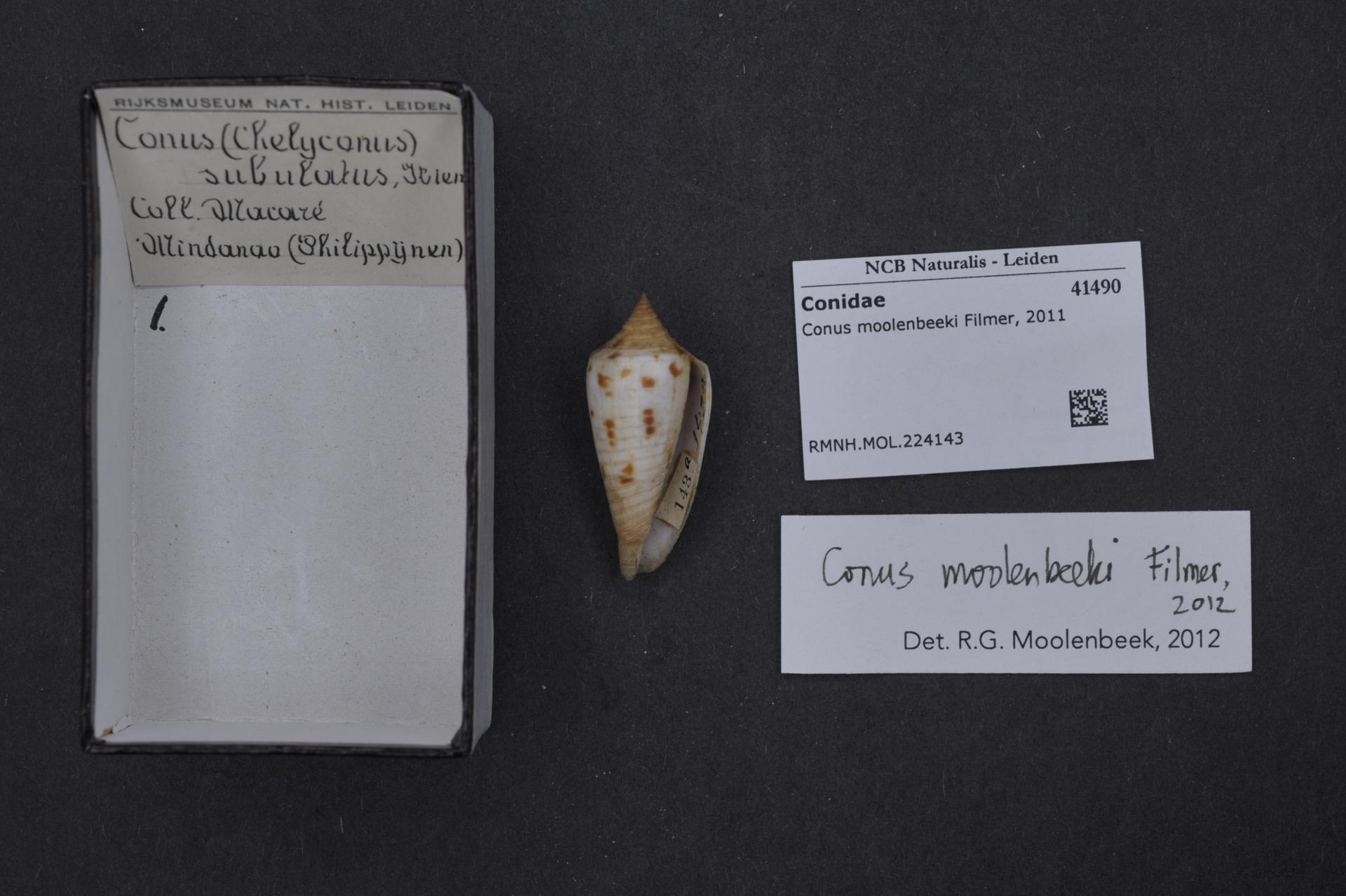

Scientific classification
- Domain: Eukaryota
- Kingdom: Animalia
- Phylum: Mollusca
- Class: Gastropoda
- Subclass: Caenogastropoda
- Order: Neogastropoda
- Superfamily: Conoidea
- Family: Conidae
- Genus: Conus
- Species: C. moolenbeki

Binomial name
- Conus moolenbeki Filmer, 2011

Synonyms
- Conus (Phasmoconus) moolenbeeki Filmer, 2011 · accepted, alternate representation; Graphiconus moolenbeeki (Filmer, 2011)

= Conus moolenbeeki =

Species of sea snail

Conus moolenbeeki is a species of sea snail, a marine gastropod mollusk in the family Conidae, the cone snails and their allies.

Like all species within the genus Conus, these snails are predatory and venomous. They are capable of stinging humans, therefore live ones should be handled carefully or not at all.

== Description ==
The size of the shell varies between 24 mm and 37 mm.

== Distribution ==
This marine species occurs off the Philippines and Indonesia.
