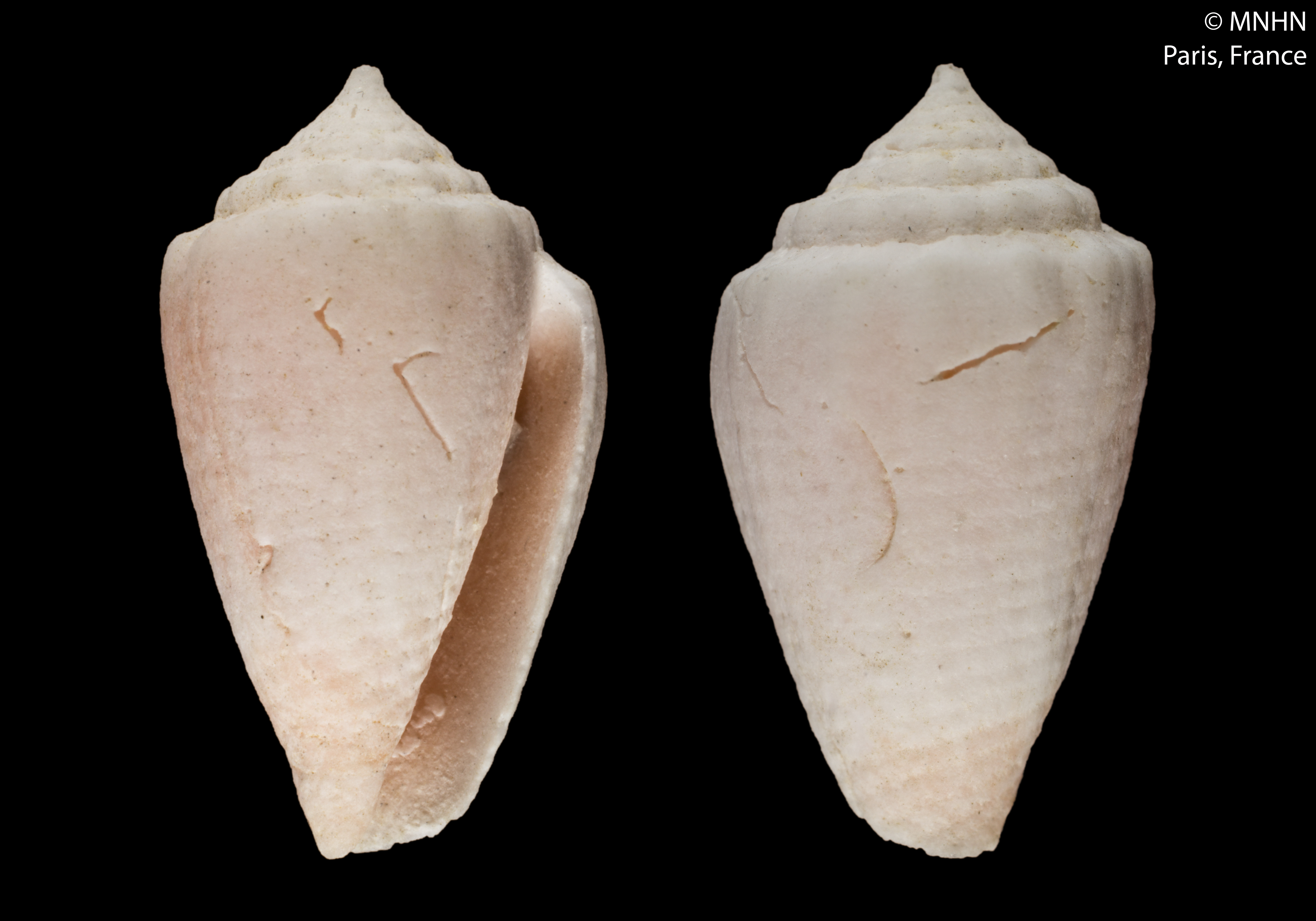
- Shell of Conus lecourtorum (holotype at MNHN, Paris)

Scientific classification
- Kingdom: Animalia
- Phylum: Mollusca
- Class: Gastropoda
- Subclass: Caenogastropoda
- Order: Neogastropoda
- Superfamily: Conoidea
- Family: Conidae
- Genus: Conus
- Species: C. lecourtorum

Binomial name
- Conus lecourtorum (Lorenz, 2011)

Synonyms
- Conus (Virroconus) lecourtorum (Lorenz, 2011)· accepted, alternate representation; Miliariconus lecourtorum (Lorenz, 2011); Rolaniconus lecourtorum Lorenz, 2011

= Conus lecourtorum =

Species of sea snail

Conus lecourtorum is a species of sea snail, a marine gastropod mollusk in the family Conidae, the cone snails, cone shells or cones.

These snails are predatory and venomous. They are capable of stinging humans.

== Description ==
The size of the shell attains 16 mm.

== Distribution ==
This marine species in the Indian Ocean off Mauritius.
