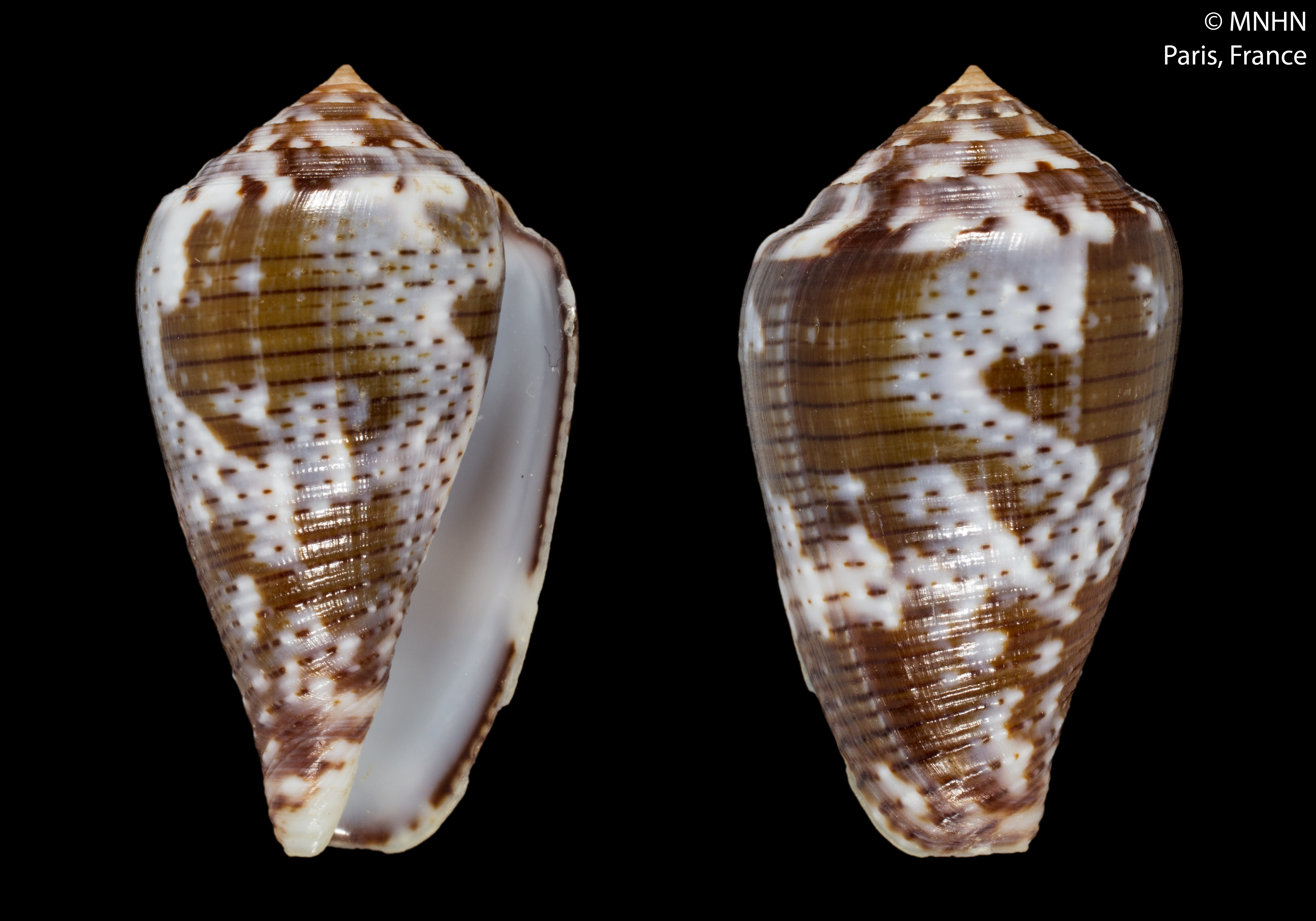
- Shell of Conus easoni (holotype at MNHN, Paris)

Scientific classification
- Kingdom: Animalia
- Phylum: Mollusca
- Class: Gastropoda
- Subclass: Caenogastropoda
- Order: Neogastropoda
- Superfamily: Conoidea
- Family: Conidae
- Genus: Conus
- Species: C. easoni

Binomial name
- Conus easoni (Petuch & Berschauer, 2018)

Synonyms
- Conus (Pionoconus) easoni (Petuch & Berschauer, 2018)· accepted, alternate representation; Pionoconus easoni Petuch & Berschauer, 2018 (original combination)

= Conus easoni =

Species of sea snail

Conus easoni is a species of sea snail, a marine gastropod mollusk in the family Conidae, the cone snails, cone shells or cones.

These snails are predatory and venomous. They are capable of stinging humans.

== Description ==
The length of the shell of the holotype attains 30 mm.

== Distribution ==
This marine species of cone snail occurs in the Pacific Ocean and is endemic to the Marquesas.
