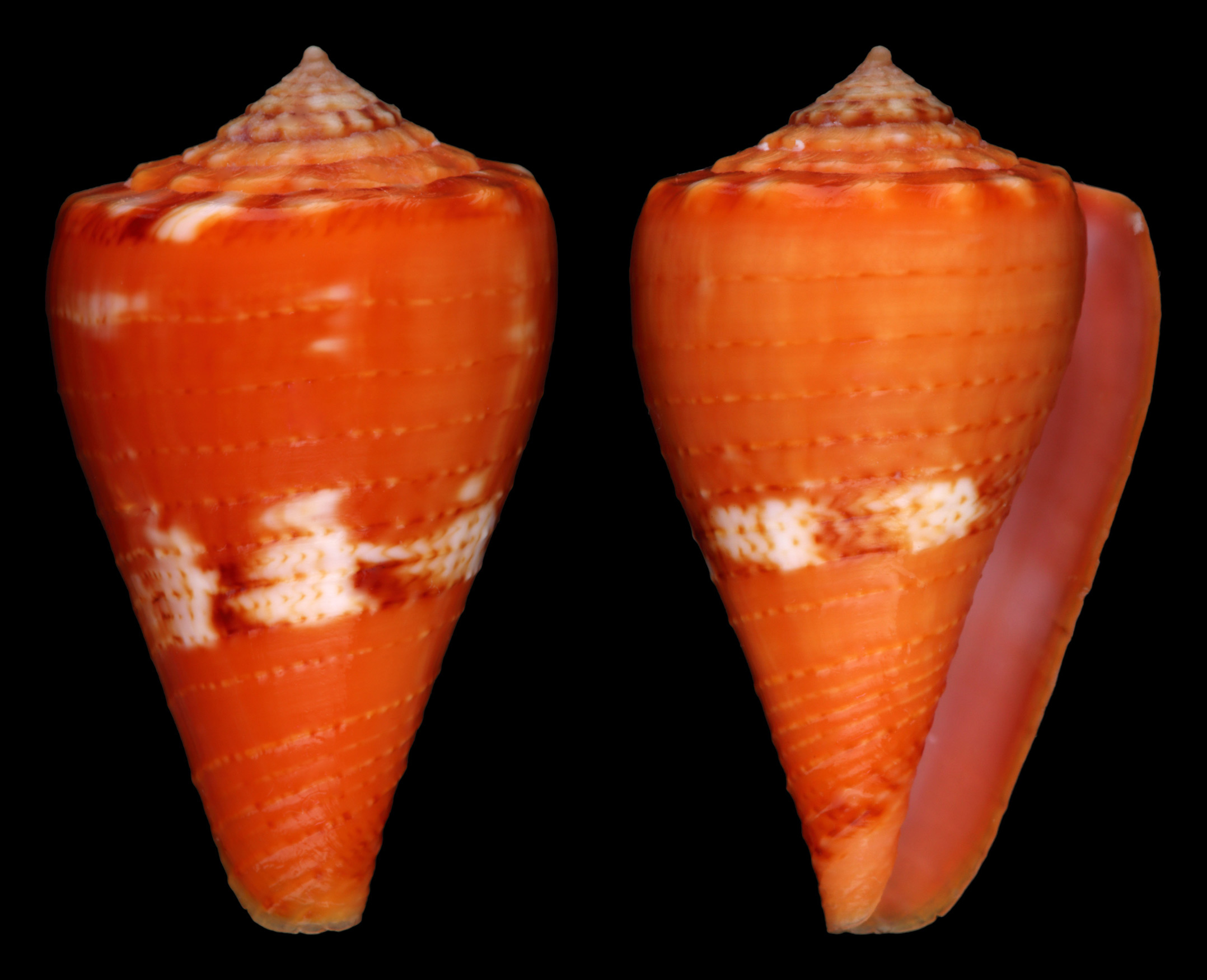
- Shell of marine mollusk, 'conesnail', in the family Conidae

Scientific classification
- Kingdom: Animalia
- Phylum: Mollusca
- Class: Gastropoda
- Subclass: Caenogastropoda
- Order: Neogastropoda
- Superfamily: Conoidea
- Family: Conidae
- Genus: Conus
- Species: C. stanfieldi

Binomial name
- Conus stanfieldi Petuch, 1998

Synonyms
- Conus (Dauciconus) stanfieldi Petuch, 1998 · accepted, alternate representation; Purpuriconus jucundus stanfieldi Petuch, 1998; Purpuriconus stanfieldi (Petuch, 1998)

= Conus stanfieldi =

Species of sea snail

Conus stanfieldi is a species of sea snail, a marine gastropod mollusk in the family Conidae, the cone snails, cone shells or cones.

These snails are predatory and venomous. They are capable of stinging humans.

== Description ==
The size of the shell attains 33 mm.

== Distribution ==
This marine species occurs off the Bahamas.
