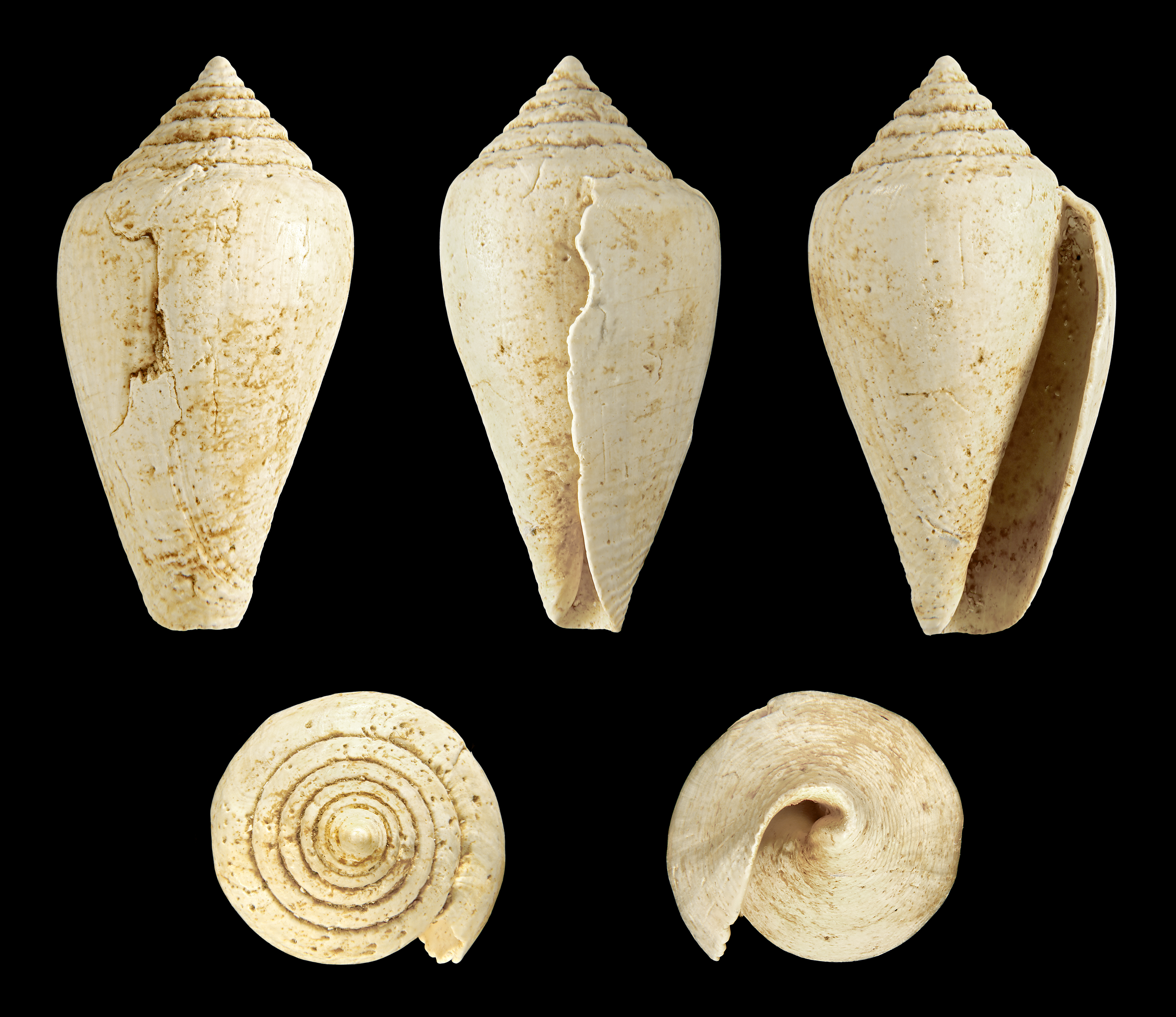
- Several views of a shell of Conus saucatsensis

Conservation status
- Extinct (IUCN 3.1)

Scientific classification
- Kingdom: Animalia
- Phylum: Mollusca
- Class: Gastropoda
- Subclass: Caenogastropoda
- Order: Neogastropoda
- Superfamily: Conoidea
- Family: Conidae
- Genus: Conus
- Species: †C. saucatsensis

Binomial name
- †Conus saucatsensis Mayer-Eymar, 1890

Synonyms
- Leptoconus saucatsensis Mayer-Eymar, 1890

= Conus saucatsensis =

Conus saucatsensis Temporal range: Miocene

Species of sea snail

Conus saucatsensis is an extinct species of sea snail, a marine gastropod mollusk in the family Conidae, the cone snails, cone shells or cones.

== Description ==
The size of the shell attains 36 mm.

== Distribution ==
This marine species is only known as a fossil from the Miocene found near Bordeaux, France.
