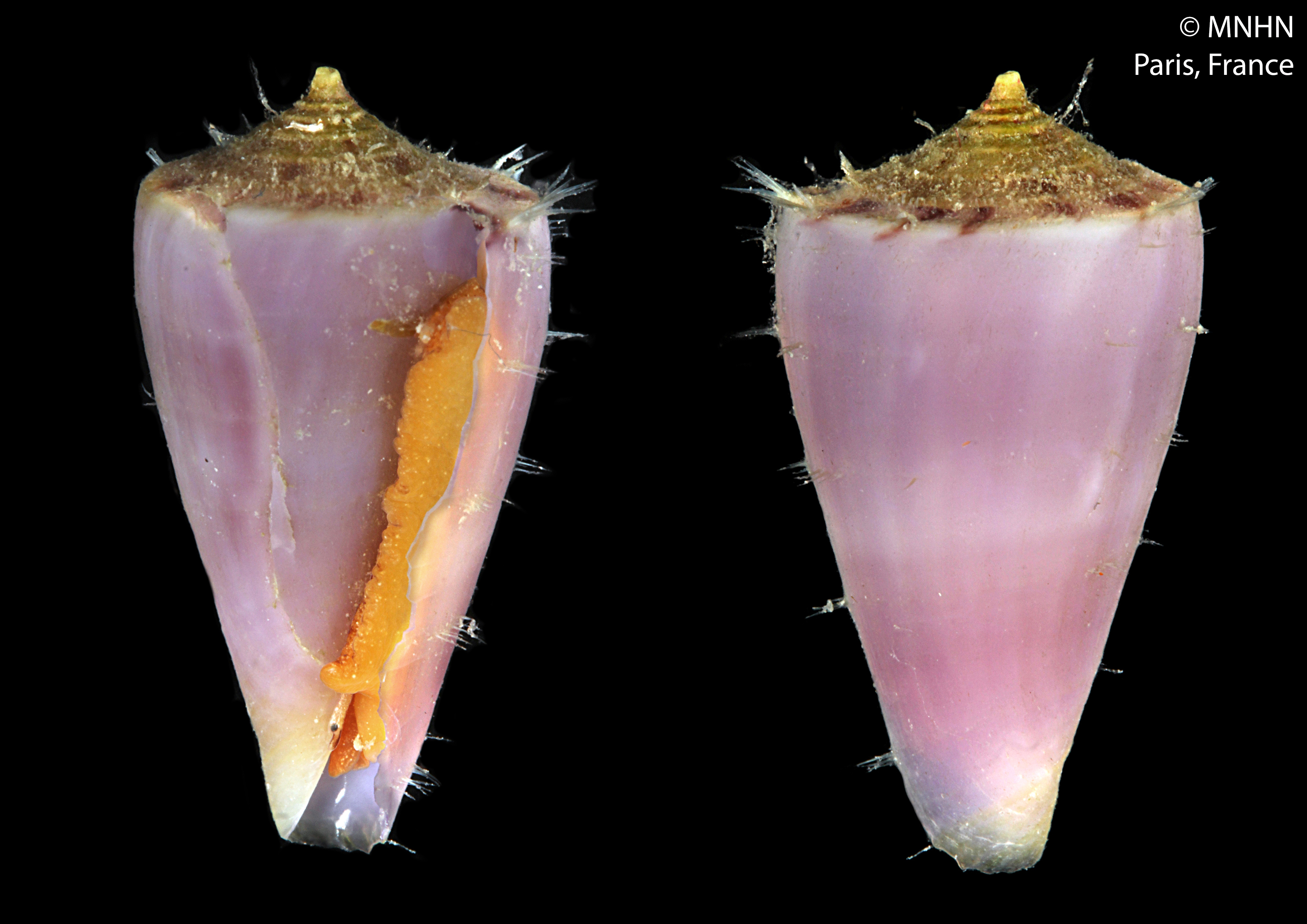
- Shell of Conus hilli (specimen at MNHN, Paris)

Scientific classification
- Kingdom: Animalia
- Phylum: Mollusca
- Class: Gastropoda
- Subclass: Caenogastropoda
- Order: Neogastropoda
- Superfamily: Conoidea
- Family: Conidae
- Genus: Conus
- Species: C. hilli

Binomial name
- Conus hilli Petuch, 1990

Synonyms
- Conus (Dauciconus) hilli Petuch, 1990 · accepted, alternate representation; Purpuriconus hilli (Petuch, 1990)

= Conus hilli =

Species of sea snail

Conus hilli is a species of sea snail, a marine gastropod mollusk in the family Conidae, the cone snails, cone shells or cones.

These snails are predatory and venomous. They are capable of stinging humans.

== Description ==
The size of the shell attains 21 mm.

== Distribution ==
This marine species occurs in the Caribbean Sea off Panama and Guadeloupe.
