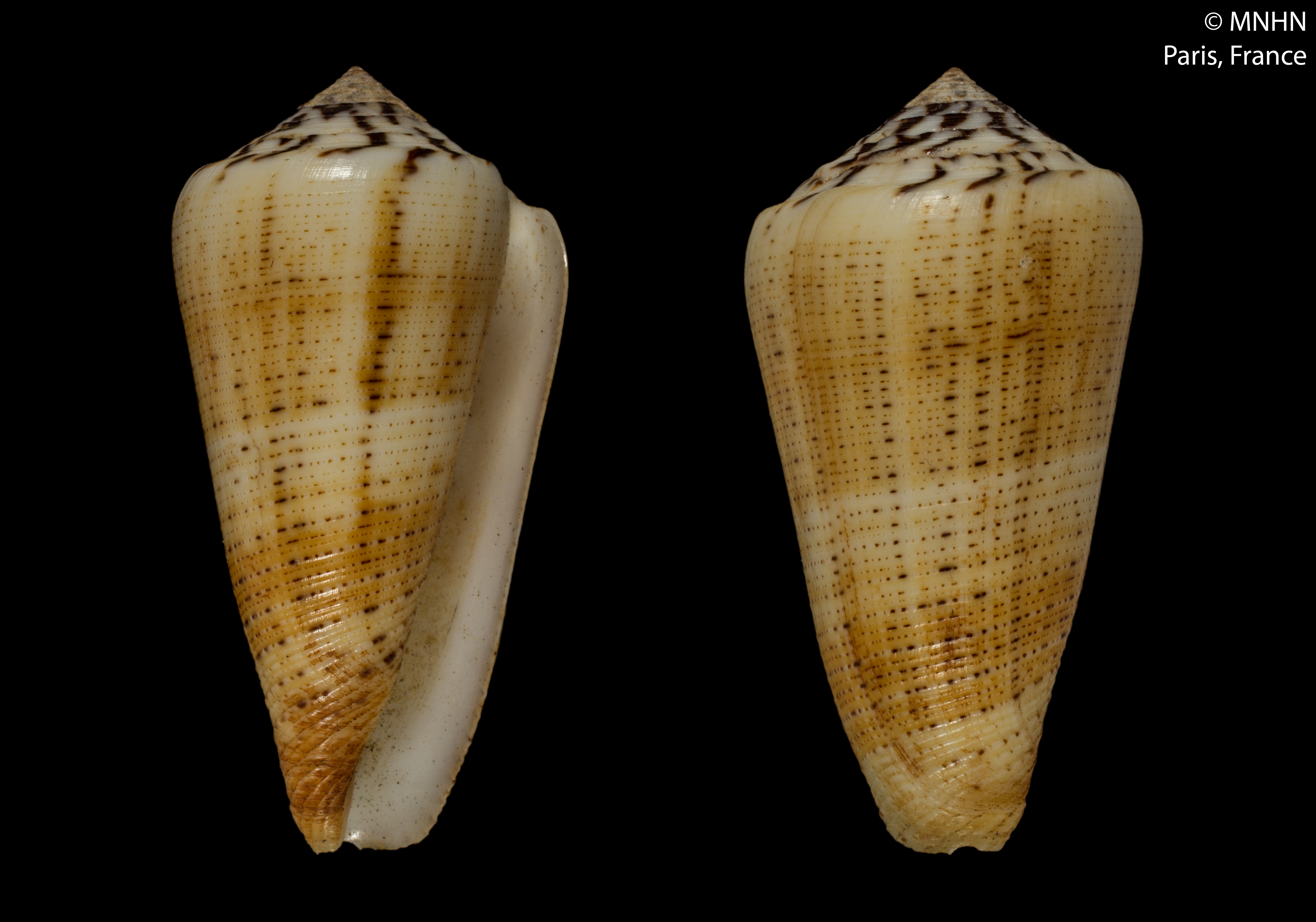
- Shell of Conus alexisallaryi (holotype at MNHN, Paris)

Scientific classification
- Kingdom: Animalia
- Phylum: Mollusca
- Class: Gastropoda
- Subclass: Caenogastropoda
- Order: Neogastropoda
- Superfamily: Conoidea
- Family: Conidae
- Genus: Conus
- Species: C. alexisallaryi

Binomial name
- Conus alexisallaryi (Cossignani, 2018)

Synonyms
- Conus (Pionoconus) alexisallaryi (Cossignani, 2018); Pionoconus alexisallaryi Cossignani, 2018

= Conus alexisallaryi =

Species of sea snail

Conus alexisallaryi is a species of sea snail, a marine gastropod mollusk, in the family Conidae, the cone snails and their allies.

== Description ==
The length of the holotype measures 49.5 mm.

== Distribution ==
This marine species occurs off the Solomon Islands.
