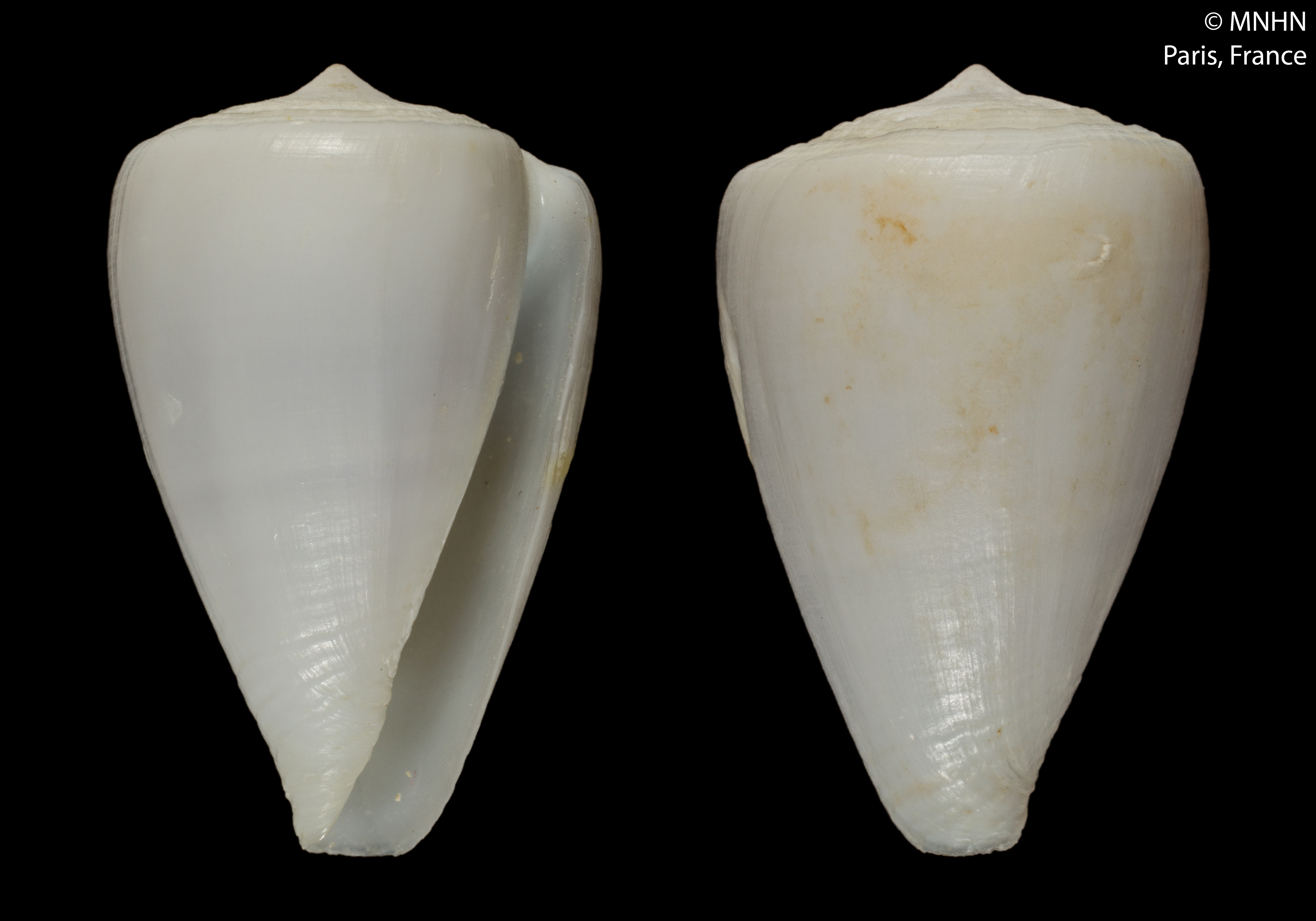
- Shell of Conus angeluquei (paratype at MNHN, Paris)

Scientific classification
- Kingdom: Animalia
- Phylum: Mollusca
- Class: Gastropoda
- Subclass: Caenogastropoda
- Order: Neogastropoda
- Superfamily: Conoidea
- Family: Conidae
- Genus: Conus
- Species: C. angeluquei

Binomial name
- Conus angeluquei (Tenorio, Abalde & Zardoya, 2018)

Synonyms
- Africonus angeluquei Tenorio, Abalde & Zardoya, 2018

= Conus angeluquei =

Species of gastropod

Conus angeluquei is a species of sea snail, a marine gastropod mollusk, in the family Conidae, the cone snails and their allies.

== Description ==
The length of the shell of the holotype is 24.8 mm.

== Distribution ==
This marine species occurs off the Cape Verdes.
