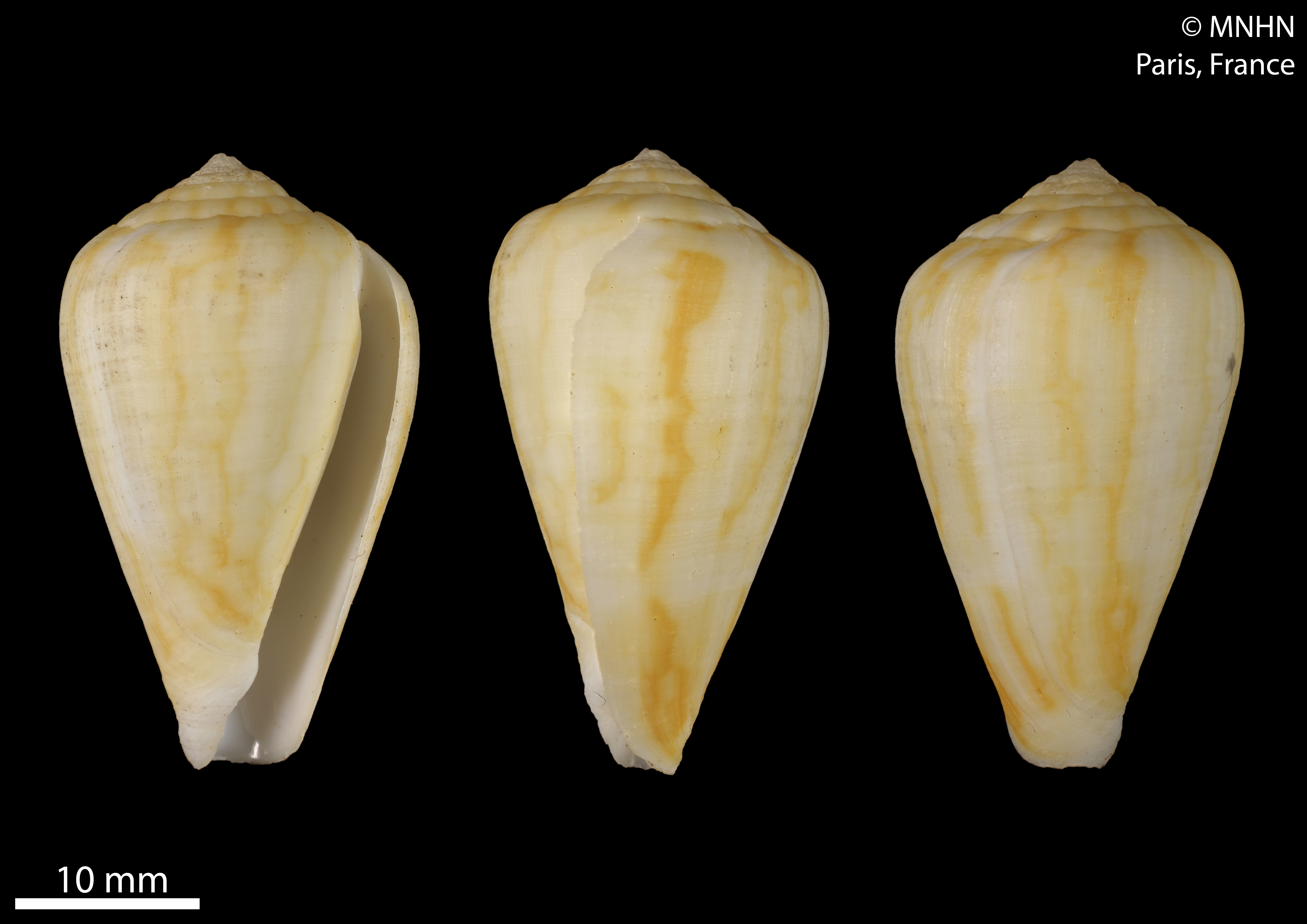
- Shell of Conus nunesi (paratype at MNHN, Paris)

Scientific classification
- Kingdom: Animalia
- Phylum: Mollusca
- Class: Gastropoda
- Subclass: Caenogastropoda
- Order: Neogastropoda
- Superfamily: Conoidea
- Family: Conidae
- Genus: Conus
- Species: C. nunesi

Binomial name
- Conus nunesi Schönherr, 2018

Synonyms
- Conus (Lautoconus) nunesi Schönherr, 2018

= Conus nunesi =

Species of gastropod

Conus nunesi is a species of sea snail, a marine gastropod mollusk, in the family Conidae, the cone snails and their allies. These cone snails are characterized by their predatory behavior, using their venomous harpoons to capture and immobilize prey.

== Distribution ==
This marine species occurs off Angola.
