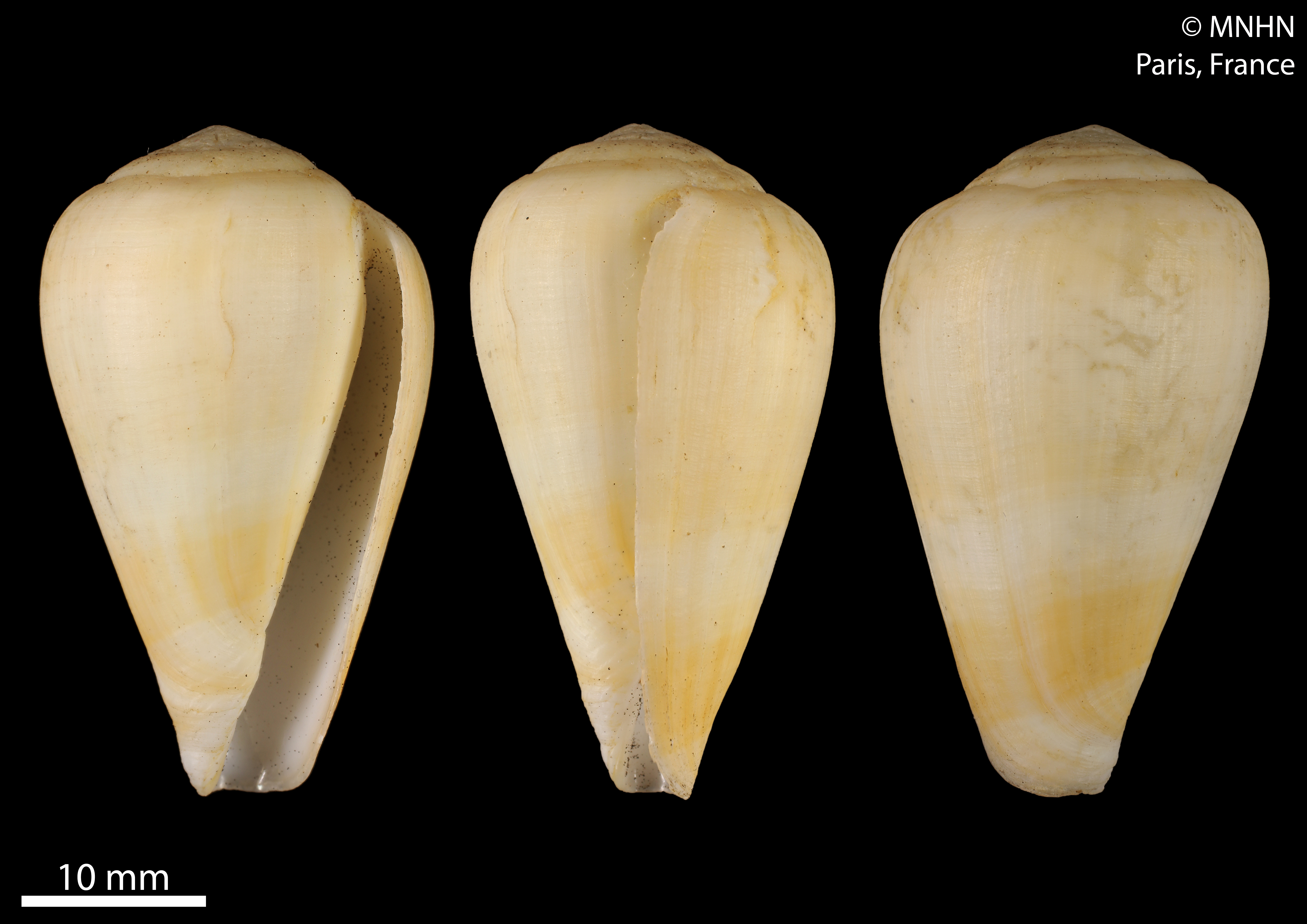
- Shell of Conus annegretae (paratype at MNHN, Paris)

Scientific classification
- Kingdom: Animalia
- Phylum: Mollusca
- Class: Gastropoda
- Subclass: Caenogastropoda
- Order: Neogastropoda
- Superfamily: Conoidea
- Family: Conidae
- Genus: Conus
- Species: C. annegretae

Binomial name
- Conus annegretae Schönherr, 2018

Synonyms
- Conus (Lautoconus) annegretae Schönherr, 2018

= Conus annegretae =

Species of gastropod

Conus annegretae is a species of sea snail, a marine gastropod mollusk, in the family Conidae, the cone snails and their allies.

== Distribution ==
This marine species occurs off Angola.
