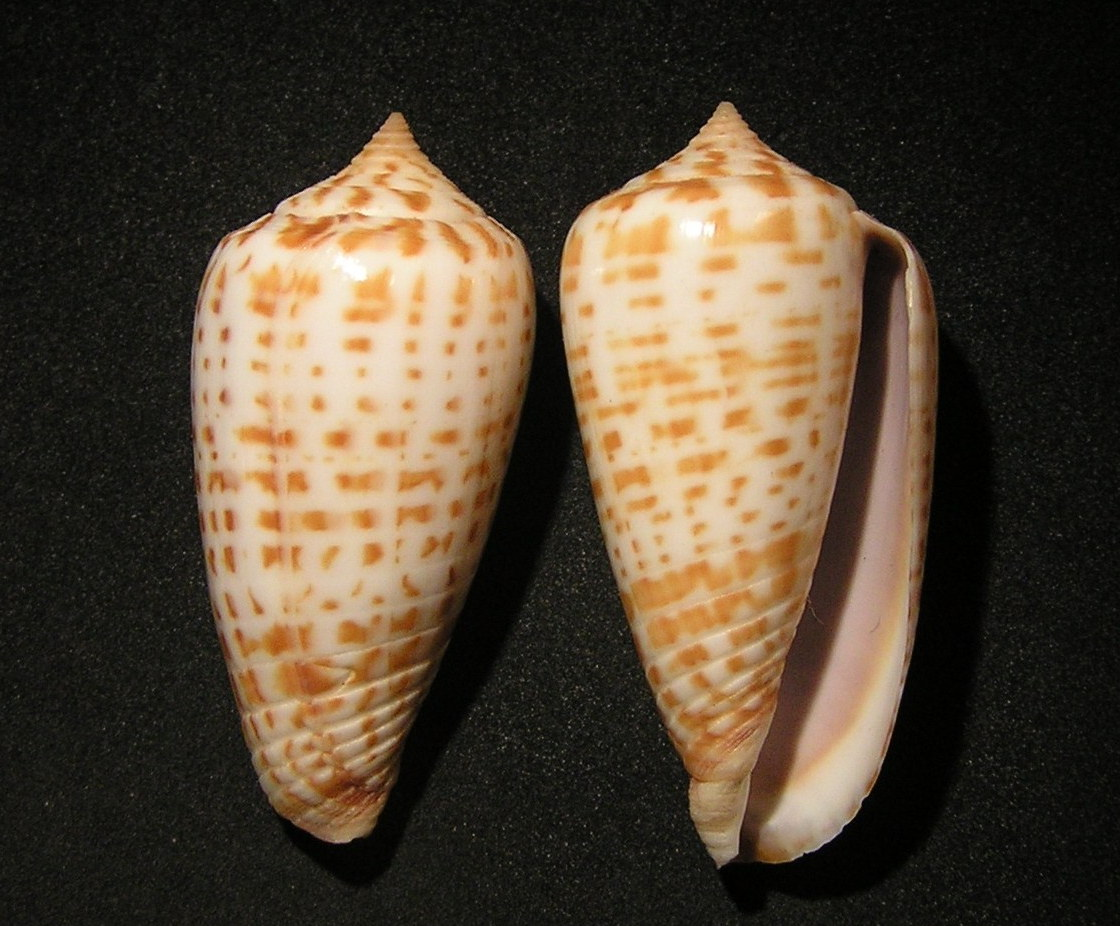
- Two views of a shell of Conus mulderi

Scientific classification
- Kingdom: Animalia
- Phylum: Mollusca
- Class: Gastropoda
- Subclass: Caenogastropoda
- Order: Neogastropoda
- Superfamily: Conoidea
- Family: Conidae
- Genus: Conus
- Species: C. mulderi

Binomial name
- Conus mulderi Fulton, 1936

Synonyms
- Conus (Phasmoconus) mulderi Fulton, 1936 · accepted, alternate representation

= Conus mulderi =

Species of sea snail

Conus mulderi is a species of sea snail, a marine gastropod mollusk in the family Conidae, the cone snails and their allies.

Like all species within the genus Conus, these snails are predatory and venomous. They are capable of stinging humans, therefore live ones should be handled carefully or not at all.

== Description ==
The size of the shell varies between 25 mm and 52 mm .

== Distribution ==
This marine species occurs off the Philippines, Papua New Guinea and the Solomon Islands.
