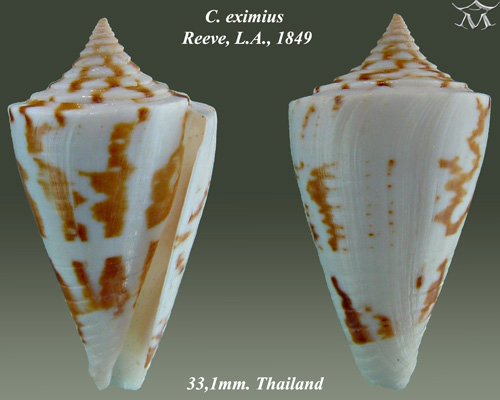
- Apertural and abapertural views of shell of Conus eximius Reeve, L.A., 1849
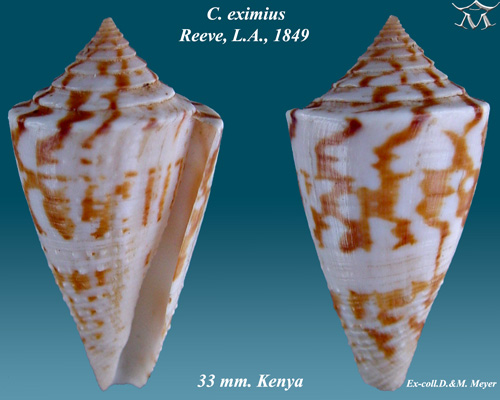

Conservation status
- Least Concern (IUCN 3.1)

Scientific classification
- Kingdom: Animalia
- Phylum: Mollusca
- Class: Gastropoda
- Subclass: Caenogastropoda
- Order: Neogastropoda
- Superfamily: Conoidea
- Family: Conidae
- Genus: Conus
- Species: C. eximius

Binomial name
- Conus eximius Reeve, 1849

Synonyms
- Conus (Lividoconus) eximius Reeve, 1849 · accepted, alternate representation; Calamiconus eximius (Reeve, 1849) )

= Conus eximius =

Species of sea snail

Conus eximius, common name the exceptional cone or the choice cone, is a species of sea snail, a marine gastropod mollusk in the family Conidae, the cone snails and their allies.

Like all species within the genus Conus, these snails are predatory and venomous. They are capable of stinging humans; therefore, live ones should be handled carefully, or not at all.

== Description ==
The size of an adult shell varies between 22 mm and 58 mm. The shell is ovately conical and rather solid. The spire is broadly channeled and at the base distantly grooved. The color of the shell is white, with rust-brown flexuous longitudinal flames, and a white central band, with revolving row of spots.

== Distribution ==
This marine species occurs from the Bay of Bengal to Papua New Guinea, off the Philippines, Taiwan; and Queensland, Australia.

== Gallery ==
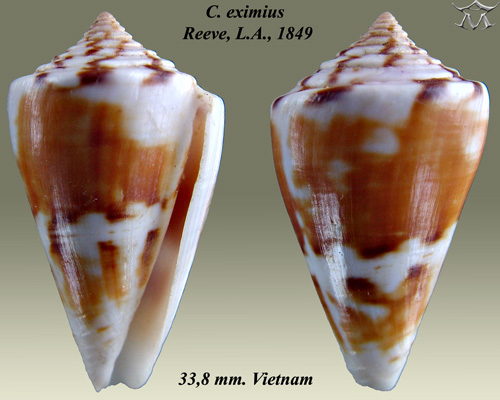
Conus eximius Reeve, L.A., 1849

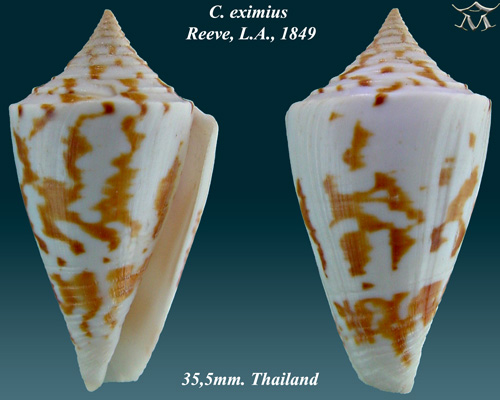
Conus eximius Reeve, L.A., 1849
