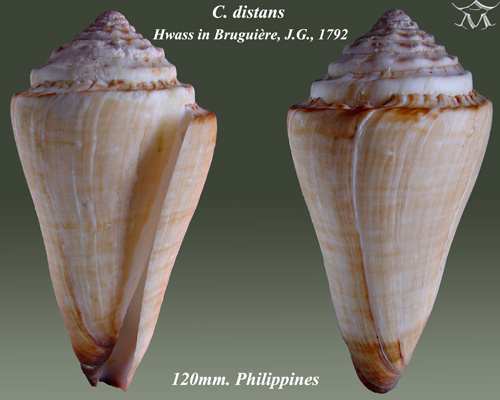
- Apertural and abapertural views of shell of Conus distans Hwass in Bruguière, J.G., 1792
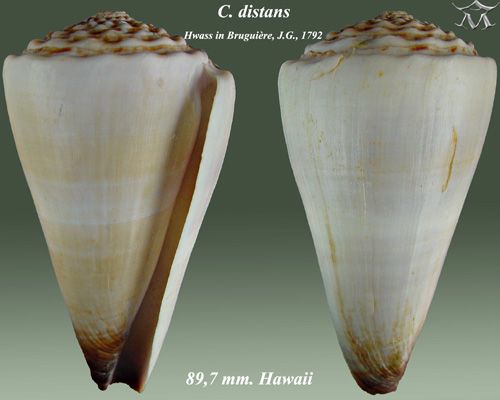

Conservation status
- Least Concern (IUCN 3.1)

Scientific classification
- Kingdom: Animalia
- Phylum: Mollusca
- Class: Gastropoda
- Subclass: Caenogastropoda
- Order: Neogastropoda
- Superfamily: Conoidea
- Family: Conidae
- Genus: Conus
- Species: C. distans

Binomial name
- Conus distans Hwass in Bruguière, 1792

Synonyms
- Conus (Fraterconus) distans Hwass in Bruguière, 1792 · accepted, alternate representation; Conus chinoi Shikama, 1970; Conus kenyonae Brazier, 1896; Conus kenyonae var. arrowsmithensis Brazier, 1896; Conus waterhouseae Brazier, 1896; Fraterconus distans (Hwass in Bruguière, 1792); Rhombiconus distans (Hwass in Bruguière, 1792)

= Conus distans =

Species of sea snail

Conus distans, common name the distant cone, is a species of sea snail, a marine gastropod mollusk in the family Conidae, the cone snails and their allies.

Like all species within the genus Conus, these snails are predatory and venomous. They are capable of stinging humans, therefore live ones should be handled carefully or not at all.

== Description ==
The length of the shell varies between 30 mm and 137 mm. The yellowish fawn-colored shell is obsoletely banded with white at the middle and upper part, sometimes the bands are not continuous, but consist of irregular oblique markings. The body whorl is encircled by obsolete impressed lines. It is stained with violet-chestnut towards the base. The low spire is convex, with rather obtuse rounded tubercles. The white interior is stained with light violet.

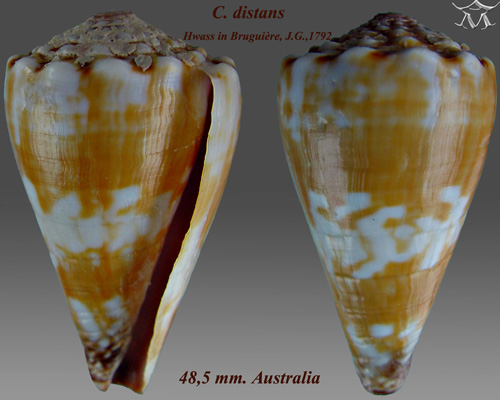
Conus distans Hwass in Bruguière, J.G., 1792

== Distribution ==
This marine species occurs in the Red Sea, in the tropical Indo-West Pacific and off Papua New Guinea and Australia (the Northern Territory, Queensland and Western Australia).
