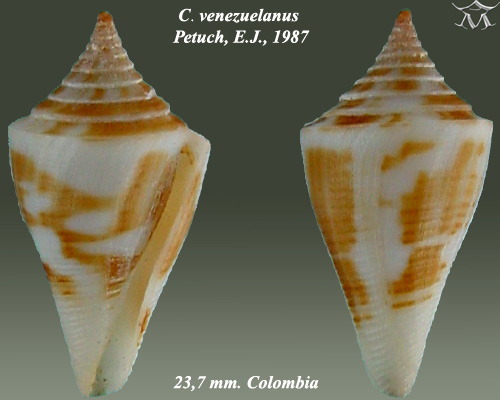
- Apertural and abapertural views of shell of Conus venezuelanus Petuch, E.J., 1987

Scientific classification
- Kingdom: Animalia
- Phylum: Mollusca
- Class: Gastropoda
- Subclass: Caenogastropoda
- Order: Neogastropoda
- Superfamily: Conoidea
- Family: Conidae
- Genus: Conus
- Species: C. venezuelanus

Binomial name
- Conus venezuelanus Petuch, 1987

Synonyms
- Conasprelloides venezuelanus (Petuch, 1987); Conus (Dauciconus) venezuelanus Petuch, 1987 · accepted, alternative representation

= Conus venezuelanus =

Species of sea snail

Conus venezuelanus is a species of sea snail, a marine gastropod mollusk in the family Conidae, the cone snails and their allies.

Like all species within the genus Conus, these snails are predatory and venomous. They are capable of stinging humans, therefore live ones should be handled carefully or not at all.

== Description ==
Original description: "Shell elongated, tapered, with sharp-angled shoulder; spire elevated, concave along sides; body whorl heavily sculptured with numerous fine spiral threads and sulci; spire whorls sculptured with 3 spiral cords; color white to pale salmon-pink, with 2 bands of dark yellow maculations around mid-body; spire marked with scattered small, brown, crescent-shaped flammules; interior of aperture white; periostracum thin, smooth, translucent yellow."

The maximum recorded shell length is 27 mm.

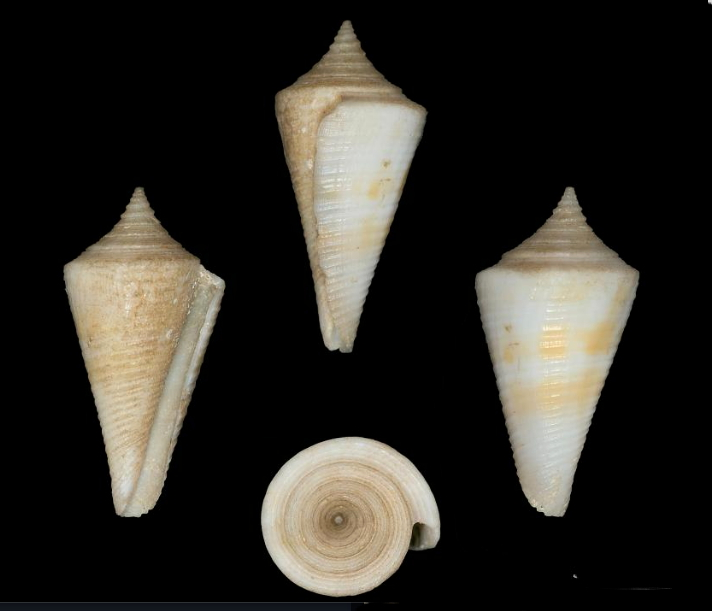
Shell and protoconch of Conus venezuelanus (specimen at the Smithsonian Institution)

== Distribution ==
Locus typicus: "Off Puerto Cabello, Golfo de Triste, Venezuela."

This species occurs in the Caribbean Sea off Venezuela.

== Habitat ==
Minimum recorded depth is 25 m. Maximum recorded depth is 25 m.
