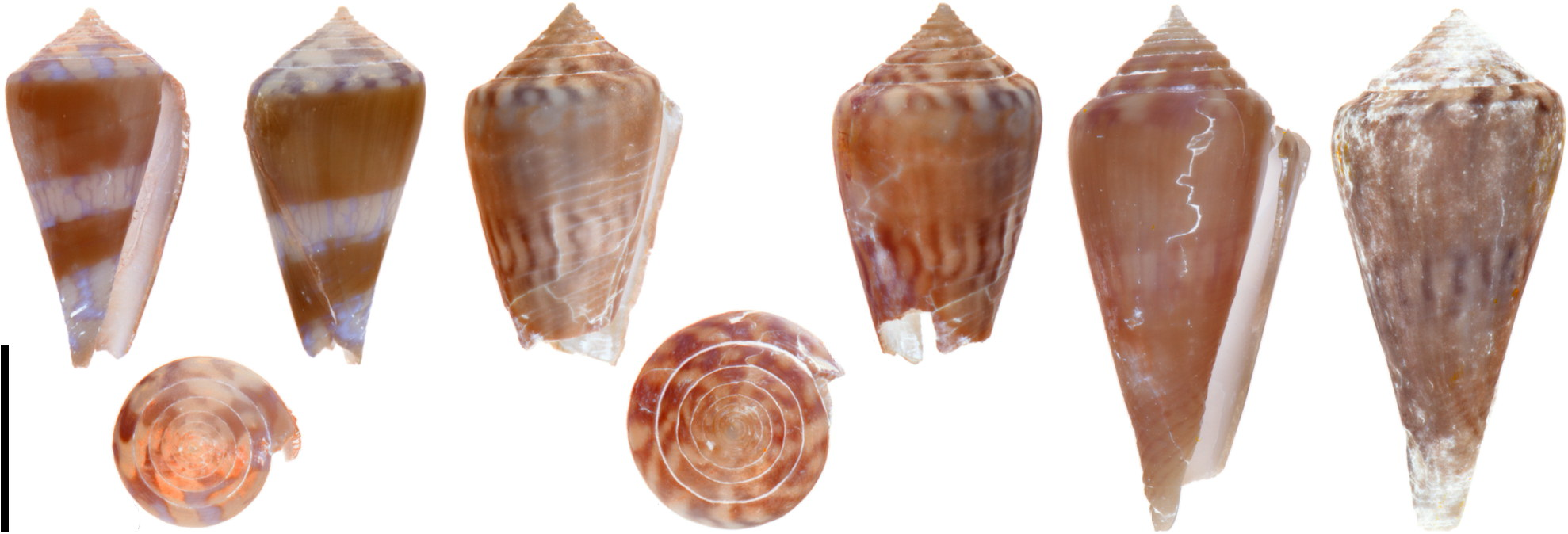
- Several views of a shell of Conus karlschmidti; All are reversed images photographed under UV light

Conservation status
- Extinct (IUCN 3.1)

Scientific classification
- Kingdom: Animalia
- Phylum: Mollusca
- Class: Gastropoda
- Subclass: Caenogastropoda
- Order: Neogastropoda
- Superfamily: Conoidea
- Family: Conidae
- Genus: Conus
- Species: †C. karlschmidti

Binomial name
- †Conus karlschmidti Maury, 1917

Synonyms
- † Conus (Dauciconus) karlschmidti Maury, 1917 · accepted, alternate representation

= Conus karlschmidti =

Conus karlschmidti Temporal range: Neogene

Species of sea snail

Conus karlschmidti is an extinct species of sea snail, a marine gastropod mollusk in the family Conidae, the cone snails, cone shells or cones.

== Description ==
The size of the shell attains 28 mm.

== Distribution ==
This marine species is only known as a fossil from the Neogene of the Dominican Republic.
