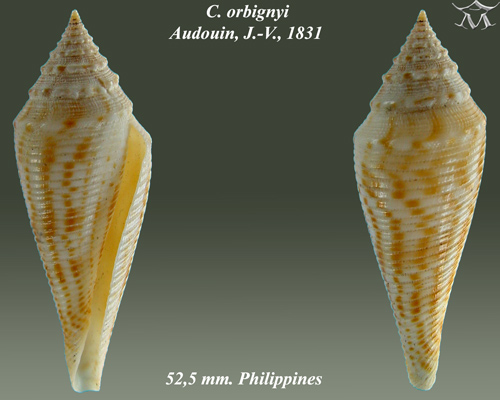
- Apertural and abapertural views of shell of Conasprella orbignyi (Audouin, J.-V., 1831)
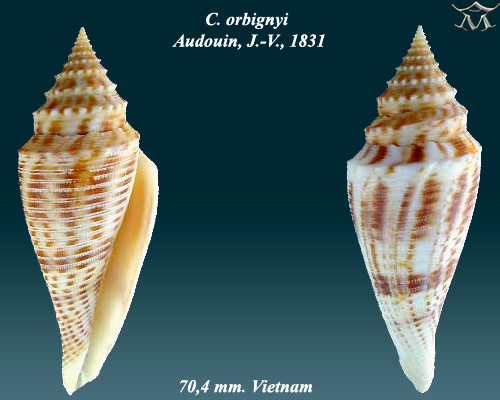

Conservation status
- Least Concern (IUCN 3.1)

Scientific classification
- Kingdom: Animalia
- Phylum: Mollusca
- Class: Gastropoda
- Subclass: Caenogastropoda
- Order: Neogastropoda
- Superfamily: Conoidea
- Family: Conidae
- Genus: Conasprella
- Species: C. orbignyi

Binomial name
- Conasprella orbignyi (Audouin, 1831)

Synonyms
- Bathyconus orbignyi (Audouin, 1831); Conasprella (Fusiconus) orbignyi (Audouin, 1831) · accepted, alternate representation; Conus orbignyi aratus Kilburn, 1973; Conus orbignyi coriolisi Röckel, Richard, & Moolenbeek, 1995; Conus planicostatus G. B. Sowerby II, 1833

= Conasprella orbignyi =

Species of gastropod

Conasprella orbignyi, common name Orbigny's (false) cone, is a species of sea snail, a marine gastropod mollusk in the family Conidae, the cone snails and their allies.

Like all species within the genus Conus, these snails are predatory and venomous. They are capable of stinging humans; therefore, live ones should be handled carefully or not at all.

There is one subspecies: Conus orbignyi elokismenos Kilburn, 1975 (invalid synonym: Conus orbignyi aratus Kilburn, 1973). This subspecies is considered a species in the World Register of Marine Species as Conus elokismenos Kilburn, 1975.

== Description ==
The size of the shell varies between 32 mm and 88 mm.

== Distribution ==
This marine species occurs in the Indo-Pacific (Madagascar, Mozambique, South Africa, Réunion, Eastern India, Japan, New Caledonia, Philippines, Papua New Guinea, Taiwan), and off Australia (Northern Territory, Queensland, Western Australia).
