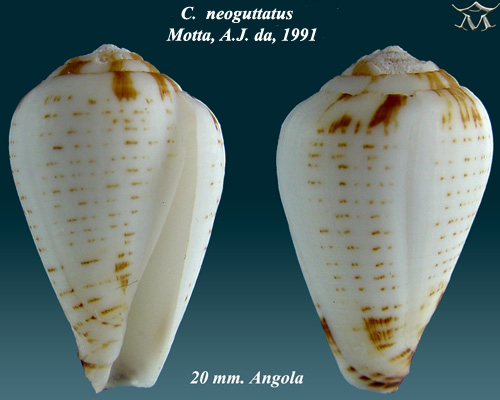
- Apertural and abapertural views of shell of Conus lineopunctatus Motta, A.J. da, 1991
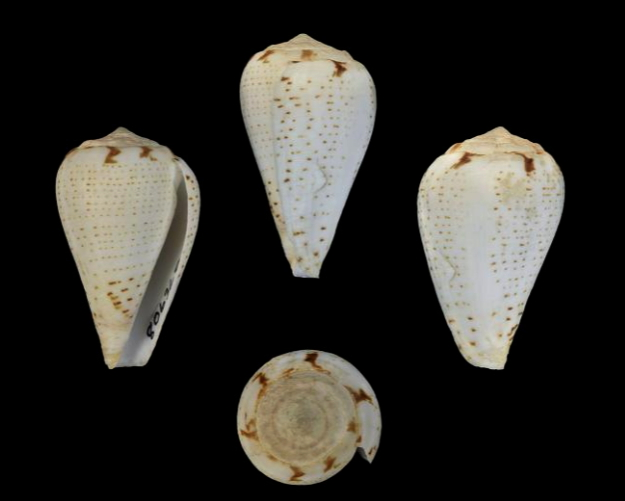

Scientific classification
- Kingdom: Animalia
- Phylum: Mollusca
- Class: Gastropoda
- Subclass: Caenogastropoda
- Order: Neogastropoda
- Superfamily: Conoidea
- Family: Conidae
- Genus: Conus
- Species: C. lineopunctatus

Binomial name
- Conus lineopunctatus Kaicher, 1977

Synonyms
- Africonus lineopunctatus "Trovão, H." Kaicher, S.D., 1977; Conus (Lautoconus) lineopunctatus Kaicher, 1977 · accepted, alternate representation; Conus guttatus Kiener, 1848 (invalid: secondary junior homonym of Cucullus guttatus Röding, 1798; Conus neoguttatus is a replacement name); Conus neoguttatus da Motta, 1991; Varioconus lineopunctatus (Kaicher, 1977); Varioconus neoguttatus (da Motta, 1991

= Conus lineopunctatus =

Species of sea snail

Conus lineopunctatus is a species of sea snail, a marine gastropod mollusk in the family Conidae, the cone snails, cone shells or cones.

These snails are predatory and venomous. They are capable of stinging humans.

== Description ==
The size of the shell varies between 22 mm and 43 mm.

== Distribution ==
This marine species in the South Atlantic Ocean off Angola at a depth of 20 m.
