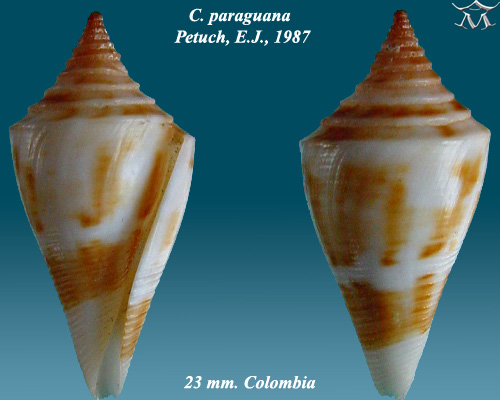
- Apertural and abapertural views of shell of Conus paraguana Petuch, E.J., 1987

Scientific classification
- Kingdom: Animalia
- Phylum: Mollusca
- Class: Gastropoda
- Subclass: Caenogastropoda
- Order: Neogastropoda
- Superfamily: Conoidea
- Family: Conidae
- Genus: Conus
- Species: C. paraguana

Binomial name
- Conus paraguana Petuch, 1987

Synonyms
- Conus (Dauciconus) paraguana Petuch, 1987 · accepted, alternative representation

= Conus paraguana =

Species of sea snail

Conus paraguana is a species of sea snail, a marine gastropod mollusk in the family Conidae, the cone snails and their allies.

Like all species within the genus Conus, these snails are predatory and venomous. They are capable of stinging humans, therefore live ones should be handled carefully or not at all.

== Description ==
Original description: "Shell small for genus, thin, slender, smooth and polished; spire elevated, straight-sided; shoulder slightly rounded, anterior end with 8 deeply-impressed sulci; spire whorls smooth; color yellow with two wide bands of pale tan, closely-packed lines of dots and dashes; wide bands of dots separated by wide, white band around mid-body; white mid-body band with 2 lines of tiny tan dots; spire whorls heavily marked with numerous, large, yellow-tan flammules; interior of aperture white; periostracum thin, yellow, transparent, smooth."

The size of the shell varies between 18 mm and 25 mm.

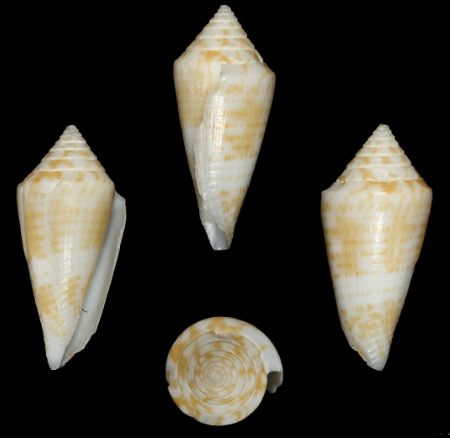
Shell and protoconch of Conus paraguana (specimen at the Smithsonian Institution)

== Distribution ==
Locus typicus: "Gulf of Venezuela, off Los Taques, Paraguana Peninsula, Falcon, Venezuela."

This species occurs in the Caribbean Sea off Venezuela.
