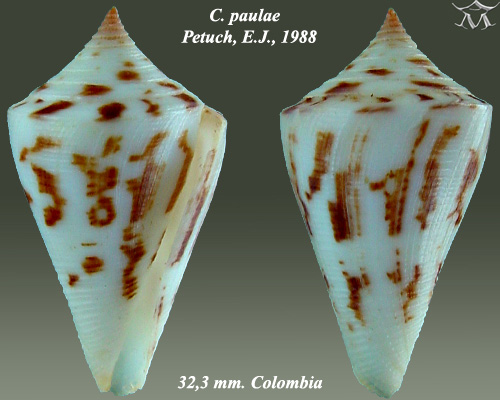
- Apertural and abapertural views of shell of Conus paulae Petuch, E.J., 1988
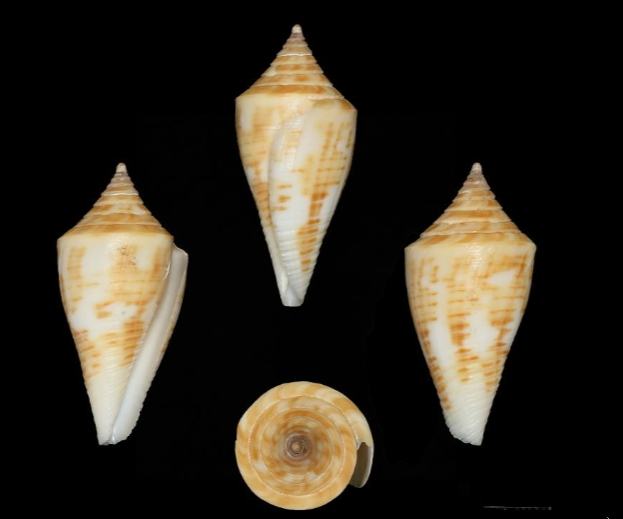

Conservation status
- Least Concern (IUCN 3.1)

Scientific classification
- Kingdom: Animalia
- Phylum: Mollusca
- Class: Gastropoda
- Subclass: Caenogastropoda
- Order: Neogastropoda
- Superfamily: Conoidea
- Family: Conidae
- Genus: Conus
- Species: C. paulae

Binomial name
- Conus paulae Petuch, 1988

Synonyms
- Conus (Dauciconus) paulae Petuch, 1988 · accepted, alternate representation; Gradiconus paulae (Petuch, 1988)

= Conus paulae =

Species of sea snail

Conus paulae is a species of sea snail, a marine gastropod mollusk in the family Conidae, the cone snails and their allies.

Like all species within the genus Conus, these snails are predatory and venomous. They are capable of stinging humans, therefore live ones should be handled carefully or not at all.

== Distribution ==
This species occurs in the Caribbean Sea off Venezuela.

== Description ==
The maximum recorded shell length is 31 mm.

== Habitat ==
Minimum recorded depth is 35 m. Maximum recorded depth is 35 m.
