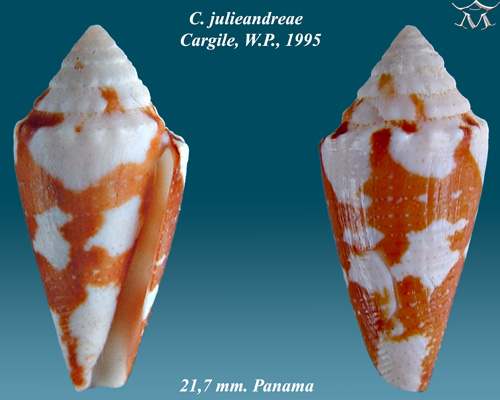
- Apertural and abapertural views of shell of Conus julieandreae Cargile, W.P., 1995

Conservation status
- Least Concern (IUCN 3.1)

Scientific classification
- Kingdom: Animalia
- Phylum: Mollusca
- Class: Gastropoda
- Subclass: Caenogastropoda
- Order: Neogastropoda
- Superfamily: Conoidea
- Family: Conidae
- Genus: Conus
- Species: C. julieandreae

Binomial name
- Conus julieandreae Cargile, 1995

Synonyms
- Conus (Stephanoconus) julieandreae Cargile, 1995 · accepted, alternate representation; Protoconus julieandreae (Cargile, 1995); Tenorioconus julieandreae (Cargile, 1995)

= Conus julieandreae =

Species of sea snail

Conus julieandreae is a species of sea snail, a marine gastropod mollusk in the family Conidae, the cone snails and their allies.

Like all species within the genus Conus, these snails are predatory and venomous. They are capable of stinging humans, therefore live ones should be handled carefully or not at all.

== Distribution ==
This marine species occurs in the Caribbean Sea off Belize, Honduras and Colombia.

Geography
Continents	North America, South America
Countries	Belize, Costa Rica, Guatemala, Honduras, Nicaragua, Panama, Colombia
Biogeographical realms	Neotropical

== Description ==
- Classification: Conus julieandreae belongs to the family Conidae, which includes all cone snails.
- Predatory and venomous: Like all cone snails, Conus julieandreae is a predator and possesses venom, capable of stinging humans, so live specimens should be handled with caution or avoided.
- Shell characteristics:
  - The shell is lightweight and thin, but not fragile.
  - It is slightly glossy, oval, and cylindrical with parallel sides that constrict to a narrower base.
  - The body of the shell has slightly angled depressions that resemble wrinkles.
  - The aperture is wide at the bottom.
- Size: The maximum recorded shell length is 30.7 mm.
- Locality: Cayo Caratasca, East Honduras.
- Habitat: Muddy sand bottom, collected by divers at depths of -15/18m.
- Other: Very rare species, with an irregular lip.

== Habitat ==
Minimum recorded depth is 3 m. Maximum recorded depth is 30 m.
