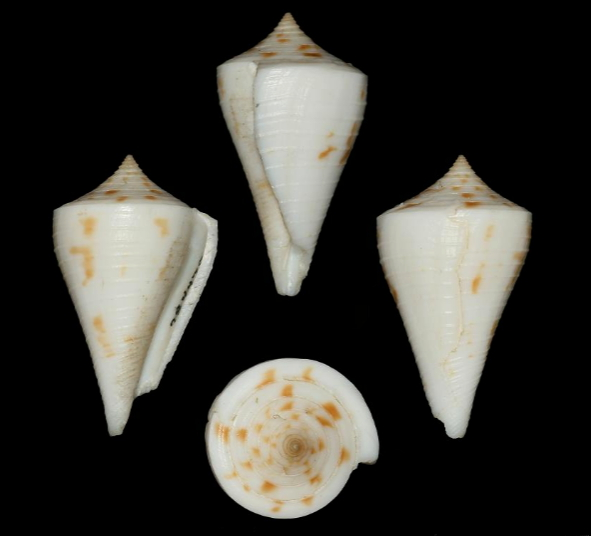
- Shell and protoconch of Conus tristensis (specimen at the Smithsonian Institution)

Scientific classification
- Kingdom: Animalia
- Phylum: Mollusca
- Class: Gastropoda
- Subclass: Caenogastropoda
- Order: Neogastropoda
- Superfamily: Conoidea
- Family: Conidae
- Genus: Conus
- Species: C. tristensis

Binomial name
- Conus tristensis Petuch, 1987

Synonyms
- Conus (Dauciconus) tristensis Petuch, 1987 · accepted, alternate representation; Gradiconus tristensis (Petuch, 1987); Conasprelloides cancellatus var. tristensis Petuch, 1987

= Conus tristensis =

Species of sea snail

Conus tristensis is a species of sea snail, a marine gastropod mollusk in the family Conidae, the cone snails, cone shells or cones.

These snails are predatory and venomous. They are capable of stinging humans.

== Description ==
Original description: "Shell stocky with compressed body, wide across shoulder and tapering rapidly toward anterior end; shoulder sharply angled, slightly carinated; spire low, flattened; body whorl sculptured with 18 prominent, raised spiral cords; spiral cords pustulated; spire whorls sculptured with six incised spiral sulci; shell color pure white with small, scattered pale orange-brown flammules; spire whorls with regularly-spaced, amorphous brown flammules; early whorls pale orange; periostracum thick, with rows of erect hairs that correspond to raised, pustulated cords on body whorl."

The size of the shell varies between 29 mm and 37 mm.

== Distribution ==
Locus typicus: "Off Tucacas, Carabobo, Golfo de Triste, Venezuela."

This marine species occurs in the Caribbean Sea off Colombia and Venezuela.
