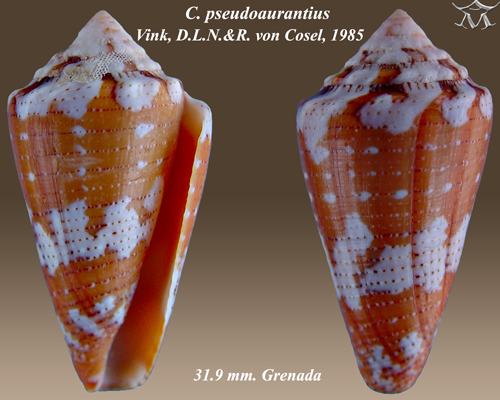
- Apertural and abapertural views of shell of Conus pseudoaurantius Vink, D.L.N. & R. von Cosel, 1985
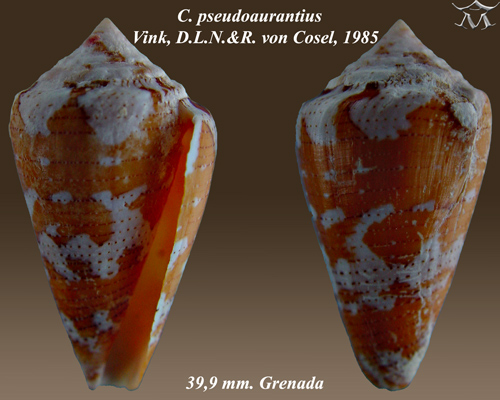

Conservation status
- Least Concern (IUCN 3.1)

Scientific classification
- Domain: Eukaryota
- Kingdom: Animalia
- Phylum: Mollusca
- Class: Gastropoda
- Subclass: Caenogastropoda
- Order: Neogastropoda
- Superfamily: Conoidea
- Family: Conidae
- Genus: Conus
- Species: C. pseudaurantius

Binomial name
- Conus pseudaurantius Vink & Cosel, 1985

Synonyms
- Conus (Stephanoconus) pseudaurantius Vink & Cosel, 1985 · accepted, alternate representation; Protoconus pseudaurantius (Vink & Cosel, 1985); Tenorioconus pseudaurantius (Vink & Cosel, 1985)

= Conus pseudaurantius =

Species of sea snail

Conus pseudaurantius is a species of sea snail, a marine gastropod mollusk in the family Conidae, the cone snails and their allies.

Like all species within the genus Conus, these snails are predatory and venomous. They are capable of stinging humans, therefore live ones should be handled carefully or not at all.

== Distribution ==
This species occurs in the Caribbean Sea and off the Lesser Antilles.

== Description ==
The maximum recorded shell length is 41 mm.

== Habitat ==
Minimum recorded depth is 3 m. Maximum recorded depth is 5 m.
