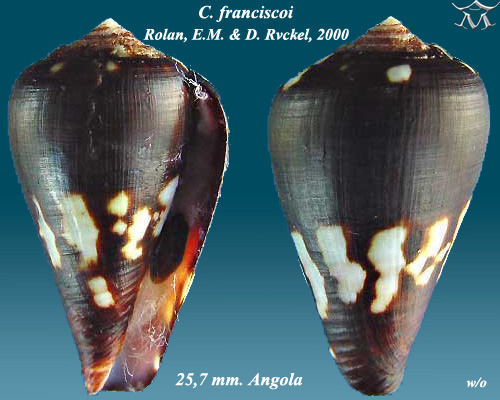
- Apertural and abapertural views of shell of Conus franciscoi Rolán, E.M. & D. Röckel, 2000
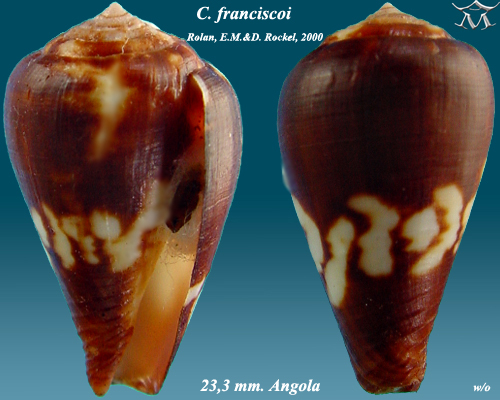

Conservation status
- Least Concern (IUCN 3.1)

Scientific classification
- Kingdom: Animalia
- Phylum: Mollusca
- Class: Gastropoda
- Subclass: Caenogastropoda
- Order: Neogastropoda
- Superfamily: Conoidea
- Family: Conidae
- Genus: Conus
- Species: C. franciscoi

Binomial name
- Conus franciscoi Rolán & Röckel, 2000

Synonyms
- Conus armatus "Trovão, H. MS" Clover, P.W., 1978 (invalid, junior homonym of Conus armatus E. A. Smith, 1891); Conus (Lautoconus) franciscoi Rolán & Röckel, 2000 · accepted, alternate representation; Varioconus franciscoi (Rolán & Röckel, 2000)

= Conus franciscoi =

Species of sea snail

Conus franciscoi is a species of sea snail, a marine gastropod mollusk in the family Conidae, the cone snails and their allies.

Like all species within the genus Conus, these snails are predatory and venomous. They are capable of stinging humans, therefore live ones should be handled carefully or not at all.

== Description ==
The size of the shell varies between 28 mm and 38 mm.

Conus franciscoi is a non-broadcast spawner. Life cycle does not include trochophore stage.

== Distribution ==
This species occurs in the Atlantic Ocean off Angola.
