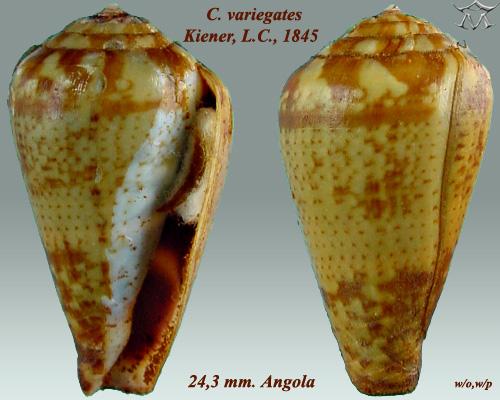
- Apertural and abapertural views of shell of Conus variegatus Kiener, L.C., 1845
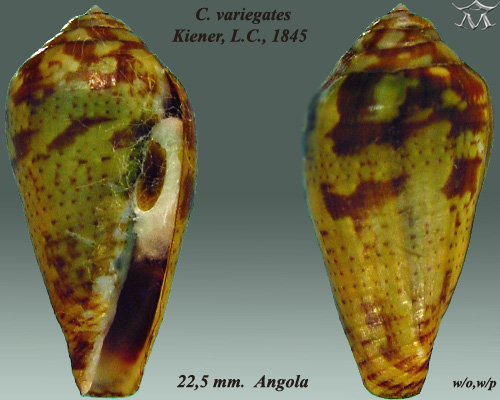

Conservation status
- Least Concern (IUCN 3.1)

Scientific classification
- Kingdom: Animalia
- Phylum: Mollusca
- Class: Gastropoda
- Subclass: Caenogastropoda
- Order: Neogastropoda
- Superfamily: Conoidea
- Family: Conidae
- Genus: Conus
- Species: C. variegatus

Binomial name
- Conus variegatus Kiener, 1848

Synonyms
- Conus (Lautoconus) variegatus Kiener, 1848 · accepted, alternate representation; Conus obtusus Kiener, 1845 (invalid: junior homonym of Conus mediterraneus var. obtusa Requien, 1848); Varioconus variegatus (Kiener, 1848)

= Conus variegatus =

Species of sea snail

Conus variegatus, common name the variable cone, is a species of sea snail, a marine gastropod mollusk in the family Conidae, the cone snails and their allies.

Like all species within the genus Conus, these snails are predatory and venomous. They are capable of stinging humans, therefore live ones should be handled carefully or not at all.

== Description ==
The size of the shell varies between 12 mm and 43 mm. The color of the shell is yellowish brown or chestnut-color, maculated with brown on the shoulder, The shell shows numerous fine chocolate revolving lines often broken up into spots.

== Distribution ==
This species occurs in the Atlantic Ocean off Angola.
