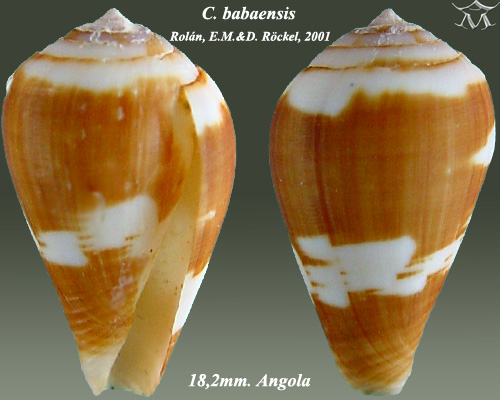
- Apertural and abapertural views of shell of Conus babaensis Rolán, E.M. & D. Röckel, 2001
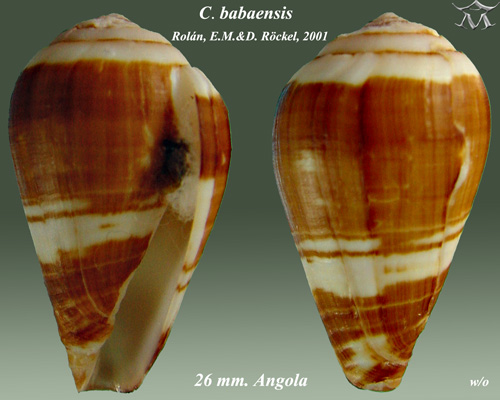

Conservation status
- Least Concern (IUCN 3.1)

Scientific classification
- Kingdom: Animalia
- Phylum: Mollusca
- Class: Gastropoda
- Subclass: Caenogastropoda
- Order: Neogastropoda
- Superfamily: Conoidea
- Family: Conidae
- Genus: Conus
- Species: C. babaensis

Binomial name
- Conus babaensis Rolán & Röckel, 2001

Synonyms
- Conus (Lautoconus) babaensis Rolán & Röckel, 2001 · accepted, alternate representation; Varioconus babaensis (Rolán & Röckel, 2001)

= Conus babaensis =

Species of sea snail

Conus babaensis is a species of sea snail, a marine gastropod mollusk in the family Conidae, the cone snails and their allies.

Like all species within the genus Conus, these snails are predatory and venomous. They are capable of stinging humans, therefore live ones should be handled carefully or not at all.

== Description ==
The size of the shell varies between 17 mm and 35 mm. Conus babaensis has a small to moderately small shell with rounded shoulder and a slightly wider base. Its color is white with two light brown spiral bands. It has 48-78 narrow and elongated teeth in its radula.

== Distribution ==
This species occurs in the Atlantic Ocean off Angola in shallow water, buried in sand under rocks.
