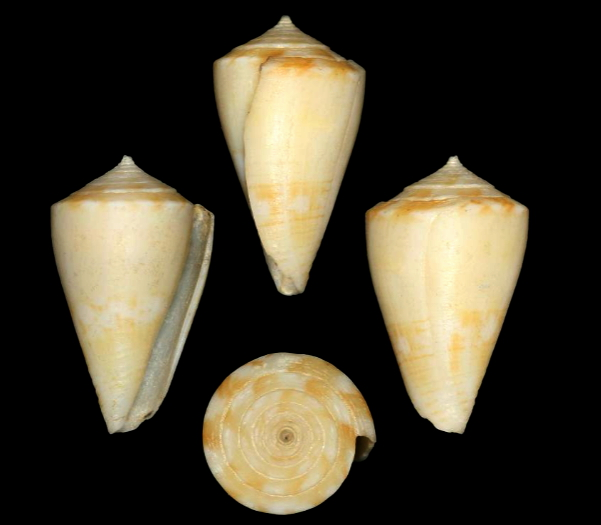
- Shell and protoconch of Conus colombianus (holotype at the Smithsonian Institution)

Scientific classification
- Kingdom: Animalia
- Phylum: Mollusca
- Class: Gastropoda
- Subclass: Caenogastropoda
- Order: Neogastropoda
- Superfamily: Conoidea
- Family: Conidae
- Genus: Conus
- Species: C. colombianus

Binomial name
- Conus colombianus Petuch, 1987

Synonyms
- Conus (Dauciconus) colombianus Petuch, 1987 · accepted, alternative representation; Poremskiconus colombianus (Petuch, 1987)

= Conus colombianus =

Species of sea snail

Conus colombianus is a species of sea snail, a marine gastropod mollusk in the family Conidae, the cone snails, cone shells or cones.

These snails are predatory and venomous. They are capable of stinging humans.

== Description ==
Original description: "Shell small for genus, stocky, broad across shoulder; spire low, flattened; shoulder sharp-angled; body whorl smooth, with 10 small spiral cords around the anterior end; spire with 4 spiral threads; shell pale yellow with 4 closely-spaced brown lines around body whorl just below (anterior of) mid-body; brown flammules and white blotches run through 4 lines and extend over anterior tip; body whorl above (posterior of) mid-body line without markings or pattern; spire marked with large, evenly-spaced orange-tan flammules; spire flammules extend onto sharp edge of shoulder, giving shoulder checkered appearance; interior of aperture white."

The size of the shell varies between 22.5 mm and 57 mm.

== Distribution ==
Locus typicus: "Off Islas del Rosario, Colombia."

This species occurs in the Caribbean Sea off Colombia.
