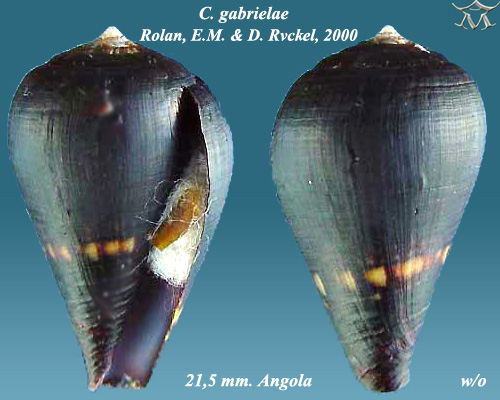
- Apertural and abapertural views of shell of Conus negroides Kaicher, 1977
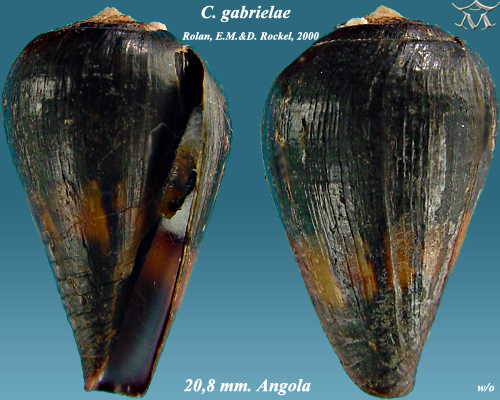

Conservation status
- Least Concern (IUCN 3.1)

Scientific classification
- Kingdom: Animalia
- Phylum: Mollusca
- Class: Gastropoda
- Subclass: Caenogastropoda
- Order: Neogastropoda
- Superfamily: Conoidea
- Family: Conidae
- Genus: Conus
- Species: C. negroides

Binomial name
- Conus negroides Kaicher, 1977

Synonyms
- Conus (Lautoconus) negroides Kaicher, 1977 · accepted, alternate representation; Conus gabrielae Rolán & Röckel, 2000; Varioconus gabrielae (Rolán & Röckel, 2000); Varioconus negroides (Kaicher, 1977)

= Conus negroides =

Species of sea snail

Conus negroides is a species of sea snail, a marine gastropod mollusk in the family Conidae, the cone snails and their allies.

Like all species within the genus Conus, these snails are predatory and venomous. They are capable of stinging humans, therefore live ones should be handled carefully or not at all.

== Description ==
The size of an adult shell varies between 15 mm and 32 mm. It is mostly black, with a white point. The most have white patterns on the shells.

== Distribution ==
This species occurs in the Atlantic Ocean off Angola.
