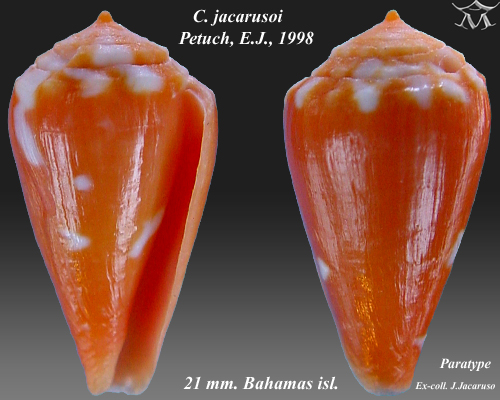
- Apertural and abapertural views of shell of Conus jacarusoi Petuch, E.J., 1998
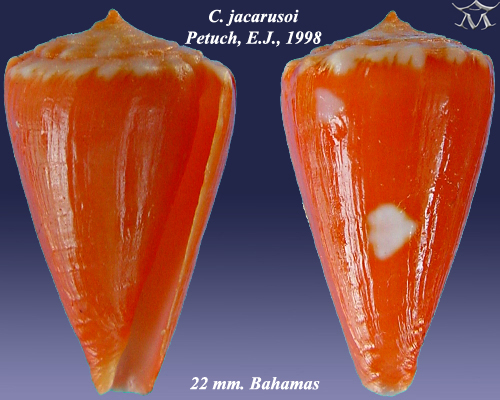

Scientific classification
- Kingdom: Animalia
- Phylum: Mollusca
- Class: Gastropoda
- Subclass: Caenogastropoda
- Order: Neogastropoda
- Superfamily: Conoidea
- Family: Conidae
- Genus: Conus
- Species: C. jacarusoi

Binomial name
- Conus jacarusoi Petuch, 1998

Synonyms
- Conus (Dauciconus) jacarusoi Petuch, 1998 · accepted, alternate representation; Magelliconus jacarusoi (Petuch, 1998); Purpuriconus jacarusoi (Petuch, 1998)

= Conus jacarusoi =

Species of sea snail

Conus jacarusoi is a species of sea snail, a marine gastropod mollusk in the family Conidae, the cone snails and their allies.

Like all species within the genus Conus, these snails are predatory and venomous. They are capable of stinging humans, therefore live ones should be handled carefully or not at all.

== Distribution ==
This marine species occurs off the Bahamas.

== Description ==
The maximum recorded shell length is 25 millimetres (0.98 in).

== Habitat ==
Minimum recorded depth is 15 metres (49 ft). Maximum recorded depth is also 15 metres (49 ft).
