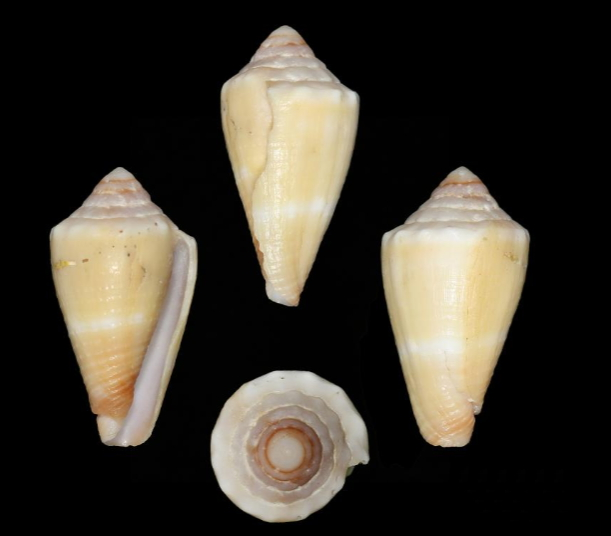
- Shell and protoconch of Conus harasewychi (holotype at the Smithsonian Institution)

Scientific classification
- Kingdom: Animalia
- Phylum: Mollusca
- Class: Gastropoda
- Subclass: Caenogastropoda
- Order: Neogastropoda
- Superfamily: Conoidea
- Family: Conidae
- Genus: Conus
- Species: C. harasewychi

Binomial name
- Conus harasewychi Petuch, 1987

Synonyms
- Conus (Dauciconus) harasewychi Petuch, 1987 · accepted, alternate representation; Purpuriconus harasewychi (Petuch, 1987)

= Conus harasewychi =

Species of sea snail

Conus harasewychi is a species of sea snail, a marine gastropod mollusk in the family Conidae, the cone snails, cone shells or cones.

These snails are predatory and venomous. They are capable of stinging humans.

== Description ==
Original description: "Shell stocky, solid, broad across shoulder; shoulder somewhat rounded, distinctly coronated with large raised knobs; body whorl with numerous fine, beaded, spiral cords; spiral cords become stronger on anterior half of shell; body whorl uniformly dark mustard-yellow with thin, amorphous white band around mid-body; shoulder coronations and spire whorls white in color; anterior tip of shell and siphonal region dark brown; interior of aperture pale lavender."

The size of the shell attains 26 mm.

== Distribution ==
Locus typicus: "North of Palm Beach Inlet, Palm Beach, Florida, USA."

This marine species occurs off Florida and the Bahamas at a depth of 30 m.
