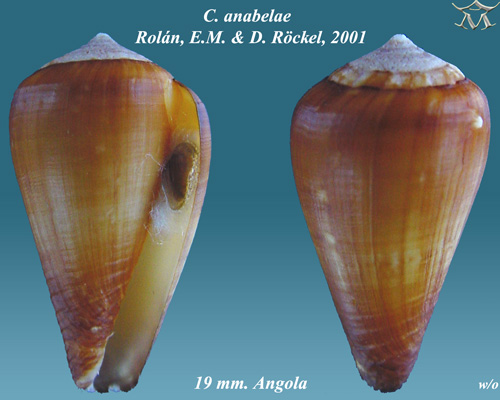
- Apertural and abapertural views of shell of Conus anabelae Rolán, E.M. & D. Röckel, 2001

Conservation status
- Least Concern (IUCN 3.1)

Scientific classification
- Kingdom: Animalia
- Phylum: Mollusca
- Class: Gastropoda
- Subclass: Caenogastropoda
- Order: Neogastropoda
- Superfamily: Conoidea
- Family: Conidae
- Genus: Conus
- Species: C. anabelae

Binomial name
- Conus anabelae Rolán & Röckel, 2001

Synonyms
- Conus (Lautoconus) anabelae Rolán & Röckel, 2001 · accepted, alternate representation; Varioconus anabelae (Rolán & Röckel, 2001)

= Conus anabelae =

Species of sea snail

Conus anabelae is a species of sea snail, a marine gastropod mollusk in the family Conidae, the cone snails and their allies.

Like all species within the genus Conus, these snails are predatory and venomous. They are capable of stinging humans, therefore live ones should be handled carefully or not at all.

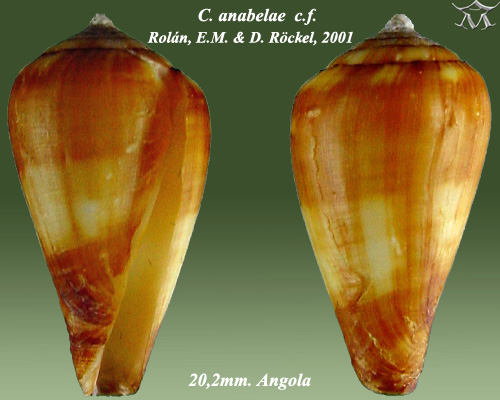
Conus anabelae cf. Rolán, E.M. & D. Röckel, 2001

== Description ==
The size of the shell varies between 15 mm and 30 mm.

== Distribution ==
This species occurs in the Atlantic Ocean off the coast of Angola.
