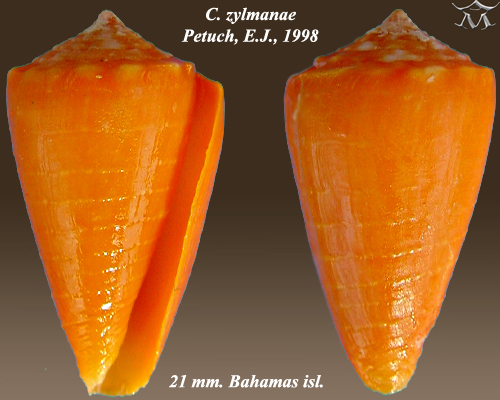
- Apertural and abapertural views of shell of Conus zylmanae Petuch, E.J., 1998
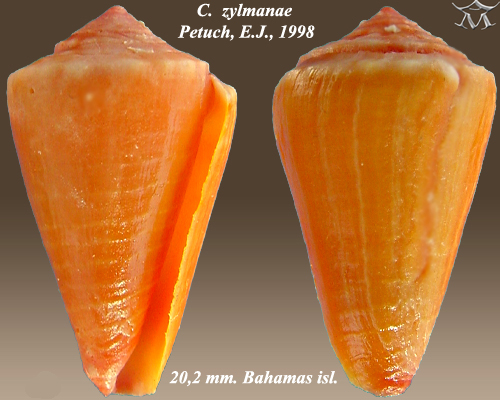

Conservation status
- Least Concern (IUCN 3.1)

Scientific classification
- Kingdom: Animalia
- Phylum: Mollusca
- Class: Gastropoda
- Subclass: Caenogastropoda
- Order: Neogastropoda
- Superfamily: Conoidea
- Family: Conidae
- Genus: Conus
- Species: C. zylmanae

Binomial name
- Conus zylmanae Petuch, 1998

Synonyms
- Conus (Dauciconus) zylmanae Petuch, 1998 · accepted, alternate representation; Purpuriconus zylmanae (Petuch, 1998)

= Conus zylmanae =

Species of sea snail

Conus zylmanae is a species of sea snail, a marine gastropod mollusk in the family Conidae, the cone snails and their allies.

Like all species within the genus Conus, these snails are predatory and venomous. They are capable of stinging humans, therefore live ones should be handled carefully or not at all.

== Distribution ==
This species occurs in the Atlantic Ocean off the Bahamas.

== Description ==
The maximum recorded shell length is 24 mm.

== Habitat ==
Minimum recorded depth is 6 m. Maximum recorded depth is 7 m.
