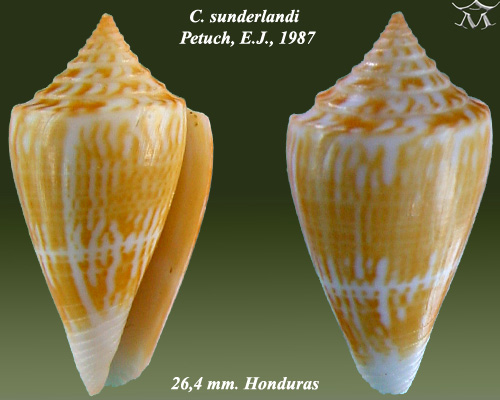
- Apertural and abapertural views of shell of Conus sunderlandi Petuch, E.J., 1987

Conservation status
- Least Concern (IUCN 3.1)

Scientific classification
- Kingdom: Animalia
- Phylum: Mollusca
- Class: Gastropoda
- Subclass: Caenogastropoda
- Order: Neogastropoda
- Superfamily: Conoidea
- Family: Conidae
- Genus: Conus
- Species: C. sunderlandi

Binomial name
- Conus sunderlandi Petuch, 1987

Synonyms
- Conus (Dauciconus) sunderlandi Petuch, 1987 · accepted, alternate representation; Gradiconus sunderlandi (Petuch, 1987)

= Conus sunderlandi =

Species of sea snail

Conus sunderlandi is a species of sea snail, a marine gastropod mollusk in the family Conidae, the cone snails and their allies.

Like all species within the genus Conus, these marine snails are predatory and venomous. They are capable of stinging humans, therefore live ones should be handled carefully or not at all.

== Description ==
Original description: "Shell stocky, solid, broad across shoulder; shoulder sharp-angled; body whorl smooth and shiny; anterior tip with several strong spiral cords; shell color white, overlaid with numerous close-packed rows of tiny, bright orange, vertical flammules; mid-body with white band; anterior tip white, with few scattered tiny, orange flammules; bands of orange vertical flammules sometimes coalesce to form solid orange, wide band (as in paratypes shown in Figures 15, 16); spire whorls white, with numerous, closely-packed, bright orange, crescent-shaped flammules; interior of aperture pink; periostracum thin, smooth, yellow."

The maximum recorded shell length is 33 mm.

== Distribution ==
Locus typicus: "Off Utila Isl, Bay Islands, Honduras."

This species occurs in the Caribbean Sea off Honduras.

== Habitat ==
Minimum recorded depth is 18 m. Maximum recorded depth is 18 m.
