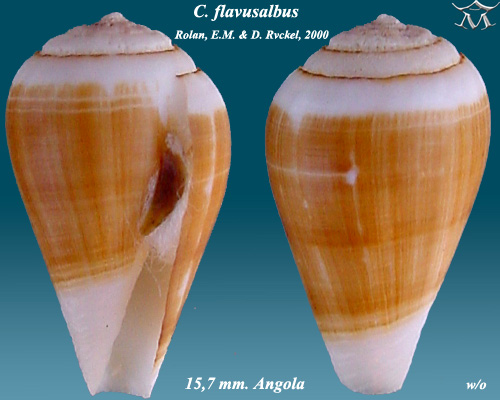
- Apertural and abapertural views of shell of Conus flavusalbus Rolan, E.M. & D. Rockel, 2000
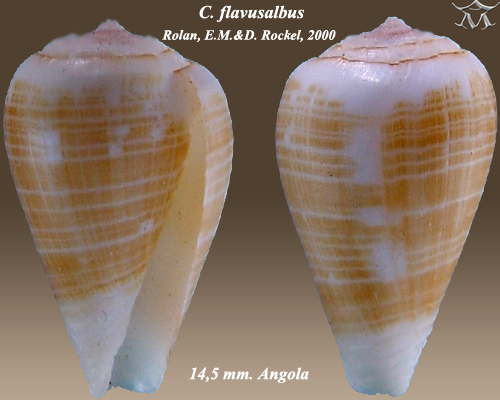

Conservation status
- Least Concern (IUCN 3.1)

Scientific classification
- Kingdom: Animalia
- Phylum: Mollusca
- Class: Gastropoda
- Subclass: Caenogastropoda
- Order: Neogastropoda
- Superfamily: Conoidea
- Family: Conidae
- Genus: Conus
- Species: C. flavusalbus

Binomial name
- Conus flavusalbus Rolán & Röckel, 2000

Synonyms
- Conus (Lautoconus) flavusalbus Rolán & Röckel, 2000 · accepted, alternate representation; Varioconus flavusalbus (Rolán & Röckel, 2000)

= Conus flavusalbus =

Species of sea snail

Conus flavusalbus is a species of sea snail, a marine gastropod mollusk in the family Conidae, the cone snails and their allies.

Like all species within the genus Conus, these snails are predatory and venomous. They are capable of stinging humans, therefore live ones should be handled carefully or not at all.

== Description ==
The size of the shell varies between 18 mm and 24 mm.

== Distribution ==
This species occurs in the Atlantic Ocean off Angola.
