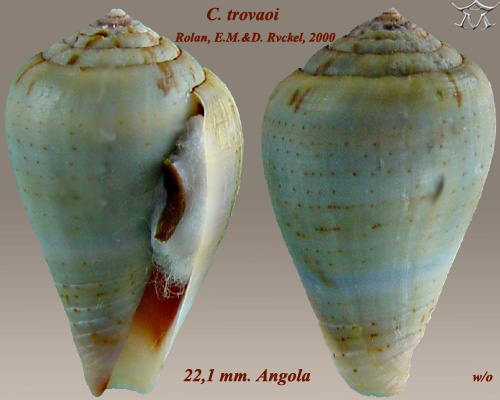
- Apertural and abapertural views of shell of Conus trovaoi Rolan, E.M. & D. Rockel, 2000
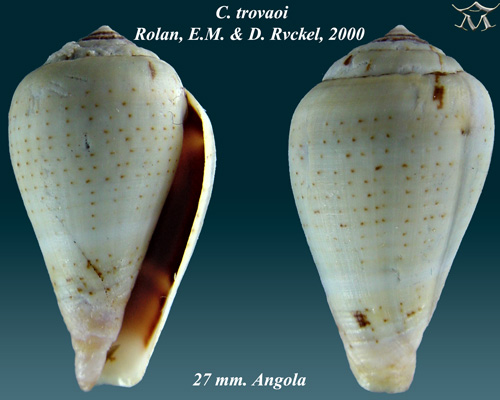

Conservation status
- Least Concern (IUCN 3.1)

Scientific classification
- Kingdom: Animalia
- Phylum: Mollusca
- Class: Gastropoda
- Subclass: Caenogastropoda
- Order: Neogastropoda
- Superfamily: Conoidea
- Family: Conidae
- Genus: Conus
- Species: C. trovaoi

Binomial name
- Conus trovaoi Rolán & Röckel, 2000

Synonyms
- Conus (Lautoconus) trovaoi Rolán & Röckel, 2000 · accepted, alternate representation; Varioconus trovaoi (Rolán & Röckel, 2000)

= Conus trovaoi =

Species of sea snail

Conus trovaoi is a species of sea snail, a marine gastropod mollusk in the family Conidae, the cone snails and their allies.

Like all species within the genus Conus, these snails are predatory and venomous. They are capable of stinging humans, therefore live ones should be handled carefully or not at all.

== Description ==
The length of the shell varies between 25 mm and 44 mm.

== Distribution ==
This species occurs in the Atlantic Ocean off Angola.
