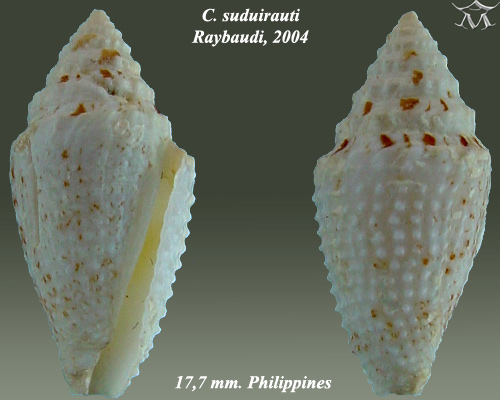
- Apertural and abapertural views of shell of Conus suduirauti Raybaudi, 2004
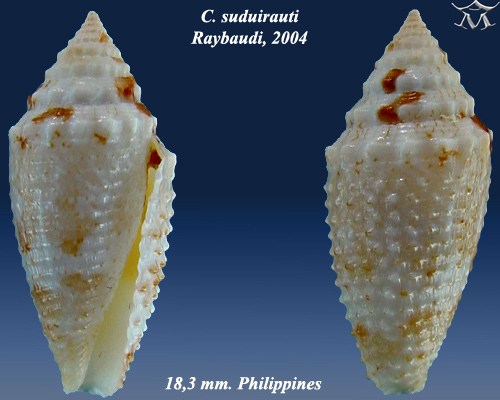

Conservation status
- Least Concern (IUCN 3.1)

Scientific classification
- Kingdom: Animalia
- Phylum: Mollusca
- Class: Gastropoda
- Subclass: Caenogastropoda
- Order: Neogastropoda
- Superfamily: Conoidea
- Family: Conidae
- Genus: Conus
- Species: C. suduirauti

Binomial name
- Conus suduirauti Raybaudi Massilia, 2004

Synonyms
- Conus (Strategoconus) suduirauti Raybaudi Massilia, 2004 · accepted, alternate representation; Rolaniconus suduirauti (Raybaudi Massilia, 2004)

= Conus suduirauti =

Species of sea snail

Conus suduirauti is a species of sea snail, a marine gastropod mollusk in the family Conidae, the cone snails and their allies.

Like all species within the genus Conus, these snails are predatory and venomous. They are capable of stinging humans, therefore live ones should be handled carefully or not at all.

== Description ==
The size of the shell varies between 16 mm and 24 mm.

== Distribution ==
Conus suduirauti is a marine species native to the Philippines.
