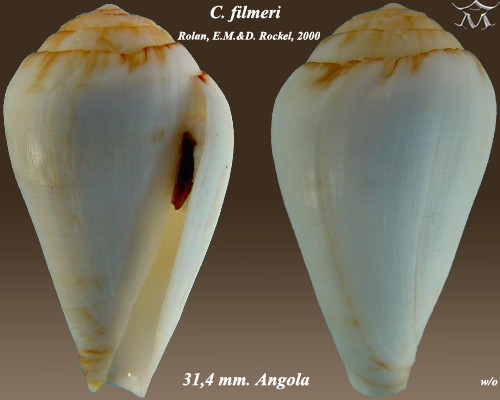
- Apertural and abapertural views of shell of Conus filmeri Rolan, E.M. & D. Röckel, 2000
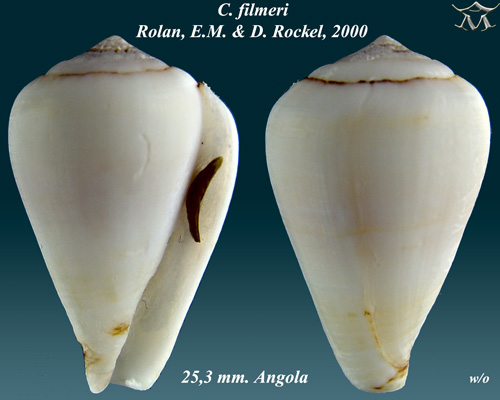

Conservation status
- Least Concern (IUCN 3.1)

Scientific classification
- Kingdom: Animalia
- Phylum: Mollusca
- Class: Gastropoda
- Subclass: Caenogastropoda
- Order: Neogastropoda
- Superfamily: Conoidea
- Family: Conidae
- Genus: Conus
- Species: C. filmeri

Binomial name
- Conus filmeri Rolán & Röckel, 2000

Synonyms
- Conus (Lautoconus) filmeri Rolán & Röckel, 2000 · accepted, alternate representation; Varioconus filmeri (Rolán & Röckel, 2000)

= Conus filmeri =

Species of sea snail

Conus filmeri is a species of sea snail, a marine gastropod mollusk in the family Conidae, the cone snails and their allies.

Like all species within the genus Conus, these snails are predatory and venomous. They are capable of stinging humans, therefore live ones should be handled carefully or not at all.

== Description ==
The size of the shell varies between 23 mm and 33 mm.

== Distribution ==
This species occurs in the Atlantic Ocean off Angola.
