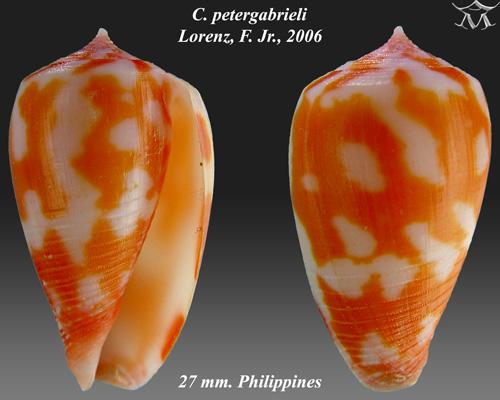
- Apertural and abapertural views of shell of Conus petergabrieli Lorenz, F. Jr., 2006
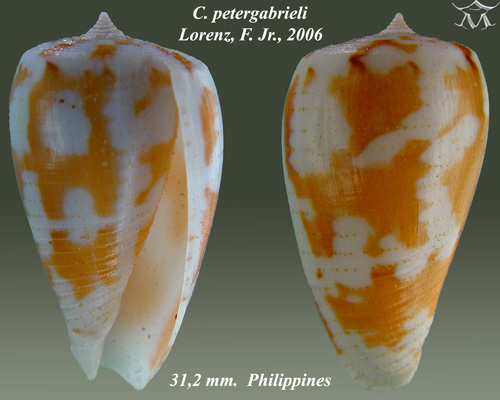

Scientific classification
- Kingdom: Animalia
- Phylum: Mollusca
- Class: Gastropoda
- Subclass: Caenogastropoda
- Order: Neogastropoda
- Superfamily: Conoidea
- Family: Conidae
- Genus: Conus
- Species: C. petergabrieli

Binomial name
- Conus petergabrieli Lorenz, 2006

Synonyms
- Asprella petergabrieli (Lorenz, 2006); Conus (Phasmoconus) petergrabrieli Lorenz, 2006 · accepted, alternate representation; Graphiconus petergabrieli (Lorenz, 2006)

= Conus petergabrieli =

Species of mollusc

Conus petergabrieli is a species of sea snail, a marine gastropod mollusk in the family Conidae, the cone snails and their allies.

Like all species within the genus Conus, these snails are predatory and venomous. They are capable of stinging humans, therefore live ones should be handled carefully or not at all.

== Description ==
The size of the shell varies between 20 mm and 45 mm.

== Distribution ==
This marine species occurs off the Philippines.
