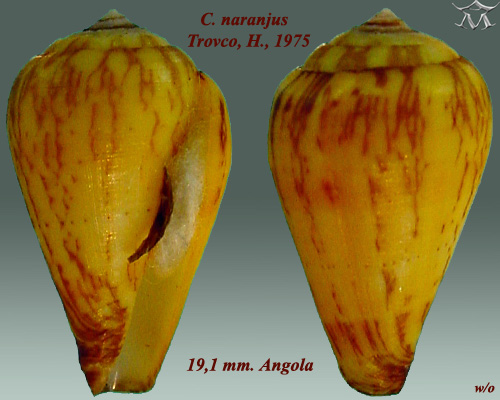
- Apertural and abapertural views of shell of Conus naranjus Trovão, H., 1975
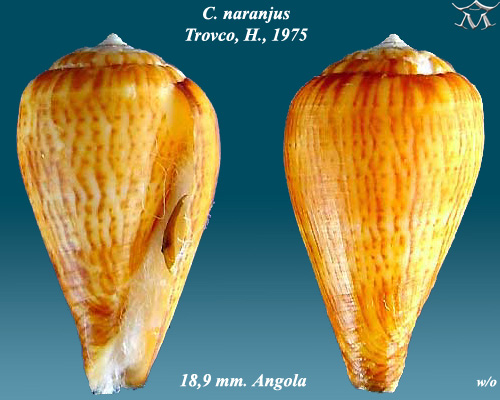

Conservation status
- Least Concern (IUCN 3.1)

Scientific classification
- Kingdom: Animalia
- Phylum: Mollusca
- Class: Gastropoda
- Subclass: Caenogastropoda
- Order: Neogastropoda
- Superfamily: Conoidea
- Family: Conidae
- Genus: Conus
- Species: C. naranjus

Binomial name
- Conus naranjus Trovão, 1975

Synonyms
- Conus (Lautoconus) naranjus Trovão, 1975 · accepted, alternate representation; Varioconus naranjus (Trovão, 1975)

= Conus naranjus =

Species of sea snail

Conus naranjus is a species of sea snail, a marine gastropod mollusk in the family Conidae, the cone snails and their allies.

Like all species within the genus Conus, these snails are predatory and venomous. They are capable of stinging humans, therefore live ones should be handled carefully or not at all.

== Description ==
The size of the shell varies between 15 mm and 25 mm.

== Distribution ==
This species occurs in the Atlantic Ocean off Angola.
