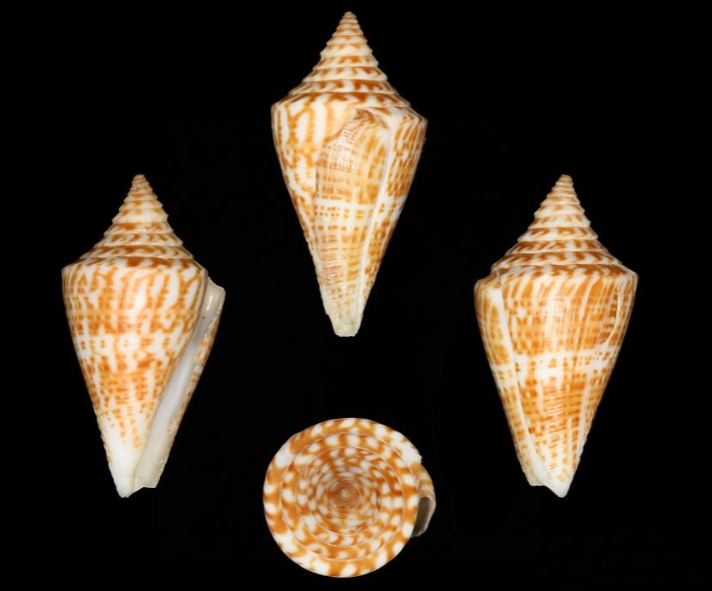
- Shell and protoconch of Conus ernesti (holotype at the Smithsonian Institution)

Scientific classification
- Kingdom: Animalia
- Phylum: Mollusca
- Class: Gastropoda
- Subclass: Caenogastropoda
- Order: Neogastropoda
- Superfamily: Conoidea
- Family: Conidae
- Genus: Conus
- Species: C. ernesti

Binomial name
- Conus ernesti Petuch, 1990

Synonyms
- Conus (Dauciconus) ernesti Petuch, 1990 · accepted, alternate representation; Gradiconus ernesti (Petuch, 1990)

= Conus ernesti =

Species of sea snail

Conus ernesti is a species of sea snail, a marine gastropod mollusk in the family Conidae, the cone snails, cone shells or cones.

These snails are predatory and venomous. They are capable of stinging humans.

== Description ==
The size of the shell varies between 20 mm and 31 mm.

== Distribution ==
This marine species of cone snail occurs in the Caribbean Sea off Panama at a depth of 65 m.
