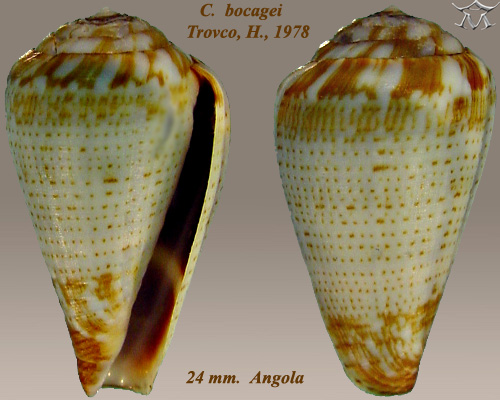
- Apertural and abapertural views of shell of Conus bocagei Trovco, H., 1978
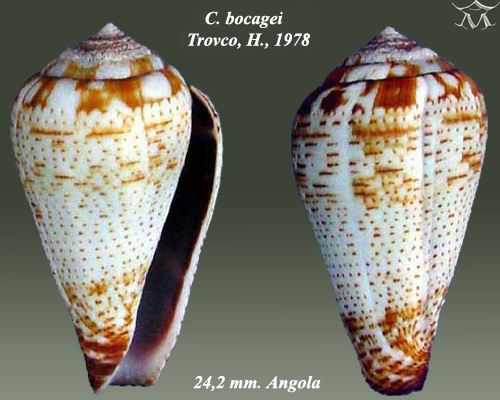

Scientific classification
- Kingdom: Animalia
- Phylum: Mollusca
- Class: Gastropoda
- Subclass: Caenogastropoda
- Order: Neogastropoda
- Superfamily: Conoidea
- Family: Conidae
- Genus: Conus
- Species: C. bocagei

Binomial name
- Conus bocagei Trovão, 1978

Synonyms
- Conus (Lautoconus) bocagei Trovão, 1978 · accepted, alternate representation; Varioconus bocagei (Trovão, 1978)

= Conus bocagei =

Species of sea snail

Conus bocagei is a species of sea snail, a marine gastropod mollusk in the family Conidae, the cone snails and their allies.

Like all species within the genus Conus, these snails are predatory and venomous. They are capable of stinging humans, therefore live ones should be handled carefully or not at all.

== Description ==
The size of the shell varies between 13 mm and 32 mm.

== Distribution ==
This species occurs in the Atlantic Ocean off Angola.
