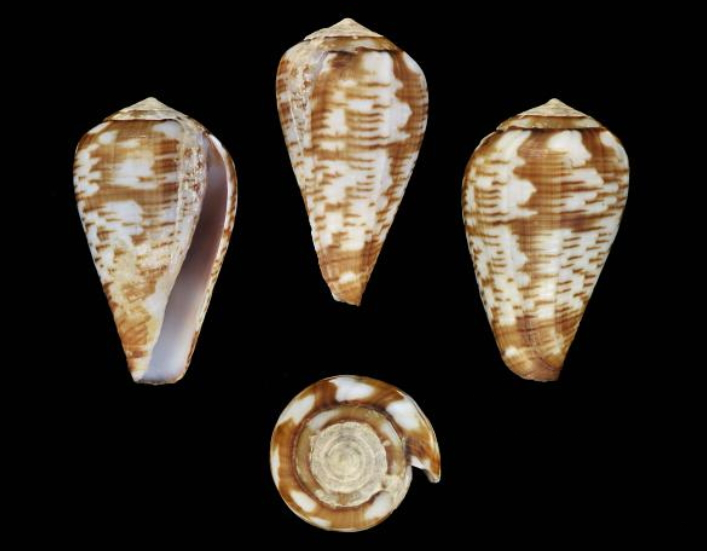
- Shell and protoconch of Conus lobitensis (lectotype at the Smithsonian Institution)

Scientific classification
- Kingdom: Animalia
- Phylum: Mollusca
- Class: Gastropoda
- Subclass: Caenogastropoda
- Order: Neogastropoda
- Superfamily: Conoidea
- Family: Conidae
- Genus: Conus
- Species: C. lobitensis

Binomial name
- Conus lobitensis Kaicher, 1977

Synonyms
- Conus (Lautoconus) lobitensis Kaicher, 1977 · accepted, alternate representation; Varioconus lobitensis (Kaicher, 1977)

= Conus lobitensis =

Species of sea snail

Conus lobitensis is a species of sea snail, a marine gastropod mollusk in the family Conidae, the cone snails, cone shells or cones.

These snails are predatory and venomous. They are capable of stinging humans.

The species was named after Lobito Bay, Angola.

== Distribution ==
This marine species occurs in the Atlantic Ocean off Angola.
