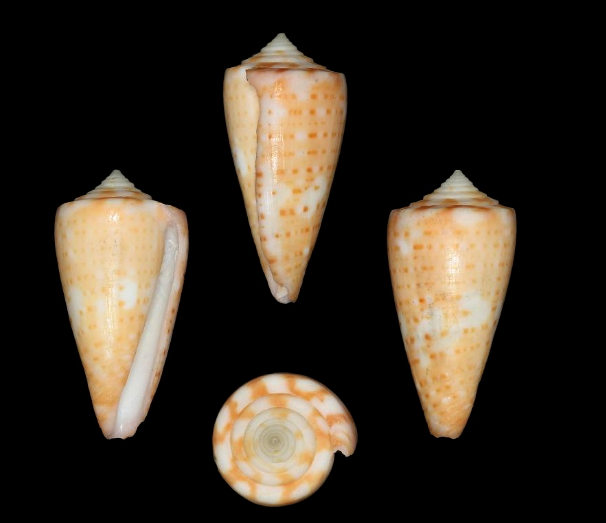
- Shell and protoconch of Conus patglicksteinae (holotype at the Smithsonian Institution)

Scientific classification
- Kingdom: Animalia
- Phylum: Mollusca
- Class: Gastropoda
- Subclass: Caenogastropoda
- Order: Neogastropoda
- Superfamily: Conoidea
- Family: Conidae
- Genus: Conus
- Species: C. patglicksteinae

Binomial name
- Conus patglicksteinae Petuch, 1987

Synonyms
- Conus (Dauciconus) patglicksteinae Petuch, 1987 · accepted, alternate representation; Conus floridanus patglicksteinae Petuch, 1987; Gradiconus patglicksteinae (Petuch, 1987)

= Conus patglicksteinae =

Species of sea snail

Conus patglicksteinae is a species of sea snail, a marine gastropod mollusk in the family Conidae, the cone snails, cone shells or cones.

These snails are predatory and venomous. They are capable of stinging humans.

== Description ==
The length of the holotype is 25.55 mm.

== Distribution ==
Locus typicus: "(Trawled from) 400 feet depth off Palm Beach Island, Palm Beach County, Florida, USA."

This marine species occurs in the Atlantic Ocean off Florida at a depth of 122 m.
