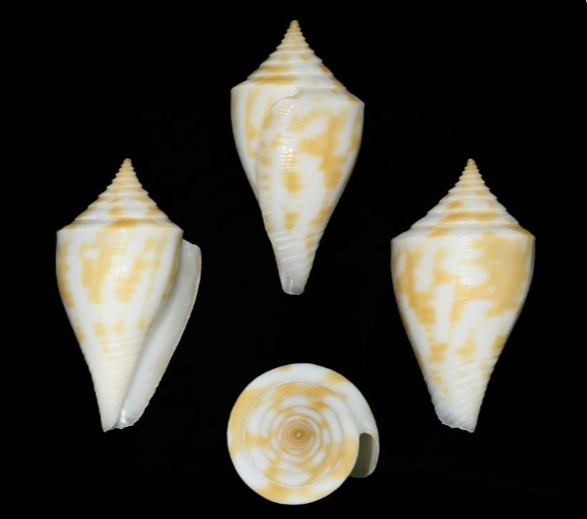
- Shell and protoconch of Conus rosemaryae (holotype at the Smithsonian Institution)

Conservation status
- Least Concern (IUCN 3.1)

Scientific classification
- Kingdom: Animalia
- Phylum: Mollusca
- Class: Gastropoda
- Subclass: Caenogastropoda
- Order: Neogastropoda
- Superfamily: Conoidea
- Family: Conidae
- Genus: Conus
- Species: C. rosemaryae

Binomial name
- Conus rosemaryae Petuch, 1990

Synonyms
- Conus (Dauciconus) rosemaryae Petuch, 1990 · accepted, alternate representation; Gradiconus rosemaryae (Petuch, 1990)

= Conus rosemaryae =

Species of sea snail

Conus rosemaryae is a species of sea snail, a marine gastropod mollusk in the family Conidae, the cone snails and their allies.

Like all species within the genus Conus, these marine snails are predatory and venomous. They are capable of stinging humans, therefore live ones should be handled carefully or not at all.

== Distribution ==
This species occurs in the Caribbean Sea from Nicaragua to Panama.

== Description ==
The maximum recorded shell length is 25 mm.

== Habitat ==
Minimum recorded depth is 85 m. Maximum recorded depth is 85 m.
