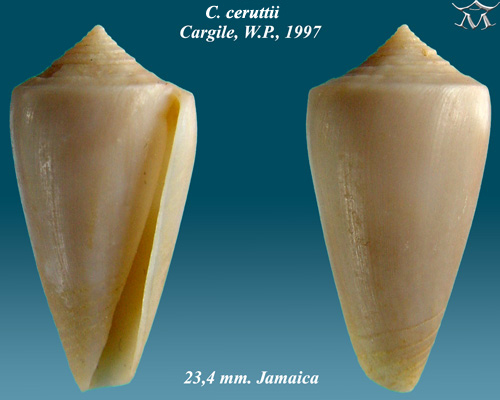
- Apertural and abapertural views of shell of Conus ceruttii Cargile, W.P., 1997

Conservation status
- Least Concern (IUCN 3.1)

Scientific classification
- Kingdom: Animalia
- Phylum: Mollusca
- Class: Gastropoda
- Subclass: Caenogastropoda
- Order: Neogastropoda
- Superfamily: Conoidea
- Family: Conidae
- Genus: Conus
- Species: C. ceruttii

Binomial name
- Conus ceruttii Cargile, 1997

Synonyms
- Conus (Dauciconus) ceruttii Cargile, 1997 · accepted, alternate representation; Gradiconus ceruttii (Cargile, 1997); Tuckericonus ceruttii (Cargile, 1997)

= Conus ceruttii =

Species of sea snail

Conus ceruttii is a species of sea snail, a marine gastropod mollusk in the family Conidae, the cone snails and their allies.

Like all species within the genus Conus, these snails are predatory and venomous. They are capable of stinging humans, therefore live ones should be handled carefully or not at all.

== Distribution ==
This species occurs in the Caribbean Sea off Nicaragua and Honduras.

== Description ==
The maximum recorded shell length is 40.3 mm.

== Habitat ==
Minimum recorded depth is 10 m. Maximum recorded depth is 25 m.
