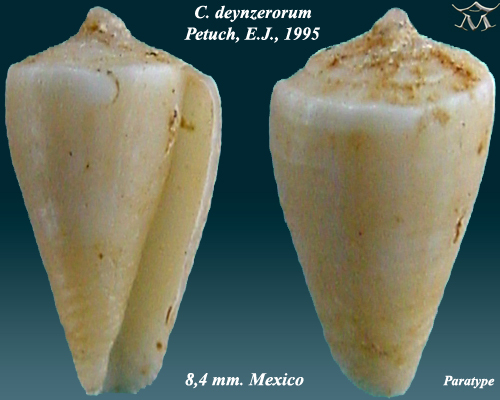
- Apertural and abapertural views of shell of Conus deynzerorum Petuch, E.J., 1995

Conservation status
- Least Concern (IUCN 3.1)

Scientific classification
- Kingdom: Animalia
- Phylum: Mollusca
- Class: Gastropoda
- Subclass: Caenogastropoda
- Order: Neogastropoda
- Superfamily: Conoidea
- Family: Conidae
- Genus: Conus
- Species: C. deynzerorum

Binomial name
- Conus deynzerorum Petuch, 1995

Synonyms
- Conus (Dauciconus) deynzerorum Petuch, 1995 · accepted, alternate representation; Purpuriconus deynzerorum (Petuch, 1995)

= Conus deynzerorum =

Species of sea snail

Conus deynzerorum is a species of sea snail described by Edward J. Petuch in 1995, a marine gastropod mollusk in the family Conidae, the cone snails and their allies.

Like all species within the genus Conus, these snails are predatory and venomous. They are capable of stinging humans, therefore live ones should be handled carefully or not at all.

== Distribution ==
This species occurs in the Caribbean Sea off Mexico.

== Description ==
The maximum recorded shell length is 13.5 mm.

== Habitat ==
Minimum recorded depth is 3 m. Maximum recorded depth is 3 m.
