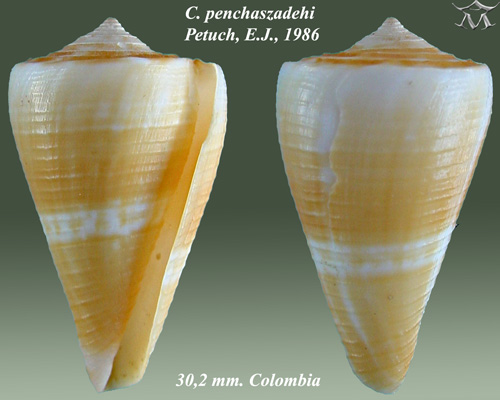
- Apertural and abapertural views of shell of Conus penchaszadehi Petuch, E.J., 1986

Conservation status
- Least Concern (IUCN 3.1)

Scientific classification
- Kingdom: Animalia
- Phylum: Mollusca
- Class: Gastropoda
- Subclass: Caenogastropoda
- Order: Neogastropoda
- Superfamily: Conoidea
- Family: Conidae
- Genus: Conus
- Species: C. penchaszadehi

Binomial name
- Conus penchaszadehi Petuch, 1986

Synonyms
- Conasprelloides penchaszadehi (Petuch, 1986); Conus (Dauciconus) penchaszadehi Petuch, 1986 · accepted, alternate representation

= Conus penchaszadehi =

Species of sea snail

Conus penchaszadehi is a species of sea snail, a marine gastropod mollusk in the family Conidae, the cone snails and their allies.

Like all species within the genus Conus, these snails are predatory and venomous. They are capable of stinging humans, therefore live ones should be handled carefully or not at all.

== Distribution ==
This species occurs in the Caribbean Sea off Colombia and Venezuela.

== Description ==
The maximum recorded shell length is 39 mm.

== Habitat ==
Minimum recorded depth is 21 m. Maximum recorded depth is 107 m.
