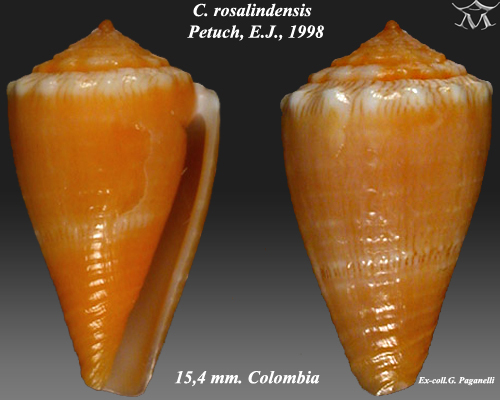
- Apertural and abapertural views of shell of Conus rosalindensis Petuch, E.J., 1998

Conservation status
- Least Concern (IUCN 3.1)

Scientific classification
- Kingdom: Animalia
- Phylum: Mollusca
- Class: Gastropoda
- Subclass: Caenogastropoda
- Order: Neogastropoda
- Superfamily: Conoidea
- Family: Conidae
- Genus: Conus
- Species: C. rosalindensis

Binomial name
- Conus rosalindensis Petuch, 1998

Synonyms
- Conus (Dauciconus) rosalindensis Petuch, 1998 · accepted, alternate representation; Purpuriconus rosalindensis (Petuch, 1998)

= Conus rosalindensis =

Species of sea snail

Conus rosalindensis is a species of sea snail, a marine gastropod mollusk in the family Conidae, the cone snails and their allies.

Like all species within the genus Conus, these snails are predatory and venomous. They are capable of stinging humans, therefore live ones should be handled carefully or not at all.

== Distribution ==
This species occurs in the Caribbean Sea from Honduras to Colombia.

== Description ==
The maximum recorded shell length is 26 mm.

== Habitat ==
Minimum recorded depth is 3 m. Maximum recorded depth is 3 m.
