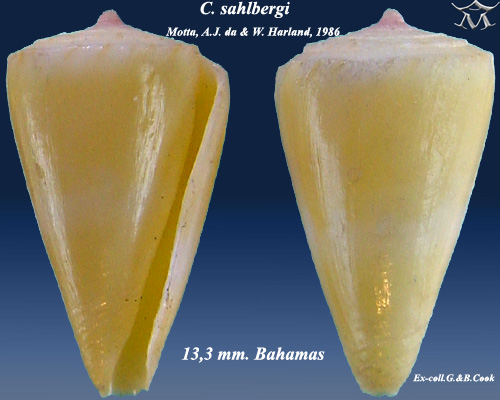
- Apertural and abapertural views of shell of Conus sahlbergi Motta, A.J. da & W. Harland, 1986

Scientific classification
- Kingdom: Animalia
- Phylum: Mollusca
- Class: Gastropoda
- Subclass: Caenogastropoda
- Order: Neogastropoda
- Superfamily: Conoidea
- Family: Conidae
- Genus: Conus
- Species: C. sahlbergi

Binomial name
- Conus sahlbergi da Motta & Harland, 1986

Synonyms
- Conus (Dauciconus) sahlbergi da Motta & Harland, 1986 · accepted, alternate representation; Purpuriconus sahlbergi (da Motta & Harland, 1986)

= Conus sahlbergi =

Species of sea snail

Conus sahlbergi is a species of sea snail, a marine gastropod mollusk in the family Conidae, the cone snails and their allies.

Like all species within the genus Conus, these snails are predatory and venomous. They are capable of stinging humans, therefore live ones should be handled carefully or not at all.

== Distribution ==
This marine species occurs off the Bahamas.

== Description ==
The maximum recorded shell length is 19 mm.

== Habitat ==
Minimum recorded depth is 3 m. Maximum recorded depth is 12 m.
