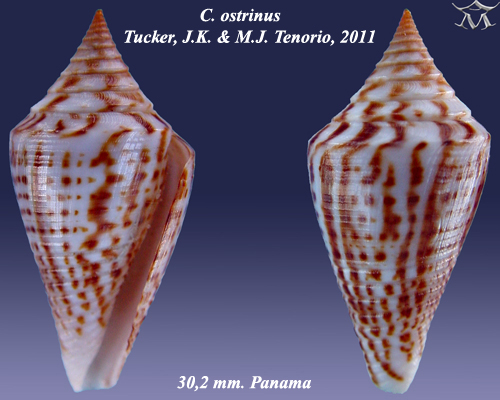
- Apertural and abapertural views of shell of Conus ostrinus Tucker, J.K. & M.J. Tenorio, 2011

Scientific classification
- Kingdom: Animalia
- Phylum: Mollusca
- Class: Gastropoda
- Subclass: Caenogastropoda
- Order: Neogastropoda
- Superfamily: Conoidea
- Family: Conidae
- Genus: Conus
- Species: C. ostrinus

Binomial name
- Conus ostrinus (Tucker & Tenorio, 2011)

Synonyms
- Conus (Dauciconus) ostrinus (Tucker & Tenorio, 2011) · accepted, alternate representation; Gradiconus ostrinus Tucker & Tenorio, 2011 (original combination)

= Conus ostrinus =

Species of sea snail

Conus ostrinus is a species of sea snail, a marine gastropod mollusk in the family Conidae, the cone snails and their allies.

Like all species within the genus Conus, these snails are predatory and venomous. They are capable of stinging humans, therefore live ones should be handled carefully or not at all.

== Description ==
The size of the shell varies between 8 mm and 33 mm.

== Distribution ==
This species occurs in the Caribbean Sea off Panama.
