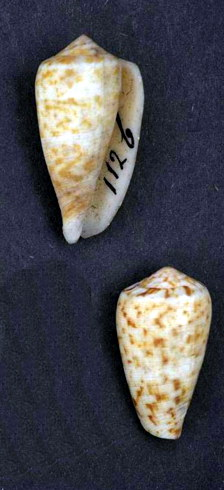
- Two views of a shell of Conus purissimus (museum specimens at Naturalis Biodiversity Center)

Scientific classification
- Kingdom: Animalia
- Phylum: Mollusca
- Class: Gastropoda
- Subclass: Caenogastropoda
- Order: Neogastropoda
- Superfamily: Conoidea
- Family: Conidae
- Genus: Conus
- Species: C. purissimus

Binomial name
- Conus purissimus Filmer, 2011

Synonyms
- Conus (Splinoconus) purissimus Filmer, 2011 · accepted, alternate representation; Conus lacteus Lamarck, 1810 (Invalid: junior secondary homonym of Cucullus lacteus Röding, 1798; Conus purissimus is a replacement name); Asprella purissimus (Filmer, 2011) (alternative representation); Graphiconus purissimus (Filmer, 2011)

= Conus purissimus =

Species of sea snail

Conus purissimus is a species of sea snail, a marine gastropod mollusk in the family Conidae, the cone snails and their allies.

Like all species within the genus Conus, these snails are predatory and venomous. They are capable of stinging humans, therefore live ones should be handled carefully or not at all.

== Description ==
The size of the shell varies between 25 mm and 48 mm.

== Distribution ==
This marine species occurs off Indonesia.
