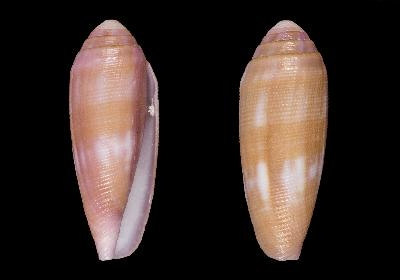
- Shell of Conus pomareae (holotype in MNHN, Paris)

Scientific classification
- Domain: Eukaryota
- Kingdom: Animalia
- Phylum: Mollusca
- Class: Gastropoda
- Subclass: Caenogastropoda
- Order: Neogastropoda
- Superfamily: Conoidea
- Family: Conidae
- Genus: Conus
- Species: C. pomareae

Binomial name
- Conus pomareae (Monnier & Limpalaër, 2014)

Synonyms
- Conus (Leporiconus) pomareae (Monnier & Limpalaër, 2014)· accepted, alternate representation; Conus tendineus var. granulosus G. B. Sowerby I, 1834 (invalid: junior homonym of Conus arenatus var. granulosa Lamarck, 1822); Leporiconus pomareae Monnier & Limpalaër, 2014

= Conus pomareae =

Species of sea snail

Conus pomareae is a species of sea snail, a marine gastropod mollusc in the family Conidae, the cone snails, cone shells or cones.

These snails are predatory and venomous. They are capable of stinging humans.

== Description ==
The length of the shell attains 24.7 mm.

== Distribution ==
This marine species occurs in the Pacific Ocean off the Society Islands .
