= Conus vanvilstereni =

Scientific classification
- Kingdom: Animalia
- Phylum: Mollusca
- Class: Gastropoda
- Subclass: Caenogastropoda
- Order: Neogastropoda
- Superfamily: Conoidea
- Family: Conidae
- Genus: Conus
- Species: C. vanvilstereni

Binomial name
- Conus vanvilstereni (Moolenbeek & Zandbergen, 2013)

Synonyms
- Conus (Splinoconus) vanvilstereni (Moolenbeek & Zandbergen, 2013) · accepted, alternate representation; Kioconus vanvilstereni Moolenbeek & Zandbergen, 2013

Species of sea snail

Conus vanvilstereni is a species of sea snail, a marine gastropod mollusk in the family Conidae, the cone snails, cone shells or cones.

These snails are predatory and venomous. They are capable of stinging humans.

== Description ==
The size of the shell attains 43 mm.

== Distribution ==
This marine species occurs in the Sulu Sea, Philippines.

== Bibliography ==
- Robert Moolenbeek and Arnold Zandbergen, Kioconus vanvilstereni, a new species from the Philippines (Gastropoda: Conidae); Miscellanea Malacologia 6(3)
- Puillandre, N.; Duda, T.F.; Meyer, C.; Olivera, B.M.; Bouchet, P. (2015). "One, four or 100 genera? A new classification of the cone snails". Journal of Molluscan Studies. 81 (1): 1–23. doi:10.1093/mollus/eyu055. PMC 4541476. PMID 26300576.
