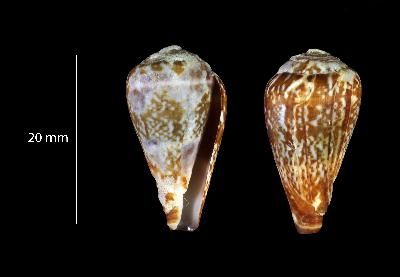
- Shell of Conus medvedevi (paratype in MNHN, Paris)

Scientific classification
- Kingdom: Animalia
- Phylum: Mollusca
- Class: Gastropoda
- Subclass: Caenogastropoda
- Order: Neogastropoda
- Superfamily: Conoidea
- Family: Conidae
- Genus: Conus
- Species: C. medvedevi

Binomial name
- Conus medvedevi (Monteiro, Afonso, Tenorio, Rosado & Pirinhas, 2014)

Synonyms
- Varioconus medvedevi Monteiro, Afonso, Tenorio, Rosado & Pirinhas, 2014 · accepted, alternate representation

= Conus medvedevi =

Species of sea snail

Conus medvedevi is a species of sea snail, a marine gastropod mollusc in the family Conidae, the cone snails, cone shells or cones.

These snails are predatory and venomous. They are capable of stinging humans.

== Description ==
The size of the shell varies between 15 mm and 30 mm. Its toothed radula is larger than that of its relatives.

== Distribution ==
This marine species occurs in the Atlantic Ocean and is endemic to Angola.
