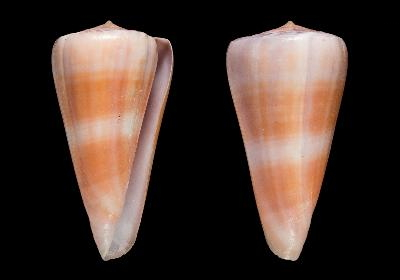
- Shell of Conus malabaricus (holotype in MNHN, Paris)

Scientific classification
- Kingdom: Animalia
- Phylum: Mollusca
- Class: Gastropoda
- Subclass: Caenogastropoda
- Order: Neogastropoda
- Superfamily: Conoidea
- Family: Conidae
- Genus: Conus
- Species: C. malabaricus

Binomial name
- Conus malabaricus (Monnier, Limpalaër & Tenorio, 2017)

Synonyms
- Conus (Virgiconus) malabaricus (Monnier, Limpalaër & Tenorio, 2017)· accepted, alternate representation; Virgiconus malabaricus Monnier, Limpalaër & Tenorio, 2017

= Conus malabaricus =

Species of sea snail

Conus malabaricus is a species of sea snail. It is a marine gastropod mollusc in the family Conidae, the cone snails, cone shells, or cones.

These snails are predatory and venomous. They are capable of stinging humans.

== Description ==
The length of the shell attains is around 55 mm.

Their feeding type is predatory.

== Distribution ==
This marine species occurs off Kerala, India.
