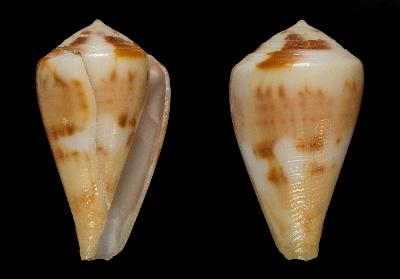
- Shells of Conus paulkersteni (holotype in MNHN, Paris)

Scientific classification
- Kingdom: Animalia
- Phylum: Mollusca
- Class: Gastropoda
- Subclass: Caenogastropoda
- Order: Neogastropoda
- Superfamily: Conoidea
- Family: Conidae
- Genus: Conus
- Species: C. paulkersteni

Binomial name
- Conus paulkersteni Petuch, 1988

Synonyms
- Conus (Rhizoconus) paulkersteni Thach, 2017· accepted, alternate representation; Conus kersteni Thach, 2017 (invalid: junior homonym of C. kersteni Tenorio, Afonso & Rolán, 2008; C. paulkersteni is a replacement name)

= Conus paulkersteni =

Species of sea snail

Conus paulkersteni is a species of sea snail, a marine gastropod mollusk in the family Conidae, the cone snails and their allies.

Like all species within the genus Conus, these snails are predatory and venomous. They are capable of stinging humans, therefore live ones should be handled carefully or not at all.

== Distribution ==
This marine species occurs off Vietnam.
