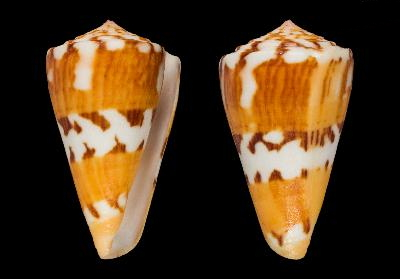
- Shell of Conus riosi (holotype in MNHN, Paris)

Scientific classification
- Kingdom: Animalia
- Phylum: Mollusca
- Class: Gastropoda
- Subclass: Caenogastropoda
- Order: Neogastropoda
- Superfamily: Conoidea
- Family: Conidae
- Genus: Conus
- Species: C. riosi

Binomial name
- Conus riosi Petuch, 1986

Synonyms
- Conus daucus riosi Petuch, 1986; Conus jacquescolombi (Monnier & Limpalaër, 2016); Dauciconus daucus riosi (Petuch, 1986); Dauciconus jacquescolombi Monnier & Limpalaër, 2016; Dauciconus riosi (Petuch, 1986)

= Conus riosi =

Species of sea snail

Conus riosi is a species of sea snail, a marine gastropod mollusc in the family Conidae, the cone snails, cone shells or cones.

This snail is predatory and venomous and is capable of stinging humans.

== Description ==
The length of the shell attains 40 mm.

== Distribution ==
This marine species of cone snail occurs off Martinique.
