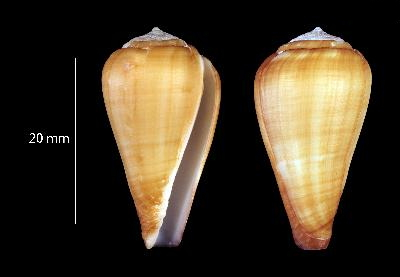
- Shell of Conus inesae (paratype in MNHN, Paris)

Scientific classification
- Kingdom: Animalia
- Phylum: Mollusca
- Class: Gastropoda
- Subclass: Caenogastropoda
- Order: Neogastropoda
- Superfamily: Conoidea
- Family: Conidae
- Genus: Conus
- Species: C. inesae

Binomial name
- Conus inesae (Monteiro, Afonso, Tenorio, Rosado & Pirinhas, 2014)

Synonyms
- Varioconus inesae Monteiro, Afonso, Tenorio, Rosado & Pirinhas, 2014 · accepted, alternate representation

= Conus inesae =

Species of sea snail

Conus inesae is a species of sea snail, a marine gastropod mollusc in the family Conidae, the cone snails, cone shells or cones.

These snails are predatory and venomous. They are capable of stinging humans.

== Description ==
The size of the shell varies between 25 mm and 36 mm.

== Distribution ==
This marine species occurs in the Atlantic Ocean and is endemic to Angola.
