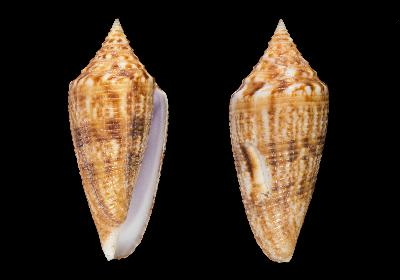
- Shell of Conus indomaris (holotype in MNHN, Paris)

Scientific classification
- Kingdom: Animalia
- Phylum: Mollusca
- Class: Gastropoda
- Subclass: Caenogastropoda
- Order: Neogastropoda
- Superfamily: Conoidea
- Family: Conidae
- Genus: Conus
- Species: C. indomaris

Binomial name
- Conus indomaris (Bozzetti, 2014)

Synonyms
- Graphiconus indomaris Bozzetti, 2014 · accepted, alternate representation

= Conus indomaris =

Species of sea snail

Conus indomaris is a species of sea snail, a marine gastropod mollusc in the family 'Conidae', the 'cone snails', 'cone shells' or 'cones'.

These snails are predatory and venomous. They are capable of stinging humans.

== Description ==
The size of the shell attains 45 mm.

Their functional type is benthos.

Their feeding type is predatory.

== Distribution ==
This marine species in the Central Indian Ocean and off Southwest India.
