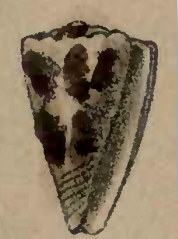
- Drawing of a shell of Conus maculiferus

Scientific classification
- Kingdom: Animalia
- Phylum: Mollusca
- Class: Gastropoda
- Subclass: Caenogastropoda
- Order: Neogastropoda
- Superfamily: Conoidea
- Family: Conidae
- Genus: Conus
- Species: C. maculiferus

Binomial name
- Conus maculiferus G. B. Sowerby I, 1833

Synonyms
- Conus (Dauciconus) maculiferus G. B. Sowerby I, 1833 · accepted, alternate representation; Purpuriconus maculiferus (G. B. Sowerby I, 1833)

= Conus maculiferus =

Species of sea snail

Conus maculiferus is a species of sea snail, a marine gastropod mollusk in the family Conidae, the cone snails, cone shells or cones.

These snails are predatory and venomous. They are capable of stinging humans.

== Description ==
The size of the shell attains 30 mm. The shell is wide, with a short spire and slightly coronate. Its color is yellowish white with two revolving series of irregular longitudinal chestnut markings, which are sometimes partially connected one with another in each series.

== Distribution ==
This marine species occurs in the Red Sea.
