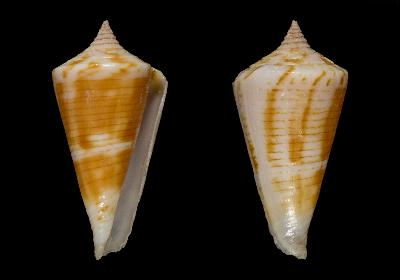
- Shell of Conus sakalava (holotype in MNHN, Paris)

Scientific classification
- Kingdom: Animalia
- Phylum: Mollusca
- Class: Gastropoda
- Subclass: Caenogastropoda
- Order: Neogastropoda
- Superfamily: Conoidea
- Family: Conidae
- Genus: Conus
- Species: C. sakalava

Binomial name
- Conus sakalava (Monnier & Tenorio, 2017)

Synonyms
- Kioconus sakalava Monnier & Tenorio, 2017 (original combination)

= Conus sakalava =

Species of sea snail

Conus sakalava is a species of sea snail, a marine gastropod mollusk in the family Conidae, the cone snails, cone shells or cones.

These snails are predatory and venomous. They are capable of stinging humans.

== Description ==
The length of the shell of the holotype measures 29.9 mm.

== Distribution ==
This marine species of cone snail occurs off Madagascar.
