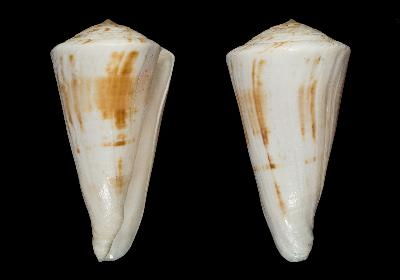
- Shell of Conus alrobini (holotype in MNHN, Paris)

Scientific classification
- Kingdom: Animalia
- Phylum: Mollusca
- Class: Gastropoda
- Subclass: Caenogastropoda
- Order: Neogastropoda
- Superfamily: Conoidea
- Family: Conidae
- Genus: Conus
- Species: C. alrobini

Binomial name
- Conus alrobini (Thach, 2016)

Synonyms
- Kioconus alrobini Thach, 2016 (original combination)

= Conus alrobini =

Species of sea snail

Conus alrobini is a species of sea snail, a marine gastropod mollusk in the family Conidae, the cone snails, cone shells or cones.

These snails are predatory and venomous. They are capable of stinging humans.

== Description ==
The length of the shell attains 105 mm.

== Distribution ==
This marine species of cone snail is endemic and occurs off Central Vietnam.
