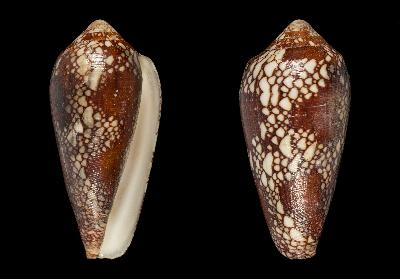
- Shell of Conus ngocngai (holotype in MNHN, Paris)

Scientific classification
- Kingdom: Animalia
- Phylum: Mollusca
- Class: Gastropoda
- Subclass: Caenogastropoda
- Order: Neogastropoda
- Superfamily: Conoidea
- Family: Conidae
- Genus: Conus
- Species: C. ngocngai

Binomial name
- Conus ngocngai Thach, 2017

= Conus ngocngai =

Species of sea snail

Conus ngocngai is a species of sea snail, a marine gastropod mollusk in the family Conidae, the cone snails, cone shells or cones.

These snails are predatory and venomous. They are capable of stinging humans.

== Description ==
The length of the shell attains 83 mm.

== Distribution ==
This marine species of cone snail is endemic to Vietnam.
