= Conus ruthae =

Scientific classification
- Domain: Eukaryota
- Kingdom: Animalia
- Phylum: Mollusca
- Class: Gastropoda
- Subclass: Caenogastropoda
- Order: Neogastropoda
- Superfamily: Conoidea
- Family: Conidae
- Genus: Conus
- Species: C. ruthae

Binomial name
- Conus ruthae (Monnier & Limpalaër, 2013)

Synonyms
- Conus (Splinoconus) ruthae (Monnier & Limpalaër, 2013) · accepted, alternate representation; Kioconus ruthae Monnier & Limpalaër, 2013

Species of sea snail

Conus ruthae is a species of sea snail, a marine gastropod mollusk in the family Conidae, the cone snails, cone shells or cones.

These snails are predatory and venomous. They are capable of stinging human by means of a small harpoon-like venomous stinger extruded through the shell opening.

The threat by snails to humans is limited as the primary habitat of the snails is in deeper waters (20-100m), so contact with humans other than divers is minimized.

== Description ==
The size of the shell varies between 40 mm and 54 mm.

== Distribution ==
This marine species occurs off the Philippines.
