= Conus conspersus =

Scientific classification
- Kingdom: Animalia
- Phylum: Mollusca
- Class: Gastropoda
- Subclass: Caenogastropoda
- Order: Neogastropoda
- Superfamily: Conoidea
- Family: Conidae
- Genus: Conus
- Species: C. conspersus

Binomial name
- Conus conspersus Reeve, 1844

Synonyms
- Asprella conspersa (Reeve, 1844); Conus (Phasmoconus) conspersus Reeve, 1844 · accepted, alternate representation; Graphiconus conspersus (Reeve, 1844)

Species of sea snail

Conus conspersus, common name the sprinkled cone, is a species of sea snail, a marine gastropod mollusk in the family Conidae, the cone snails and their allies.

Like all species within the genus Conus, these snails are predatory and venomous. They are capable of stinging humans.

== Description ==
During the 20th Century, the holotype was misplaced and thought to be lost, but has now (2022) been rediscovered and confirmed and is once again available to science.

The size of the shell varies between 24 mm and 56 mm.

== Distribution ==
This marine species occurs off the Philippines and Australia.
