= Conus brunneobandatus =

Scientific classification
- Kingdom: Animalia
- Phylum: Mollusca
- Class: Gastropoda
- Subclass: Caenogastropoda
- Order: Neogastropoda
- Superfamily: Conoidea
- Family: Conidae
- Genus: Conus
- Species: C. brunneobandatus

Binomial name
- Conus brunneobandatus Petuch, 1992

Synonyms
- Conasprelloides brunneobandatus (Petuch, 1992); Conus (Dauciconus) brunneobandatus Petuch, 1992 · accepted, alternate representation

Species of sea snail

Conus brunneobandatus is a species of sea snail, a marine gastropod mollusk in the family Conidae, the cone snails, cone shells or cones.

These snails are predatory and venomous. They are capable of stinging humans.

== Description ==
The size of the shell attains 36.5 mm.

== Distribution ==
Locus typicus: Off the mouth of the Orinoco River, Venezuela.

This species of cone snail occurs in the Caribbean Sea and off the Lesser Antilles; from Colombia to Northern Brazil.
