= Conus helgae =

Conservation status
- Least Concern (IUCN 3.1)

Scientific classification
- Kingdom: Animalia
- Phylum: Mollusca
- Class: Gastropoda
- Subclass: Caenogastropoda
- Order: Neogastropoda
- Superfamily: Conoidea
- Family: Conidae
- Genus: Conus
- Species: C. helgae

Binomial name
- Conus helgae Blöcher, 1992

Synonyms
- Asprella helgae (Blöcher, 1992); Conus (Asprella) helgae Blöcher, 1992 · accepted, alternate representation; Rolaniconus helgae (Blöcher, 1992)

Species of sea snail

Conus helgae is a species of sea snail, a marine gastropod mollusk in the family Conidae, the cone snails and their allies.

Like all species within the genus Conus, these snails are predatory and venomous. They are capable of stinging humans, therefore live ones should be handled carefully or not at all.

== Description ==
The size of the shell attains 40 mm (1.6 in).

== Distribution ==
This marine species occurs in the Indian Ocean off Madagascar.
