= Conus cingulatus =

Conservation status
- Least Concern (IUCN 3.1)

Scientific classification
- Kingdom: Animalia
- Phylum: Mollusca
- Class: Gastropoda
- Subclass: Caenogastropoda
- Order: Neogastropoda
- Superfamily: Conoidea
- Family: Conidae
- Genus: Conus
- Species: C. cingulatus

Binomial name
- Conus cingulatus Lamarck, 1810

Synonyms
- Conus (Dauciconus) cingulatus Lamarck, 1810 · accepted, alternate representation; Gradiconus cingulatus (Lamarck, 1810)

Species of sea snail

Conus cingulatus is a species of sea snail, a marine gastropod mollusk in the family Conidae, the cone snails and their allies.

Like all species within the genus Conus, these snails are predatory and venomous. They are capable of stinging humans, therefore live ones should be handled carefully or not at all.

== Description ==
The size of the shell varies between 25 mm and 50 mm.

== Distribution ==
This species occurs in the Caribbean Sea off Panama and Venezuela.
