= Conus skoglundae =

Scientific classification
- Kingdom: Animalia
- Phylum: Mollusca
- Class: Gastropoda
- Subclass: Caenogastropoda
- Order: Neogastropoda
- Superfamily: Conoidea
- Family: Conidae
- Genus: Conus
- Species: C. skoglundae

Binomial name
- Conus skoglundae (Tenorio, Tucker & Chaney, 2012)

Synonyms
- Conus (Dauciconus) skoglundae (Tenorio, Tucker & Chaney, 2012) · accepted, alternate representation; Gradiconus skoglundae Tenorio, Tucker & Chaney, 2012 (original combination)

Species of sea snail

Conus skoglundae is a species of sea snail, a marine gastropod mollusc in the family Conidae, the cone snails and their allies.

Like all species within the genus Conus, these snails are predatory and venomous. They are capable of stinging humans, therefore live ones should be handled carefully or not at all.

== Description ==
The size of the shell attains 25 mm.

== Distribution ==
This marine species occurs off Baja California, Mexico.
