= Conus empressae =

Conservation status
- Least Concern (IUCN 3.1)

Scientific classification
- Kingdom: Animalia
- Phylum: Mollusca
- Class: Gastropoda
- Subclass: Caenogastropoda
- Order: Neogastropoda
- Superfamily: Conoidea
- Family: Conidae
- Genus: Conus
- Species: C. empressae

Binomial name
- Conus empressae Lorenz, 2001

Synonyms
- Conus (Splinoconus) empressae Lorenz, 2001 accepted, alternate representation; Nitidoconus empressae (Lorenz, 2001) ·; Rolaniconus empressae (Lorenz, 2001)

Species of sea snail

Conus empressae is a species of sea snails, a marine gastropod mollusc in the family Conidae, the cone snails and their allies.

Like all species within the genus Conus, these snails are predatory and venomous. They are capable of stinging humans, therefore live ones should be handled carefully or not at all.

== Description ==
The size of the shell attains 25 mm.

== Distribution ==
This marine species occurs off the Philippines and Australia.
