= Conus ortneri =

Scientific classification
- Kingdom: Animalia
- Phylum: Mollusca
- Class: Gastropoda
- Subclass: Caenogastropoda
- Order: Neogastropoda
- Superfamily: Conoidea
- Family: Conidae
- Genus: Conus
- Species: C. ortneri

Binomial name
- Conus ortneri Petuch, 1998

Synonyms
- Conus (Dauciconus) ortneri Petuch, 1998 · accepted, alternate representation; Purpuriconus ortneri (Petuch, 1998)

Species of sea snail

Conus ortneri is a species of sea snail, a marine gastropod mollusk in the family Conidae, the cone snails and their allies.

Like all species within the genus Conus, these marine snails are predatory and venomous. They are capable of stinging humans, therefore live ones should be handled carefully or not at all.

== Distribution ==
This marine species occurs off the Bahamas.

== Description ==
The maximum recorded shell length is 25 mm.

== Habitat ==
Minimum recorded depth is 6 m. Maximum recorded depth is 7 m.
