= Conus devorsinei =

Scientific classification
- Kingdom: Animalia
- Phylum: Mollusca
- Class: Gastropoda
- Subclass: Caenogastropoda
- Order: Neogastropoda
- Superfamily: Conoidea
- Family: Conidae
- Genus: Conus
- Species: C. devorsinei

Binomial name
- Conus devorsinei (Petuch, Berschauer & Poremski, 2015)

Synonyms
- Conus (Tesselliconus) devorsinei (Petuch, Berschauer & Poremski, 2015)· accepted, alternate representation; Tesselliconus devorsinei Petuch, Berschauer & Poremski, 2015 (original combination)

Species of sea snail

Conus devorsinei is a species of sea snail, a marine gastropod mollusk in the family Conidae, the cone snails, cone shells or cones.

These snails are predatory and venomous. They are capable of stinging humans.

== Description ==
The length of the shell varies between 29 mm and 37 mm.

== Distribution ==
This marine species of cone snail is endemic to Australia and occurs off Queensland.
