= Conus edwardpauli =

Scientific classification
- Kingdom: Animalia
- Phylum: Mollusca
- Class: Gastropoda
- Subclass: Caenogastropoda
- Order: Neogastropoda
- Superfamily: Conoidea
- Family: Conidae
- Genus: Conus
- Species: C. edwardpauli

Binomial name
- Conus edwardpauli Petuch, 1998

Synonyms
- Conus (Dauciconus) edwardpauli Petuch, 1998 · accepted, alternate representation; Poremskiconus edwardpauli (Petuch, 1998); Purpuriconus edwardpauli (Petuch, 1998)

Species of sea snail

Conus edwardpauli is a species of sea snail, a marine gastropod mollusk in the family Conidae, the cone snails, cone shells or cones.

These snails are predatory and venomous. They are capable of stinging humans.

== Description ==
The size of the shell varies between 20 mm and 26 mm.

== Distribution ==
This marine species of cone snail occurs in the Caribbean Sea off Costa Rica to Colombia.
