= Conus buniatus =

Scientific classification
- Kingdom: Animalia
- Phylum: Mollusca
- Class: Gastropoda
- Subclass: Caenogastropoda
- Order: Neogastropoda
- Superfamily: Conoidea
- Family: Conidae
- Genus: Conus
- Species: C. buniatus

Binomial name
- Conus buniatus (Bozzetti, 2013)

Synonyms
- Conus (Strategoconus) buniatus (Bozzetti, 2013) accepted, alternate representation; Rolaniconus buniatus Bozzetti, 2013

Species of sea snail

Conus buniatus is a species of sea snail, a marine gastropod mollusk in the family Conidae, the cone snails, cone shells or cones.

These snails are predatory and venomous. They are capable of stinging humans.

The status of Conus buniatus is unaccepted, its accepted name is Conus varius Linnaeus.

== Description ==
When fully matured, the size of the shell attains 15 mm.

== Distribution ==
This marine species is found off Southern Madagascar.
