= Conus inconstans =

Scientific classification
- Kingdom: Animalia
- Phylum: Mollusca
- Class: Gastropoda
- Subclass: Caenogastropoda
- Order: Neogastropoda
- Superfamily: Conoidea
- Family: Conidae
- Genus: Conus
- Species: C. inconstans

Binomial name
- Conus inconstans E. A. Smith, 1877

Synonyms
- Conus (Dauciconus) inconstans E. A. Smith, 1877 · accepted, alternate representation; Purpuriconus inconstans (E. A. Smith, 1877)

Species of sea snail

Conus inconstans is a species of sea snail, a marine gastropod mollusk in the family Conidae, the cone snails and their allies.

Like all species within the genus Conus, these snails are predatory and venomous. They are capable of stinging humans, therefore live ones should be handled carefully or not at all.

== Description ==
The size of the shell varies between 22 mm and 28 mm.

== Distribution ==
This species occurs in the Caribbean Sea off Panama.
