= Conus malcolmi =

Scientific classification
- Kingdom: Animalia
- Phylum: Mollusca
- Class: Gastropoda
- Subclass: Caenogastropoda
- Order: Neogastropoda
- Superfamily: Conoidea
- Family: Conidae
- Genus: Conus
- Species: C. malcolmi

Binomial name
- Conus malcolmi (Monnier & Limpalaër, 2015)

Synonyms
- Conus (Splinoconus) malcolmi (Monnier & Limpalaër, 2015) · accepted, alternate representation; Kioconus malcolmi Monnier & Limpalaër, 2015 (original combination)

Species of sea snail

Conus malcolmi is a species of sea snail, a marine gastropod mollusc in the family Conidae, the cone snails, cone shells or cones.

These snails are predatory and venomous. They are capable of stinging humans.

== Description ==
The size of the shell varies between 11 mm and 30 mm.

== Distribution ==
This marine species occurs in the Red Sea.
