= Conus nahoonensis =

Scientific classification
- Kingdom: Animalia
- Phylum: Mollusca
- Class: Gastropoda
- Subclass: Caenogastropoda
- Order: Neogastropoda
- Superfamily: Conoidea
- Family: Conidae
- Genus: Conus
- Species: C. nahoonensis

Binomial name
- Conus nahoonensis (S. G. Veldsman, 2016)

Synonyms
- Conus (Sciteconus) nahoonensis (S. G. Veldsman, 2016)· accepted, alternate representation; Sciteconus nahoonensis S. G. Veldsman, 2016 (original combination)

Species of sea snail

Conus nahoonensis is a species of sea snail, a marine gastropod mollusk in the family Conidae, the cone snails, cone shells or cones.

These snails are predatory and venomous. They are capable of stinging humans.

== Distribution ==
This marine species of cone snail is endemic to South Africa and occurs off the East Coast Province.
