= Conus daphne =

Scientific classification
- Kingdom: Animalia
- Phylum: Mollusca
- Class: Gastropoda
- Subclass: Caenogastropoda
- Order: Neogastropoda
- Superfamily: Conoidea
- Family: Conidae
- Genus: Conus
- Species: C. daphne

Binomial name
- Conus daphne Boivin, 1864

Synonyms
- Asprella daphne Boivin, 1864; Conus (Phasmoconus) daphne Boivin, 1864 · accepted, alternate representation

Species of sea snail

Conus daphne is a species of sea snail, a marine gastropod mollusk in the family Conidae, the cone snails and their allies.

Like all species within the genus Conus, these snails are predatory and venomous. They are capable of stinging humans, therefore live ones should be handled carefully or not at all.

== Description ==
The size of the shell varies between 23 mm and 52 mm.

== Distribution ==
This marine species occurs off Eastern Indonesia.
