= Conus carioca =

Scientific classification
- Kingdom: Animalia
- Phylum: Mollusca
- Class: Gastropoda
- Subclass: Caenogastropoda
- Order: Neogastropoda
- Superfamily: Conoidea
- Family: Conidae
- Genus: Conus
- Species: C. carioca

Binomial name
- Conus carioca Petuch, 1986

Synonyms
- Conus (Sandericonus) carioca Petuch, 1986 · accepted, alternate representation; Sandericonus carioca (Petuch, 1986)

Species of sea snail

Conus carioca is a species of sea snail, a marine gastropod mollusk in the family Conidae, the cone snails, cone shells or cones.

These snails are predatory and venomous. They are capable of stinging humans.

== Description ==
The size of the shell varies between 36 mm and 57 mm.

== Distribution ==
Trawled at 35-40 m., this marine species occurs in the Atlantic Ocean off Eastern Brazil.
