= Conus coltrorum =

Scientific classification
- Kingdom: Animalia
- Phylum: Mollusca
- Class: Gastropoda
- Subclass: Caenogastropoda
- Order: Neogastropoda
- Superfamily: Conoidea
- Family: Conidae
- Genus: Conus
- Species: C. coltrorum

Binomial name
- Conus coltrorum (Petuch & R. F. Myers, 2014)

Synonyms
- Conasprelloides coltrorum Petuch & R. F. Myers, 2014 (original combination); Conus (Dauciconus) coltrorum (Petuch & R. F. Myers, 2014) · accepted, alternate representation

Species of sea snail

Conus coltrorum is a species of sea snail, a marine gastropod mollusk in the family Conidae, the cone snails, cone shells or cones.

These snails are predatory and venomous. They are capable of stinging humans.

== Distribution ==
This species of cone snail occurs in the Caribbean Sea.
