= Conus pseudocedonulli =

Scientific classification
- Domain: Eukaryota
- Kingdom: Animalia
- Phylum: Mollusca
- Class: Gastropoda
- Subclass: Caenogastropoda
- Order: Neogastropoda
- Superfamily: Conoidea
- Family: Conidae
- Genus: Conus
- Species: C. pseudocedonulli

Binomial name
- Conus pseudocedonulli Blainville, 1818

Synonyms
- Conus (Cylinder) pseudocedonulli Blainville, 1818; Conus ammiralis pseudocedonulli Blainville, 1818; Conus blainvillii Vignard, 1829; Conus hereditarius da Motta, 1987

Species of gastropod

Conus pseudocedonulli is a species of sea snail, a marine gastropod mollusk, in the family Conidae, the cone snails and their allies.

== Description ==
Shell size 50 mm.

== Distribution ==
Indonesia.
