= Conus ednae =

Scientific classification
- Kingdom: Animalia
- Phylum: Mollusca
- Class: Gastropoda
- Subclass: Caenogastropoda
- Order: Neogastropoda
- Superfamily: Conoidea
- Family: Conidae
- Genus: Conus
- Species: C. ednae

Binomial name
- Conus ednae (Petuch, 2013)

Synonyms
- Conus (Sandericonus) ednae (Petuch, 2013) · accepted, alternate representation; Sandericonus ednae Petuch, 2013 (original combination)

Species of sea snail

Conus ednae is a species of sea snail, a marine gastropod mollusk in the family Conidae, the cone snails, cone shells or cones.

These snails are predatory and venomous, and are capable of stinging humans.

== Description ==
The size of the shell attains 29 mm.

== Distribution ==
This marine species of cone snail occurs off Brazil.
