= Conus smoesi =

Scientific classification
- Kingdom: Animalia
- Phylum: Mollusca
- Class: Gastropoda
- Subclass: Caenogastropoda
- Order: Neogastropoda
- Superfamily: Conoidea
- Family: Conidae
- Genus: Conus
- Species: C. smoesi

Binomial name
- Conus smoesi (Petuch & Berschauer, 2016)

Synonyms
- Poremskiconus smoesi Petuch & Berschauer, 2016 (original combination)

Species of sea snail

Conus smoesi is a species of sea snail, a marine gastropod mollusk in the family Conidae, the cone snails, cone shells or cones.

These snails are predatory and venomous. They are capable of stinging humans.

== Description ==
The length of the shell attains 20 mm.

== Distribution ==
This marine species of cone snail occurs off the Ceará State, Northeast Brazil.
