= Conus rosi =

Scientific classification
- Kingdom: Animalia
- Phylum: Mollusca
- Class: Gastropoda
- Subclass: Caenogastropoda
- Order: Neogastropoda
- Superfamily: Conoidea
- Family: Conidae
- Genus: Conus
- Species: C. rosi

Binomial name
- Conus rosi (Petuch & Berschauer, 2015)

Synonyms
- Tenorioconus rosi Petuch & Berschauer, 2015 (original combination)

Species of sea snail

Conus rosi is a species of sea snail, a marine gastropod mollusc in the family Conidae, the cone snails, cone shells or cones.

These snails are predatory and venomous. They are capable of stinging humans.

== Description ==
The length of the shell varies between 13 mm and 23 mm.

== Distribution ==
This marine species occurs in the Caribbean Sea off Aruba.
