= Conus platensis =

Conservation status
- Extinct (IUCN 3.1)

Scientific classification
- Kingdom: Animalia
- Phylum: Mollusca
- Class: Gastropoda
- Subclass: Caenogastropoda
- Order: Neogastropoda
- Superfamily: Conoidea
- Family: Conidae
- Genus: Conus
- Species: †C. platensis

Binomial name
- †Conus platensis Frenguelli, 1946

Synonyms
- † Conus (Leptoconus) platensis Frenguelli, 1946

Species of sea snail

Conus platensis is an extinct species of sea snail, a marine gastropod mollusk in the family Conidae, the cone snails and their allies.

== Description ==
The size of the shell attains 23 mm.

== Distribution ==
This species was found as a fossil off Platense de Punta Carreta, Montevideo, Uruguay.
