= Conus mariaodeteae =

Scientific classification
- Kingdom: Animalia
- Phylum: Mollusca
- Class: Gastropoda
- Subclass: Caenogastropoda
- Order: Neogastropoda
- Superfamily: Conoidea
- Family: Conidae
- Genus: Conus
- Species: C. mariaodeteae

Binomial name
- Conus mariaodeteae (Petuch & R. F. Myers, 2014)

Synonyms
- Poremskiconus mariaodeteae Petuch & Myers, 2014

Species of sea snail

Conus mariaodeteae is a species of sea snail, a marine gastropod mollusc in the family Conidae, the cone snails, cone shells or cones.

These snails are predatory and venomous. They are capable of stinging humans.

== Distribution ==
This marine species in the Atlantic Ocean off Brazil.
