= Conus tonisii =

Scientific classification
- Kingdom: Animalia
- Phylum: Mollusca
- Class: Gastropoda
- Subclass: Caenogastropoda
- Order: Neogastropoda
- Superfamily: Conoidea
- Family: Conidae
- Genus: Conus
- Species: C. tonisii

Binomial name
- Conus tonisii (Petuch & R. F. Myers, 2014)

Synonyms
- Poremskiconus tonisii Petuch & Myers, 2014 accepted, alternate representation

Species of sea snail

Conus tonisii is a species of sea snail of the family Conidae. The species is predatory and venomous. They are capable of stinging humans.

== Description ==
As a sea snail, Conus tonisii has a shell and lives underwater.

== Distribution ==
This marine species can be found off the coast of Brazil.
