= Conus aliwalensis =

Scientific classification
- Domain: Eukaryota
- Kingdom: Animalia
- Phylum: Mollusca
- Class: Gastropoda
- Subclass: Caenogastropoda
- Order: Neogastropoda
- Superfamily: Conoidea
- Family: Conidae
- Genus: Conus
- Species: C. aliwalensis

Binomial name
- Conus aliwalensis (S. G. Veldsman, 2018)

Synonyms
- Conus (Pionoconus) aliwalensis (S. G. Veldsman, 2018); Pionoconus aliwalensis S. G. Veldsman, 2018

Species of gastropod

Conus aliwalensis is a species of sea snail, a marine gastropod mollusk, in the family Conidae, the cone snails and their allies.
