= Conus corbieri =

Scientific classification
- Domain: Eukaryota
- Kingdom: Animalia
- Phylum: Mollusca
- Class: Gastropoda
- Subclass: Caenogastropoda
- Order: Neogastropoda
- Superfamily: Conoidea
- Family: Conidae
- Genus: Conus
- Species: C. corbieri

Binomial name
- Conus corbieri Blöcher, 1994

Synonyms
- Conus (Darioconus) corbieri Blöcher, 1994; Conus pennaceus corbieri Blöcher, 1994; Darioconus corbieri (Blöcher, 1994)

Species of gastropod

Conus corbieri is a species of sea snail, a marine gastropod mollusk, in the family Conidae, the cone snails and their allies.
