= Conus solidus =

Scientific classification
- Domain: Eukaryota
- Kingdom: Animalia
- Phylum: Mollusca
- Class: Gastropoda
- Subclass: Caenogastropoda
- Order: Neogastropoda
- Superfamily: Conoidea
- Family: Conidae
- Genus: Conus
- Species: C. solidus

Binomial name
- Conus solidus Gmelin, 1791

Species of sea snail

Conus solidus is a species of sea snail, a marine gastropod mollusk in the family Conidae, the cone snails, cone shells or cones. It is predatory, venomous and capable of stinging humans. Shell length varies between 36 mm and 67 mm. It occurs in the Caribbean Sea off Venezuela, Trinidad and Barbados
