= Conus vezzaronellyae =

Scientific classification
- Kingdom: Animalia
- Phylum: Mollusca
- Class: Gastropoda
- Subclass: Caenogastropoda
- Order: Neogastropoda
- Superfamily: Conoidea
- Family: Conidae
- Genus: Conus
- Species: C. vezzaronellyae

Binomial name
- Conus vezzaronellyae (Cossignani, 2018)

Synonyms
- Conus (Cylinder) vezzaronellyae (Cossignani, 2018); Cylinder vezzaronellyae Cossignani, 2018

Species of gastropod

Conus vezzaronellyae is a species of sea snail, a marine gastropod mollusk, in the family Conidae, the cone snails and their allies.
