= Conus molis =

Scientific classification
- Kingdom: Animalia
- Phylum: Mollusca
- Class: Gastropoda
- Subclass: Caenogastropoda
- Order: Neogastropoda
- Superfamily: Conoidea
- Family: Conidae
- Genus: Conus
- Species: †C. molis

Binomial name
- †Conus molis A. P. Brown & Pilsbry, 1911

Synonyms
- Conus (Pyruconus) molis A. P. Brown & Pilsbry, 1911; Conus concavitectum A. P. Brown & Pilsbry, 1911

Extinct species of gastropod

Conus molis is an extinct species of sea snail, a marine gastropod mollusk, in the family Conidae, the cone snails and their allies.
