= Conus aemulator =

Conus aemulator Temporal range: Miocene

Scientific classification
- Kingdom: Animalia
- Phylum: Mollusca
- Class: Gastropoda
- Subclass: Caenogastropoda
- Order: Neogastropoda
- Superfamily: Conoidea
- Family: Conidae
- Genus: Conus
- Species: †C. aemulator

Binomial name
- †Conus aemulator A. P. Brown & Pilsbry, 1911

Synonyms
- Conus veatchi Olsson, 1922

Species of sea snail

Conus aemulator is an extinct species of sea snail, a marine gastropod mollusk, in the family Conidae, the cone snails and their allies.

== Distribution ==
This species occurs in Panama.
