= Conus nanshaensis =

Scientific classification
- Kingdom: Animalia
- Phylum: Mollusca
- Class: Gastropoda
- Subclass: Caenogastropoda
- Order: Neogastropoda
- Superfamily: Conoidea
- Family: Conidae
- Genus: Conus
- Species: C. nanshaensis

Binomial name
- Conus nanshaensis F.-L. Li, 2016

Species of sea snail

Conus nanshaensis is a species of sea snail, a marine gastropod mollusc in the family Conidae, the cone snails, cone shells or cones.

This snail is predatory and venomous and is capable of stinging humans.

== Distribution ==
This marine species of cone snail occurs off the Spratly Islands, the South China Sea.
