= Conus taphrus =

Scientific classification
- Domain: Eukaryota
- Kingdom: Animalia
- Phylum: Mollusca
- Class: Gastropoda
- Subclass: Caenogastropoda
- Order: Neogastropoda
- Superfamily: Conoidea
- Family: Conidae
- Genus: Conus
- Species: †C. taphrus

Binomial name
- †Conus taphrus Woodring, 1970

Synonyms
- Conus (Dauciconus) taphrus Woodring, 1970

Extinct species of gastropod

Conus taphrus is an extinct species of sea snail, a marine gastropod mollusk, in the family Conidae, the cone snails and their allies.

== Distribution ==
This species occurs in Panama.
