= Conus furvoides =

Scientific classification
- Domain: Eukaryota
- Kingdom: Animalia
- Phylum: Mollusca
- Class: Gastropoda
- Subclass: Caenogastropoda
- Order: Neogastropoda
- Superfamily: Conoidea
- Family: Conidae
- Genus: Conus
- Species: †C. furvoides

Binomial name
- †Conus furvoides Gabb, 1873

Synonyms
- Conus (Dauciconus) furvoides Gabb, 1873

Extinct species of gastropod

Conus furvoides is an extinct species of sea snail, a marine gastropod mollusk, in the family Conidae, the cone snails and their allies.
