= Conus clavatulus =

Scientific classification
- Kingdom: Animalia
- Phylum: Mollusca
- Class: Gastropoda
- Subclass: Caenogastropoda
- Order: Neogastropoda
- Superfamily: Conoidea
- Family: Conidae
- Genus: Conus
- Species: †C. clavatulus

Binomial name
- †Conus clavatulus d'Orbigny, 1852

Synonyms
- Conus (Lautoconus) clavatulus d'Orbigny, 1852

Extinct species of gastropod

Conus clavatulus is an extinct species of sea snail, a marine gastropod mollusk, in the family Conidae, the cone snails and their allies.
