= Conus vezzarochristophei =

Scientific classification
- Kingdom: Animalia
- Phylum: Mollusca
- Class: Gastropoda
- Subclass: Caenogastropoda
- Order: Neogastropoda
- Superfamily: Conoidea
- Family: Conidae
- Genus: Conus
- Species: C. vezzarochristophei

Binomial name
- Conus vezzarochristophei Cossignani, 2018

Species of gastropod

Conus vezzarochristophei is a species of sea snail, a marine gastropod mollusk, in the family Conidae, the cone snails and their allies.

== Distribution ==
This species occurs in Madagascar.
