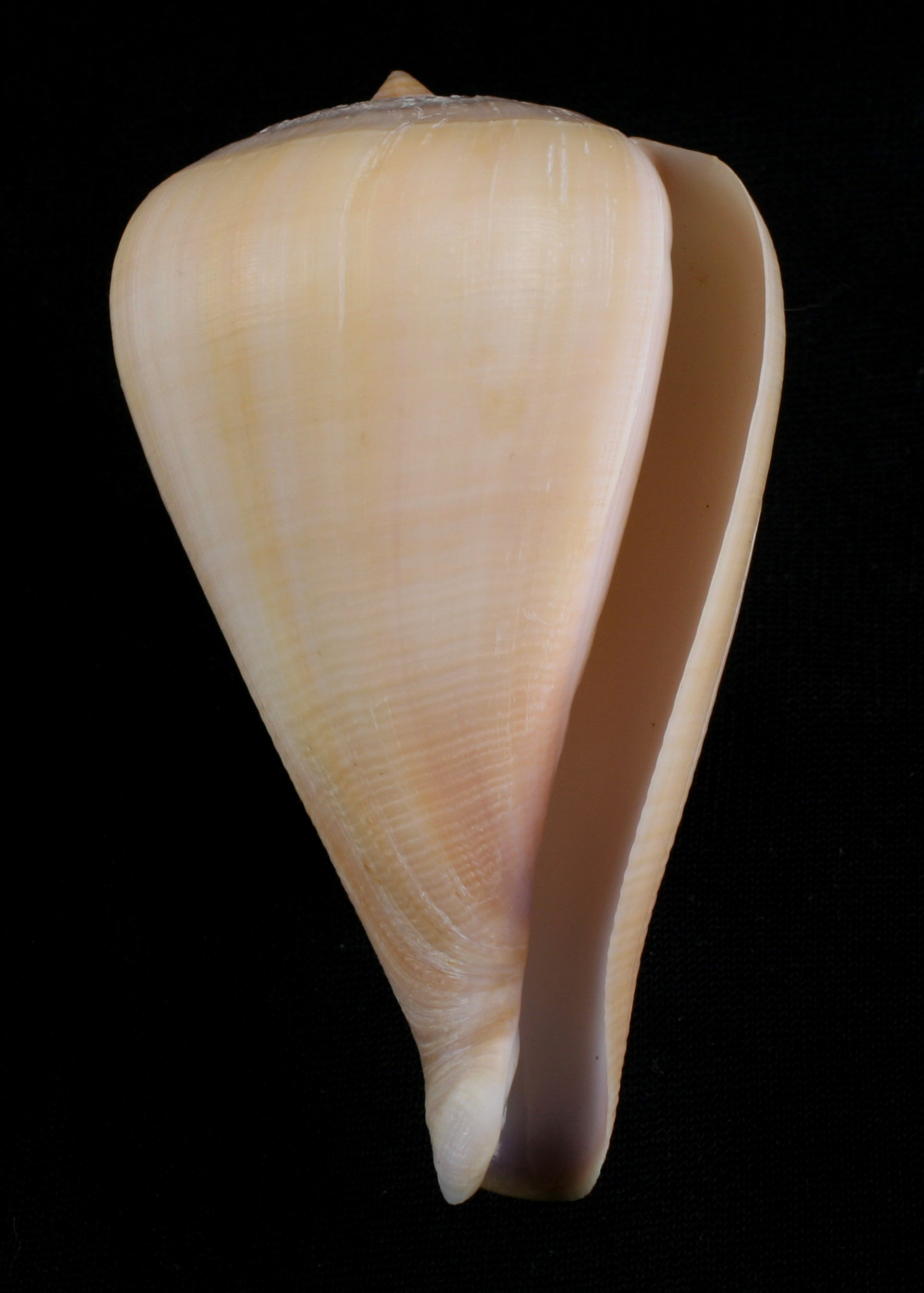
- Apertural view of shell of Conus patricius (Hinds, 1843)

Scientific classification
- Kingdom: Animalia
- Phylum: Mollusca
- Class: Gastropoda
- Subclass: Caenogastropoda
- Order: Neogastropoda
- Family: Conidae
- Genus: Conus
- Subgenus: Pyruconus; Olsson, 1967

Type species
- Conus patricius Hinds, 1843

Synonyms
- Pyruconus Olsson, 1967

= Conus (Pyruconus) =

Subgenus of gastropods

Pyruconus is a subgenus of sea snails, marine gastropod molluscs in the genus Conus, family Conidae, the cone snails and their allies.

In the latest classification of the family Conidae by Puillandre N., Duda T.F., Meyer C., Olivera B.M. & Bouchet P. (2015), Pyruconus has become a subgenus of Conus as Conus (Pyruconus) Olsson, 1967 (type species: Conus patricius Hinds, 1843) represented as Conus Linnaeus, 1758

== Species ==
- Pyruconus fergusoni (G.B. Sowerby II, 1873) represented as Conus fergusoni G. B. Sowerby II, 1873 (alternate representation)
- Pyruconus patricius (Hinds, 1843) represented as Conus patricius Hinds, 1843 (alternate representation)
