= Conus paranobilis =

Conus paranobilis Temporal range: Pliocene-Pleistocene

Conservation status
- Extinct (IUCN 3.1)

Scientific classification
- Kingdom: Animalia
- Phylum: Mollusca
- Class: Gastropoda
- Subclass: Caenogastropoda
- Order: Neogastropoda
- Superfamily: Conoidea
- Family: Conidae
- Genus: Conus
- Species: †C. paranobilis

Binomial name
- †Conus paranobilis Petuch, 1991

Species of sea snail

Conus paranobilis is an extinct species of sea snail, a marine gastropod mollusk in the family Conidae, the cone snails, cone shells or cones.

It is the type species of the extinct family Herndliconus Petuch & Drolshagen, 2015

== Distribution ==
This marine species is only known as a fossil from the Okeechobean Sea (Pliocene, Pleistocene).
