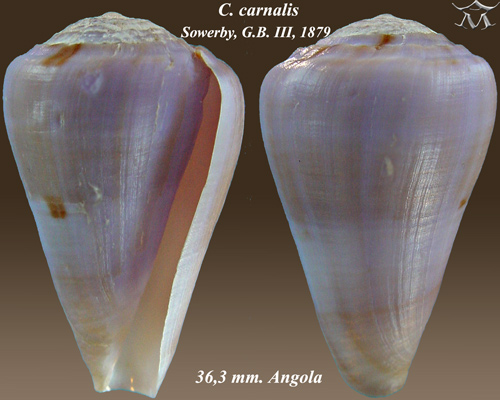
- Apertural and abapertural views of shell of Conus carnalis (Sowerby, G.B. III, 1879)

Scientific classification
- Kingdom: Animalia
- Phylum: Mollusca
- Class: Gastropoda
- Subclass: Caenogastropoda
- Order: Neogastropoda
- Family: Conidae
- Genus: Conus
- Subgenus: Pseudonoduloconus; Tucker & Tenorio, 2009

Type species
- Conus carnalis G. B. Sowerby III, 1879

Synonyms
- Pseudonoduloconus Tucker & Tenorio, 2009

= Conus (Pseudonoduloconus) =

Subgenus of gastropods

Pseudonoduloconus is a subgenus of sea snails, marine gastropod molluscs in the genus Conus, family Conidae, the cone snails and their allies.

In the latest classification of the family Conidae by Puillandre N., Duda T.F., Meyer C., Olivera B.M. & Bouchet P. (2015), Pseudonoduloconus has become a subgenus of Conus as Conus (Pseudonoduloconus)Tucker & Tenorio, 2009 (type species: Conus carnalis G. B. Sowerby III, 1879) represented as Conus Linnaeus, 1758

== Species ==
- Pseudonoduloconus carnalis (G. B. Sowerby III, 1879) represented as Conus carnalis G. B. Sowerby III, 1879 (alternate representation)
