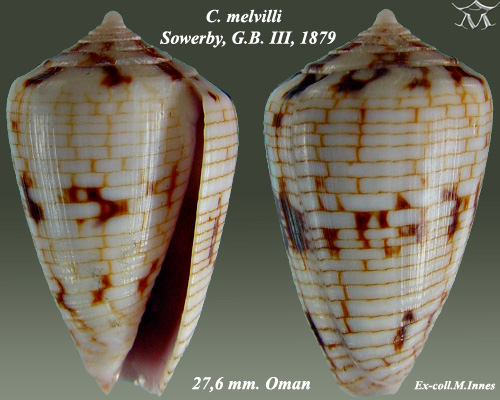
- Apertural and abapertural views of shell of Conus melvilli (Sowerby, G.B. III, 1879)

Scientific classification
- Kingdom: Animalia
- Phylum: Mollusca
- Class: Gastropoda
- Subclass: Caenogastropoda
- Order: Neogastropoda
- Family: Conidae
- Genus: Conus
- Subgenus: Quasiconus; Tucker & Tenorio, 2009

Type species
- Conus melvilli G. B. Sowerby III, 1879

Synonyms
- Quasiconus Tucker & Tenorio, 2009

= Conus (Quasiconus) =

Subgenus of gastropods

Quasiconus is a subgenus of sea snails, marine gastropod molluscs in the genus Conus, family Conidae, the cone snails and their allies.

In the latest classification of the family Conidae by Puillandre N., Duda T.F., Meyer C., Olivera B.M. & Bouchet P. (2015), Quasiconus has become a subgenus of Conus as Conus (Quasiconus)Tucker & Tenorio, 2009 (type species:Conus melvilli G. B. Sowerby III, 1879 ) represented as Conus Linnaeus, 1758

== Species ==
- Quasiconus melvilli (G.B. Sowerby III, 1879) represented as Conus melvilli G. B. Sowerby III, 1879 (alternate representation)
- Quasiconus tuticorinensis (Röckel & Korn, 1990) represented as Conus tuticorinensis Röckel & Korn, 1990 (alternate representation)
