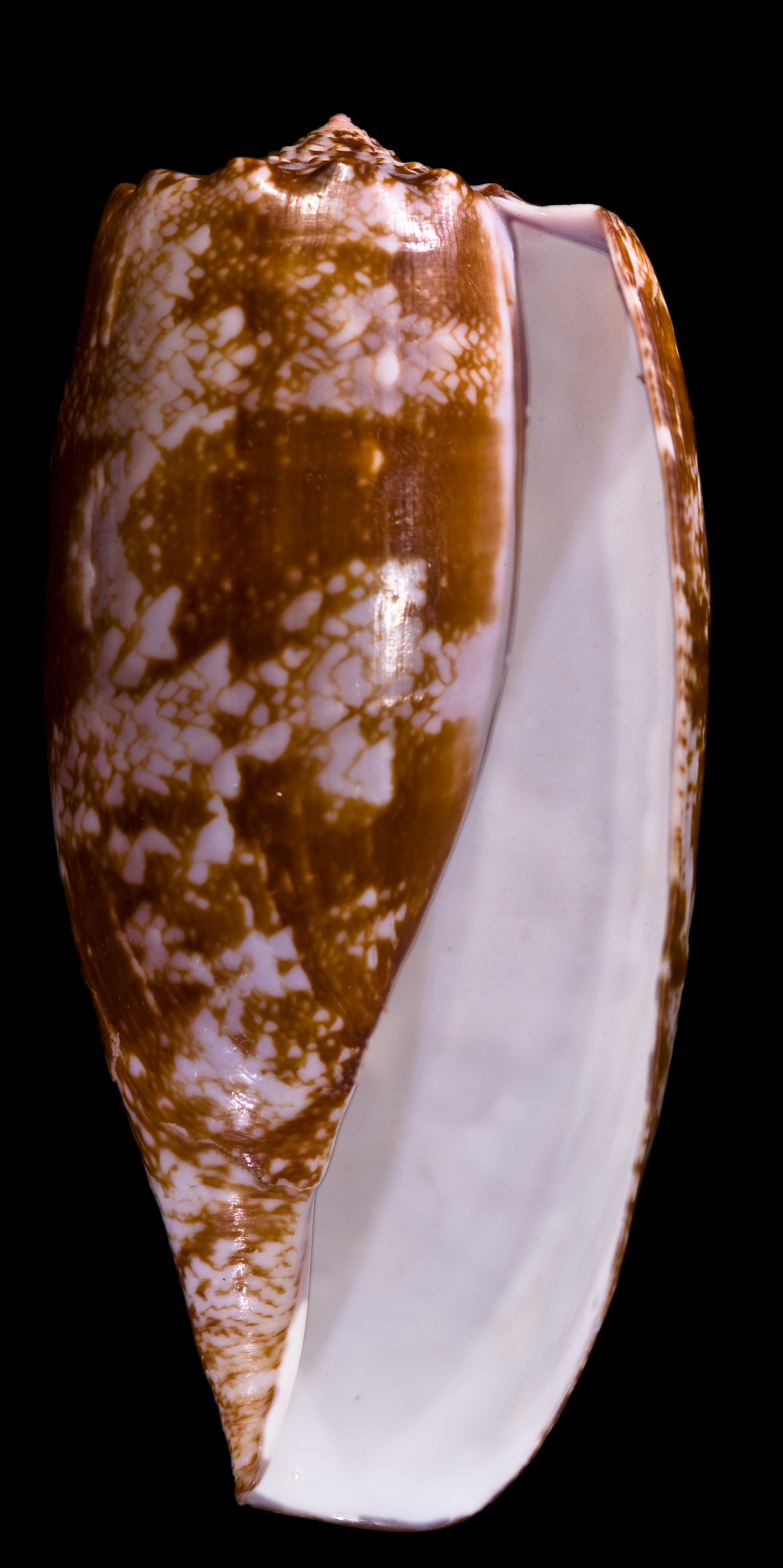
- Apertural view of a shell of Conus geographus (Linnaeus, 1758)

Scientific classification
- Kingdom: Animalia
- Phylum: Mollusca
- Class: Gastropoda
- Subclass: Caenogastropoda
- Order: Neogastropoda
- Family: Conidae
- Genus: Conus
- Subgenus: Gastridium; Modeer, 1793

Type species
- Conus geographus Linnaeus, 1758

Synonyms
- Coronaxis (Tuliparia) Swainson, 1840; Gastridium Modeer, 1793; Protostrioconus Tucker & Tenorio, 2009; Rollus Montfort, 1810; Utriculus Schumacher, 1817

= Conus (Gastridium) =

Subgenus of gastropods

Gastridium is a subgenus of sea snails, marine gastropod molluscs in the genus Conus, family Conidae, the cone snails and their allies.

In the latest classification of the family Conidae by Puillandre N., Duda T.F., Meyer C., Olivera B.M. & Bouchet P. (2015), Gastridium has become a subgenus of Conus as Conus (Gastridium) represented as Conus Linnaeus, 1758.

== Distinguishing characteristics ==
The Tucker & Tenorio 2009 taxonomy distinguishes Gastridium from Conus in the following ways:

- Genus Conus sensu stricto Linnaeus, 1758

Shell characters (living and fossil species)

The basic shell shape is conical to elongated conical, has a deep anal notch on the shoulder, a smooth periostracum and a small operculum. The shoulder of the shell is usually nodulose and the protoconch is usually multispiral. Markings often include the presence of tents except for black or white color variants, with the absence of spiral lines of minute tents and textile bars.

Radular tooth (not known for fossil species)

The radula has an elongated anterior section with serrations and a large exposed terminating cusp, a non-obvious waist, blade is either small or absent and has a short barb, and lacks a basal spur.

Geographical distribution

These species are found in the Indo-Pacific region.

Feeding habits

These species eat other gastropods including cones.

- Subgenus Gastridium Modeer, 1793

Shell characters (living and fossil species)

The shell is cylindrical to ovately cylindrical in shape. The protoconch is multispiral. The shell has bulging body whorl creating a very wide aperture . The anal notch is shallow. The shell is ornamented with tents, as well as spiral lines of minute tents. Textile bars are absent. The periostracum is tufted or ridged, and the operculum is small.

Radular tooth (not known for fossil species)

The anterior section of the radular tooth is greatly elongated compared to the posterior section. The waist is not obvious. The basal spur is absent, and the barb and blade are short. Serrations are present. The radular morphology of this genus is unique as it has no terminating cusp or accessory process.

Geographical distribution

These species are found in the Indo-Pacific region.

Feeding habits

These species are piscivorous, meaning that these cone snails prey on fish.

== Species list ==
This list of species is based on the information in the World Register of Marine Species (WoRMS) list. Species within the genus Gastridium include:

- Gastridium cuvieri (Crosse, 1858) synonym of Conus cuvieri Crosse, 1858
- Gastridium eldredi (Morrison, 1955) synonym of Conus eldredi Morrison, 1955
- Gastridium fragilissimum (Petuch, 1979) synonym of Conus fragilissimus Petuch, 1979
- Gastridium geographus (Linnaeus, 1758) synonym of Conus geographus Linnaeus, 1758
- Gastridium tulipa (Linnaeus, 1758) synonym of Conus tulipa Linnaeus, 1758
