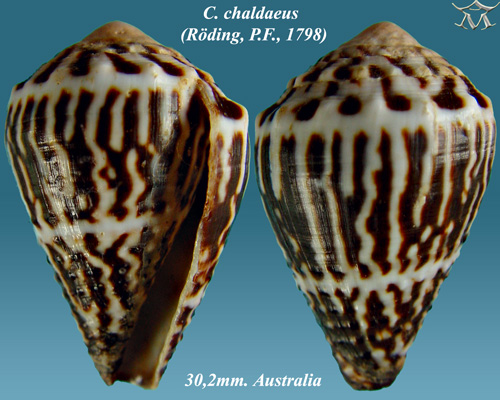
- Apertural and abapertural views of shell of Conus chaldaeus (Röding, 1798)

Scientific classification
- Kingdom: Animalia
- Phylum: Mollusca
- Class: Gastropoda
- Subclass: Caenogastropoda
- Order: Neogastropoda
- Family: Conidae
- Genus: Conus
- Subgenus: Virroconus; Iredale, 1930

Type species
- Conus ebraeus Linnaeus, 1758<

Synonyms
- Dyraspis Iredale, 1949; Miliariconus J. K. Tucker & M. Tenorio, 2009; Virroconus Iredale, 1930

= Conus (Virroconus) =

Subgenus of molluscs

Virroconus is a subgenus of sea snails, marine gastropod molluscs in the genus Conus, family Conidae, the cone snails and their allies.

In the latest classification of the family Conidae by Puillandre N., Duda T.F., Meyer C., Olivera B.M. & Bouchet P. (2015), Virroconus has become a subgenus of Conus as Conus (Virroconus) Iredale, 1930 (type species: Conus ebraeus Linnaeus, 1758): synonym of Conus Linnaeus, 1758

== Species ==
- Virroconus chaldaeus (Röding, 1798): synonym of Conus chaldaeus (Röding, 1798)
- Virroconus ebraeus (Linnaeus, 1758): synonym of Conus ebraeus Linnaeus, 1758
- Virroconus judaeus (Bergh, 1895): synonym of Conus judaeus Bergh, 1895
