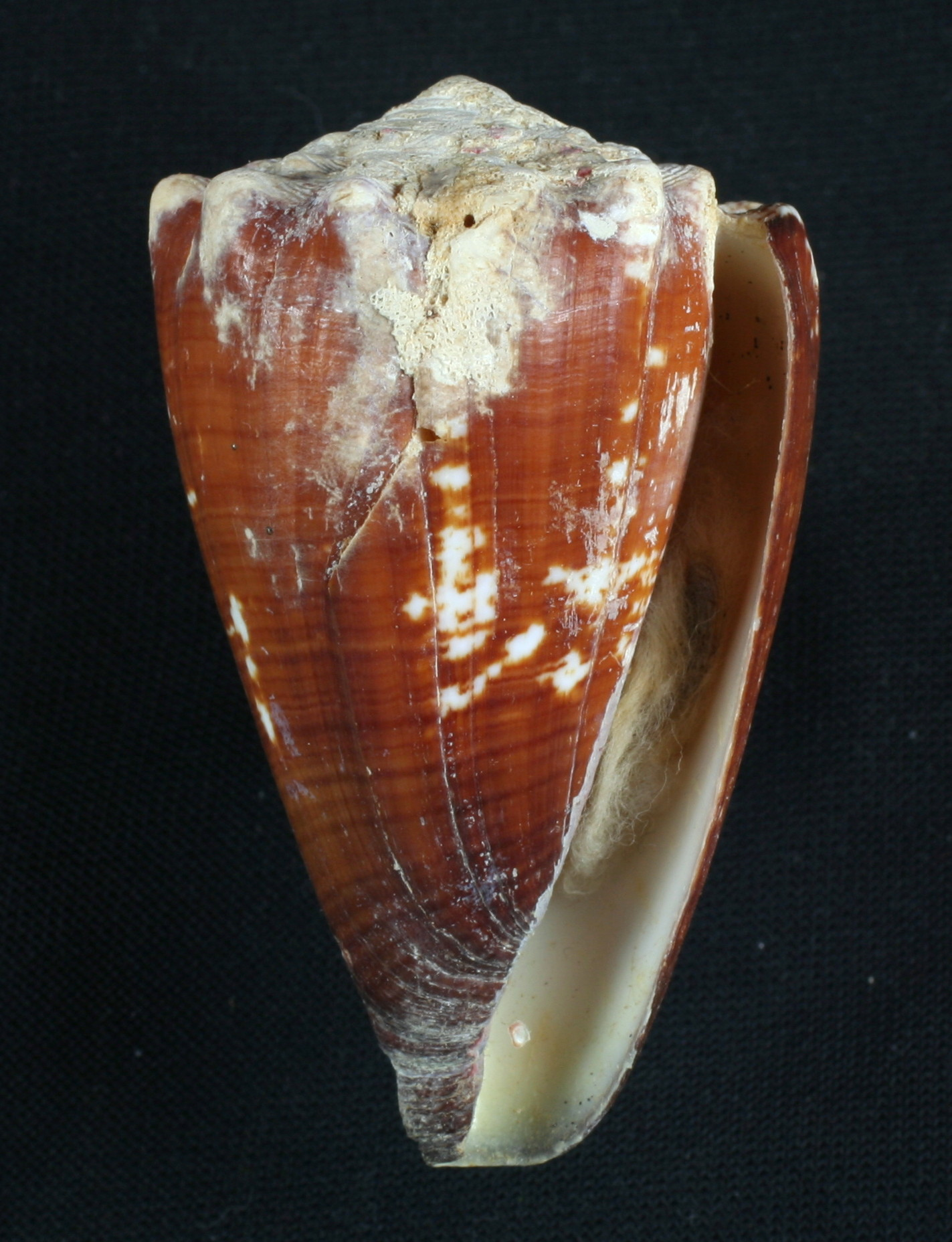
- Apertural view of shell of Conus brunneus (Wood, 1828), with operculum, measuring 61.7 mm in height, collected at Sayrilita, Mexico

Scientific classification
- Kingdom: Animalia
- Phylum: Mollusca
- Class: Gastropoda
- Subclass: Caenogastropoda
- Order: Neogastropoda
- Family: Conidae
- Genus: Conus
- Subgenus: Stephanoconus; Mörch, 1852

Type species
- Conus leucostictus Gmelin, 1791

Synonyms
- Cornutoconus M. Suzuki, 1972; Leptoconus (Protoconus) da Motta, 1991; Protoconus da Motta, 1991; Rhombiconus J. K. Tucker & M. Tenorio, 2009; Rhombus Montfort, 1810; Seminoleconus Petuch, 2003; Stephanoconus Mörch, 1852; Tenorioconus Petuch & Drolshagen, 2011

= Conus (Stephanoconus) =

Subgenus of gastropods

Stephanoconus is a subgenus of sea snails, marine gastropod molluscs in the genus Conus, family Conidae, the cone snails and their allies.

In the latest classification of the family Conidae by Puillandre N., Duda T.F., Meyer C., Olivera B.M. & Bouchet P. (2015), Stephanoconus has become a subgenus of Conus as Conus (Stephanoconus)Mörch, 1852 (type species: Conus leucostictus Gmelin, 1791) represented as Conus Linnaeus, 1758

== Species ==
- Stephanoconus bartschi (Hanna & Strong, 1949) represented as Conus bartschi G. D. Hanna & Strong, 1949 (alternate representation)
- Stephanoconus brunneus (W. Wood, 1828) represented as Conus brunneus Wood, 1828 (alternate representation)
- Stephanoconus regius (Gmelin, 1791) represented as Conus regius Gmelin, 1791 (alternate representation)
