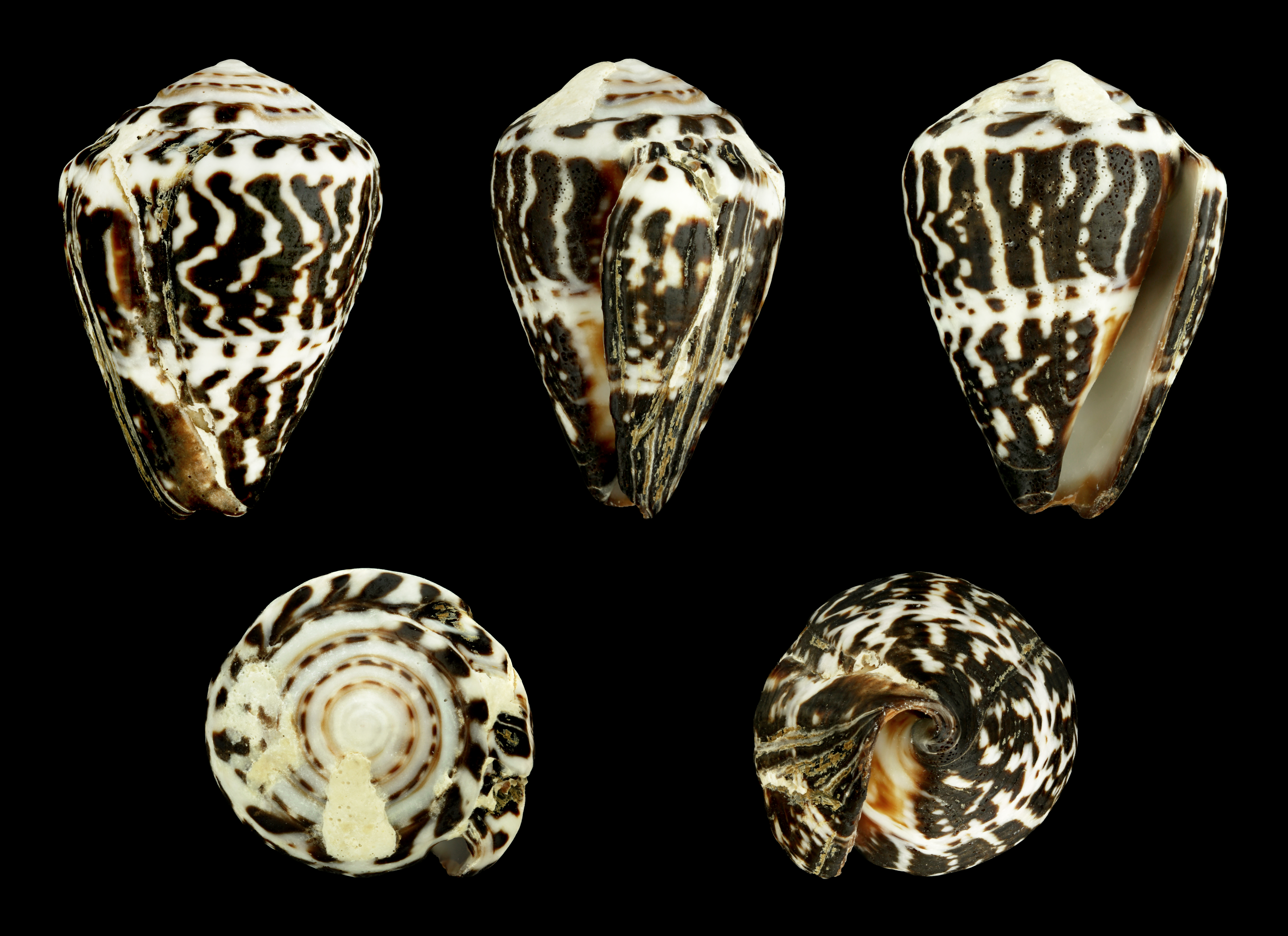
- Five views of a shell of Conus chaldaeus (Röding, P.F., 1798)

Conservation status
- Least Concern (IUCN 3.1)

Scientific classification
- Kingdom: Animalia
- Phylum: Mollusca
- Class: Gastropoda
- Subclass: Caenogastropoda
- Order: Neogastropoda
- Superfamily: Conoidea
- Family: Conidae
- Genus: Conus
- Species: C. chaldaeus

Binomial name
- Conus chaldaeus (Röding, 1798)

Synonyms
- Conus (Virroconus) chaldaeus (Röding, 1798) accepted, alternate representation; Conus brunneus var. pemphigus Dall, 1910; Conus vermiculatus Lamarck, 1810; Cucullus chaldaeus Röding, 1798; Virroconus chaldaeus (Röding, 1798)

= Conus chaldaeus =

Species of sea snail

Conus chaldaeus, common name the Chaldean cone, is a species of sea snail, a marine gastropod mollusk in the family Conidae, the cone snails and their allies.

Like all species within the genus Conus, these snails are predatory and venomous. They are capable of stinging humans, therefore live ones should be handled carefully or not at all.

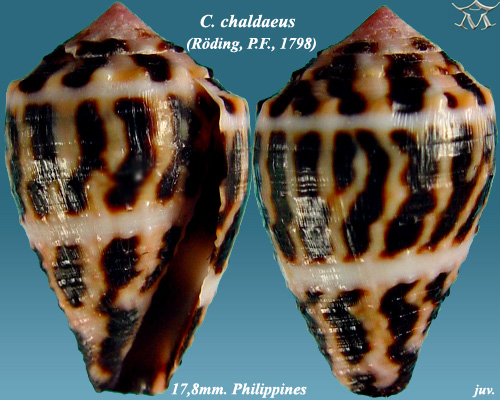
Conus chaldaeus (Röding, P.F., 1798)

== Description ==
The size of the shell varies between 19.7 mm and 59 mm. The color of the shell is white, sometimes rose-tinted, with three or four revolving bands composed of irregular longitudinal dark chocolate or nearly black markings. The black markings are more continuous, so as usually to cover the length of the shell except an irregular white central band. Sometimes those markings are impressed so that the intervening white spaces project granularly or tuberculately above the surface; occasionally also the entire surface becomes dark chocolate with the exception of the white band, and a white spot here and there. These markings also ornament the slightly coronated spire. The aperture is white with clouded bands corresponding with the exterior markings. The surface of the shell is more or less striate throughout, but the striae become more prominent towards the dark stained base.

== Distribution ==
This marine species occurs in the Red Sea, in the tropical Indo-Pacific and in the Eastern Pacific (El Salvador, Guatemala, Honduras, Mexico, Nicaragua, Panama); off New Zealand and Australia (New South Wales, the Northern Territory, Queensland, Western Australia).
