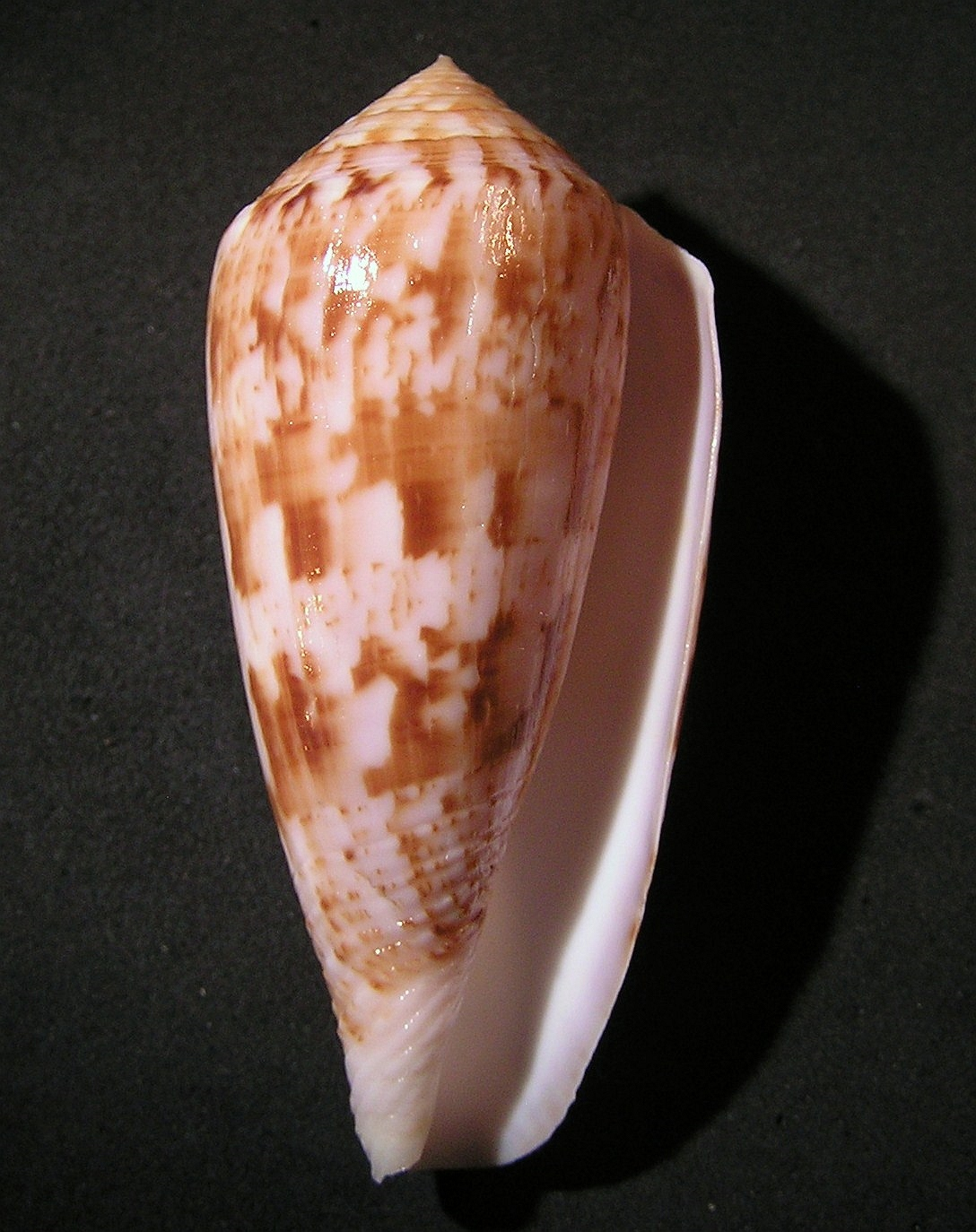
- Apertural view of Conus kinoshitai

Scientific classification
- Kingdom: Animalia
- Phylum: Mollusca
- Class: Gastropoda
- Subclass: Caenogastropoda
- Order: Neogastropoda
- Superfamily: Conoidea
- Family: Conidae
- Genus: Conus
- Species: C. kinoshitai

Binomial name
- Conus kinoshitai (Kuroda, 1956)

Synonyms
- Afonsoconus kinoshitai (Kuroda, 1956) ·; Asprella kinoshitai (Kuroda, 1956); Conus (Afonsoconus) kinoshitai (Kuroda, 1956) accepted, alternate representation; Chelyconus kinoshitai Kuroda, 1956 (original combination); Conus brontodes Shikama, 1979; Conus (Strioconus) brontodes Shikama, T., 1979; Conus kinoshitai f. calliginosus Shikama, 1979 (unavailable name: established as a form after 1960); Conus kinoshitai f. tamikoana Shikama, 1979 (unjustified emendation of Conus tamikoae Shikama, 1973); Conus (Embrikena) kinoshitai "calliginosus" Shikama, T., 1979; Conus tamikoae Shikama, 1973

= Conus kinoshitai =

Species of sea snail

Conus kinoshitai, common name Kinoshita's cone, is a species of sea snail, a marine gastropod mollusk in the family Conidae, the cone snails and their allies.

These snails are predatory and venomous. They are capable of stinging humans, therefore live ones should be handled carefully or not at all.

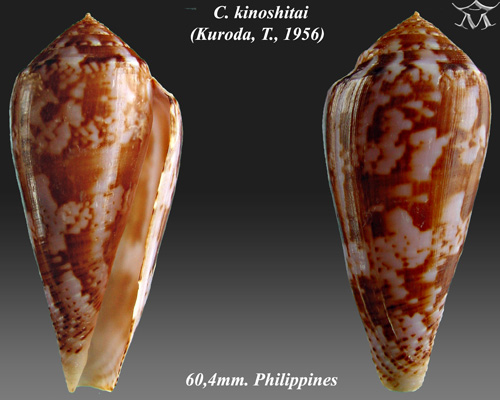
Conus kinoshitai (Kuroda, T., 1956)

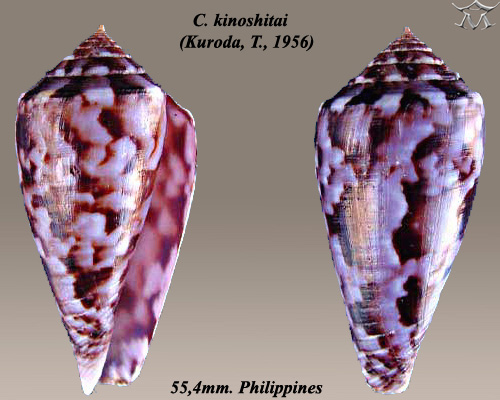
Conus kinoshitai (Kuroda, T., 1956)

== Description ==
The size of an adult shell varies between 40 mm and 100 mm.

== Distribution ==
This species occurs in the South China Sea and in the Pacific Ocean from the Philippines to the Solomons. There are also records in the Indian Ocean from Mozambique, Madagascar, and Réunion.
