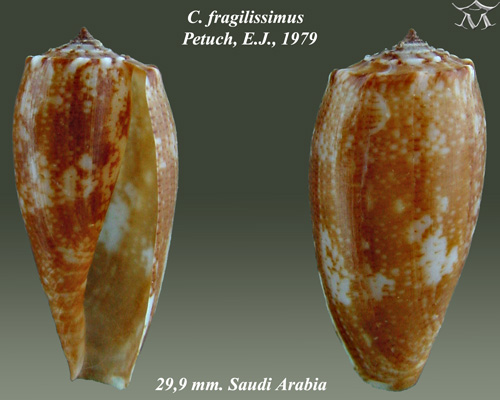
- Apertural and abapertural views of shell of Conus fragilissimus Petuch, E.J., 1979

Conservation status
- Data Deficient (IUCN 3.1)

Scientific classification
- Kingdom: Animalia
- Phylum: Mollusca
- Class: Gastropoda
- Subclass: Caenogastropoda
- Order: Neogastropoda
- Superfamily: Conoidea
- Family: Conidae
- Genus: Conus
- Species: C. fragilissimus

Binomial name
- Conus fragilissimus Petuch, 1979

Synonyms
- Conus (Gastridium) fragilissimus Petuch, 1979 · accepted, alternate representation; Gastridium fragilissimum (Petuch, 1979)

= Conus fragilissimus =

Species of sea snail

Conus fragilissimus, common name the fragile geography cone, is a species of sea snail, a marine gastropod mollusk in the family Conidae, the cone snails and their allies.

Like all species within the genus Conus, these snails are predatory and venomous. They are capable of stinging humans, therefore live ones should be handled carefully or not at all.

== Description ==
Original description: "Shell extremely thin, fragile, translucent, glossy; outline ovately cylindrical; sides convex, tapering to the anterior end; shoulder wide, angled, with prominent coronations; spire high, stepped, somewhat scalariform; spire sculpture consisting of 4-6 fine revolving spiral threads; aperture wide, flaring; color pale tan with longitudinal brown flammules, flammules often coalescing into large brown patches; base color pattern overlaid with variable amounts of dots, dashes, and netlike pattern; spire color pale tan with regularly spaced dark brown flammules; protoconch and early whorls dark brown; shoulder coronations white; aperture white; periostracum smooth, translucent yellow; operculum unknown."

The size of the shell varies between 26 mm and 50 mm.

== Distribution ==
Locus typicus: "3 metres depth, off South coast of Harmil Isl., Dahlak Archipelago, Eritrea Province, Ethiopia."

This species occurs in the Red Sea and off Ethiopia.

== Etymology ==
"In reference to the almost paper thinness of the shell."
