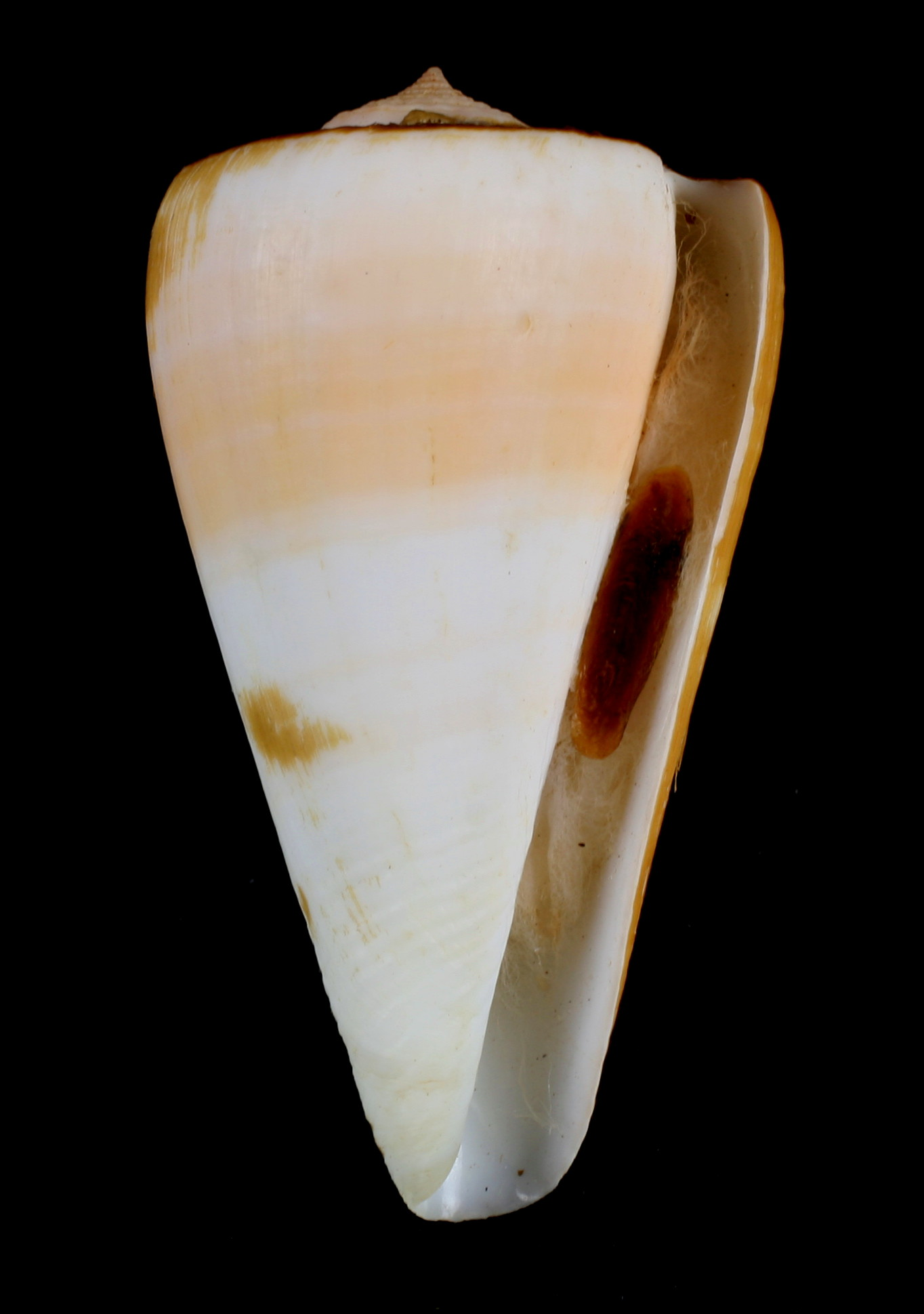
- Apertural view of shell of Conus fergusoni G.B.Sowerby III, 1873, with operculum, measuring 65.3 mm in height, collected at low tide at Venudo Island, in Panama.

Conservation status
- Least Concern (IUCN 3.1)

Scientific classification
- Kingdom: Animalia
- Phylum: Mollusca
- Class: Gastropoda
- Subclass: Caenogastropoda
- Order: Neogastropoda
- Superfamily: Conoidea
- Family: Conidae
- Genus: Conus
- Species: C. fergusoni

Binomial name
- Conus fergusoni G. B. Sowerby II, 1873

Synonyms
- Conus (Pyruconus) fergusoni G. B. Sowerby II, 1873 · accepted, alternate representation; Conus consanguineus E. A. Smith, 1880; Conus fulvocinctus Crosse, 1872 (ruled by ICZN Opinion 1502 not to have precedence over C. fergusoni); Pyruconus fergusoni G. B. Sowerby II, 1873

= Conus fergusoni =

Species of sea snail

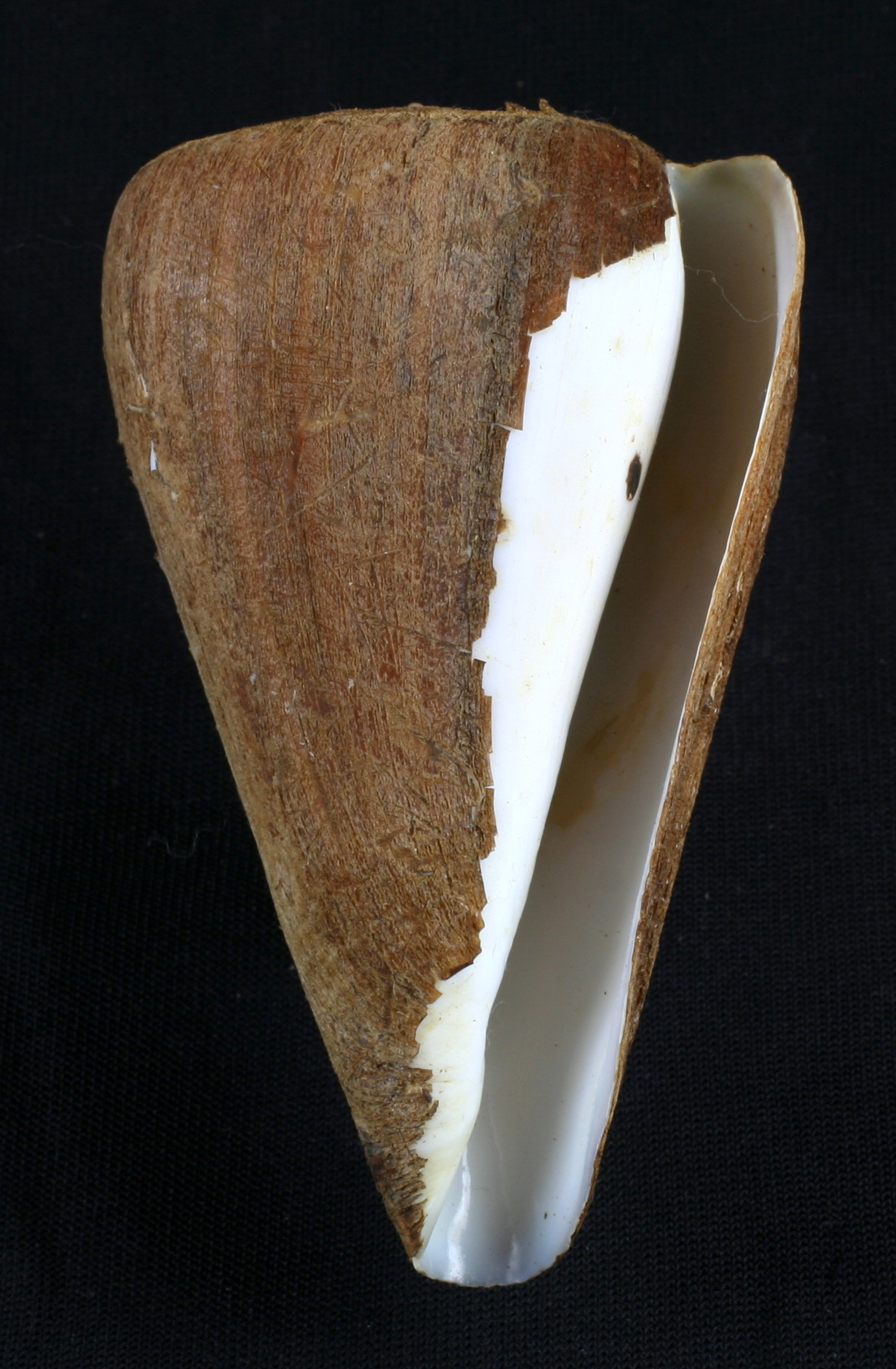
Specimen of Conus fergusoni with periostracum still intact.

Conus fergusoni, common name the Ferguson's cone, is a species of sea snail, a marine gastropod mollusk in the family Conidae, the cone snails and their allies.

Like all species within the genus Conus, these snails are predatory and venomous. They are capable of stinging humans, therefore live ones should be handled carefully or not at all.

== Description ==
The size of an adult shell varies between 60 mm and 150 mm. The heavy shell has a slightly channeled spire. The white shell is lightly striolate transversely and is covered under a brown epidermis.

== Distribution ==
This species occurs in the Pacific Ocean off the Galapagos Islands and from the Gulf of California to Peru.

== Gallery ==
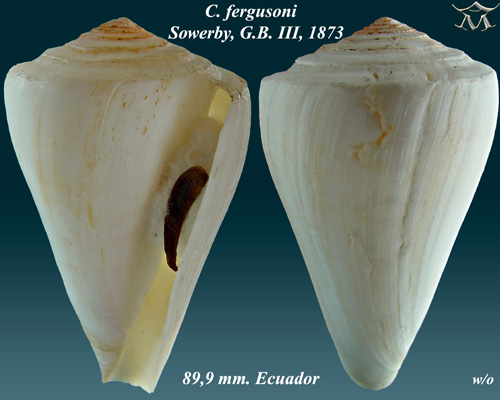
Conus fergusoni Sowerby, G.B. II, 1873

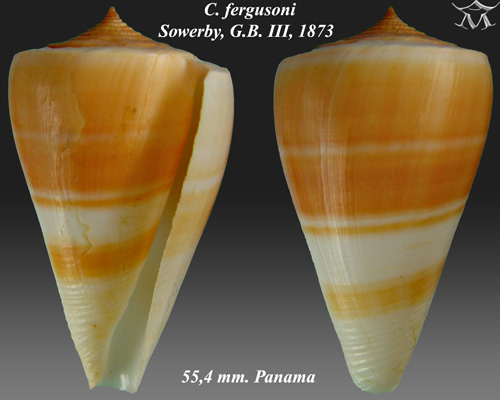
Conus fergusoni Sowerby, G.B. II, 1873
