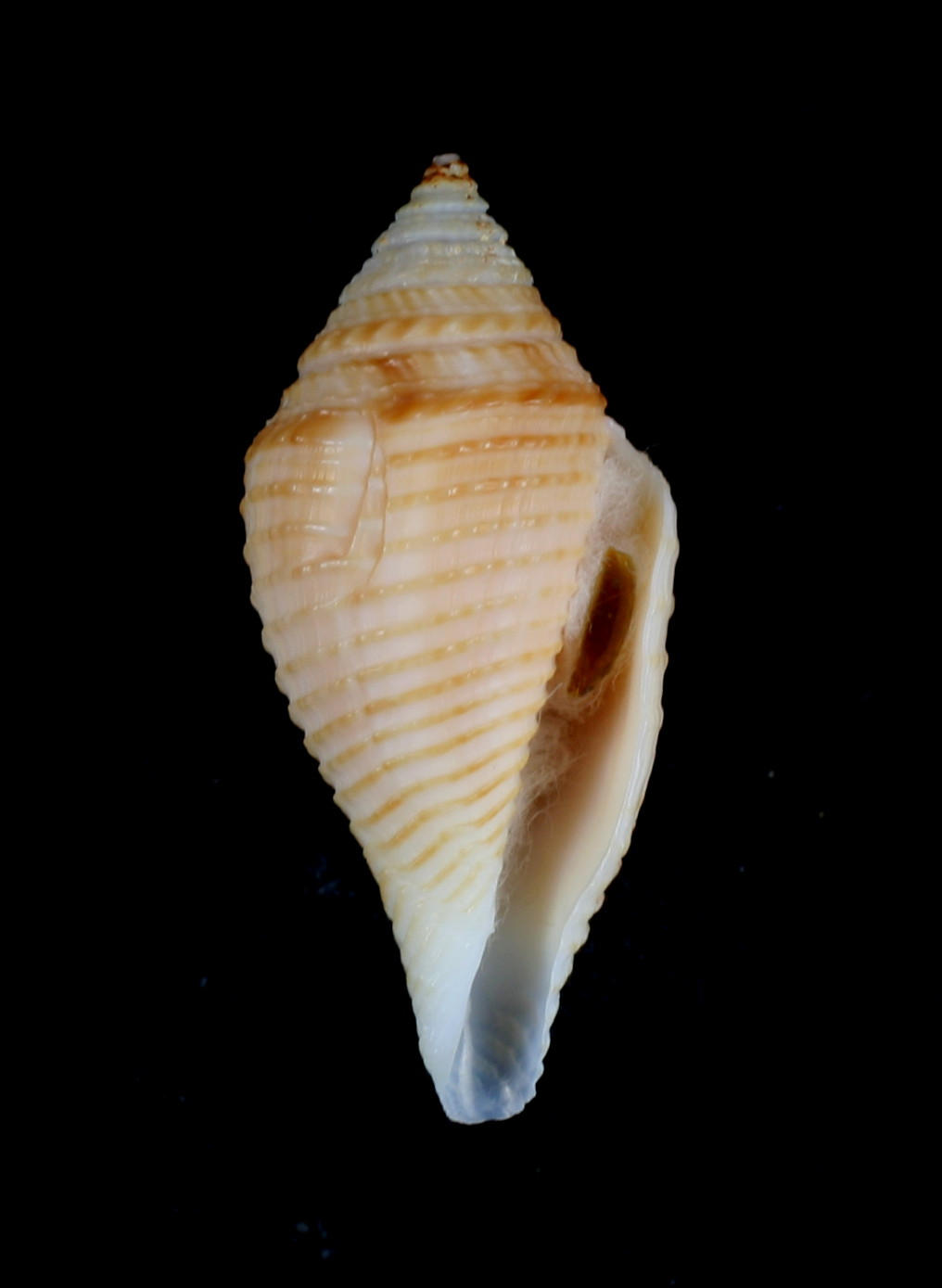
- Apertural view of shell of Conasprella coromandelica (E.A. Smith, 1894) with operculum, measuring 35.4 mm in height, dredged at 250 feet off Madras, in India.

Scientific classification
- Kingdom: Animalia
- Phylum: Mollusca
- Class: Gastropoda
- Subclass: Caenogastropoda
- Order: Neogastropoda
- Family: Conidae
- Genus: Pseudoconorbis; Tucker & Tenorio, 2009

Type species
- Conorbis coromandelicus (E.A. Smith, 1894)

= Pseudoconorbis =

Genus of gastropods

Pseudoconorbis is a genus of sea snails, marine gastropod mollusks in the family Conidae, the cone snails and their allies.

This species has become a synonym of Conasprella

== Species ==
Species within the genus Pseudoconorbis include:

- Pseudoconorbis adamii L. Bozzetti, 1994: synonym of Genotina adamii (L. Bozzetti, 1994)
- Pseudoconorbis coromandelicus (E.A. Smith, 1894): synonym of Conasprella coromandelica (E. A. Smith, 1894)
- Pseudoconorbis traceyi Tucker & Stahlschmidt, 2010: synonym of Conasprella traceyi (Tucker & Stahlschmidt, 2010)
