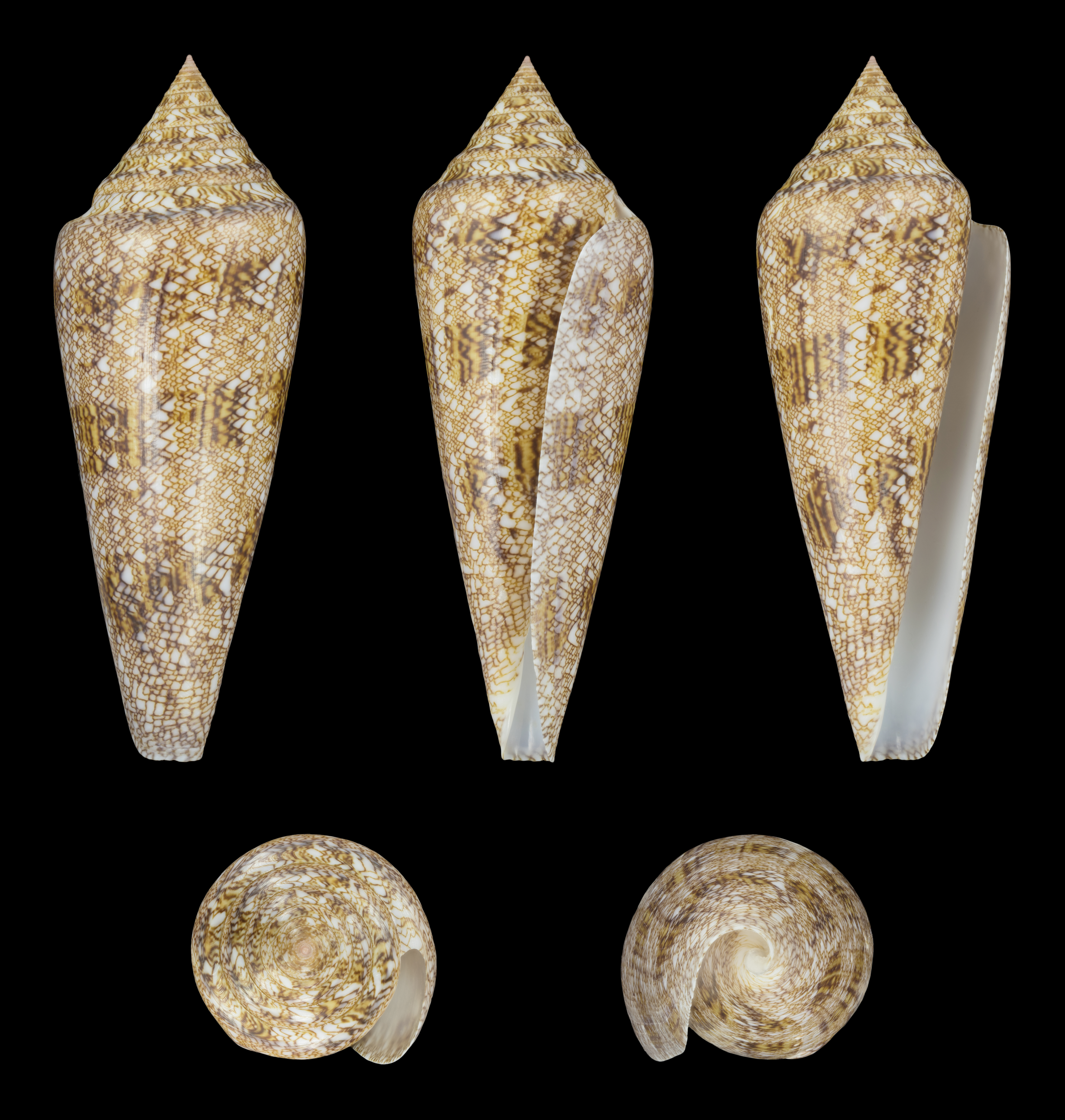
- Conus gloriamaris

Conservation status
- Least Concern (IUCN 3.1)

Scientific classification
- Kingdom: Animalia
- Phylum: Mollusca
- Class: Gastropoda
- Subclass: Caenogastropoda
- Order: Neogastropoda
- Superfamily: Conoidea
- Family: Conidae
- Genus: Conus
- Species: C. gloriamaris

Binomial name
- Conus gloriamaris (Chemnitz, 1777)

Synonyms
- Conus (Cylinder) gloriamaris Chemnitz, 1777 · accepted, alternate representation; Conus gloria Bosc, 1801; Conus gloriamaris Hwass, C.H. in Bruguière, J.G., 1792; Cylinder gloriamaris (Chemnitz, 1777); Cylindrus gloriamaris (Chemnitz, 1777)

= Conus gloriamaris =

Species of sea snail

Conus gloriamaris, common name the Glory of the Sea Cone, is a species of sea snail, a marine gastropod mollusk in the family Conidae, the cone snails, cone shells or cones. It is commonly found in the Pacific and Indian Oceans.

== Description ==
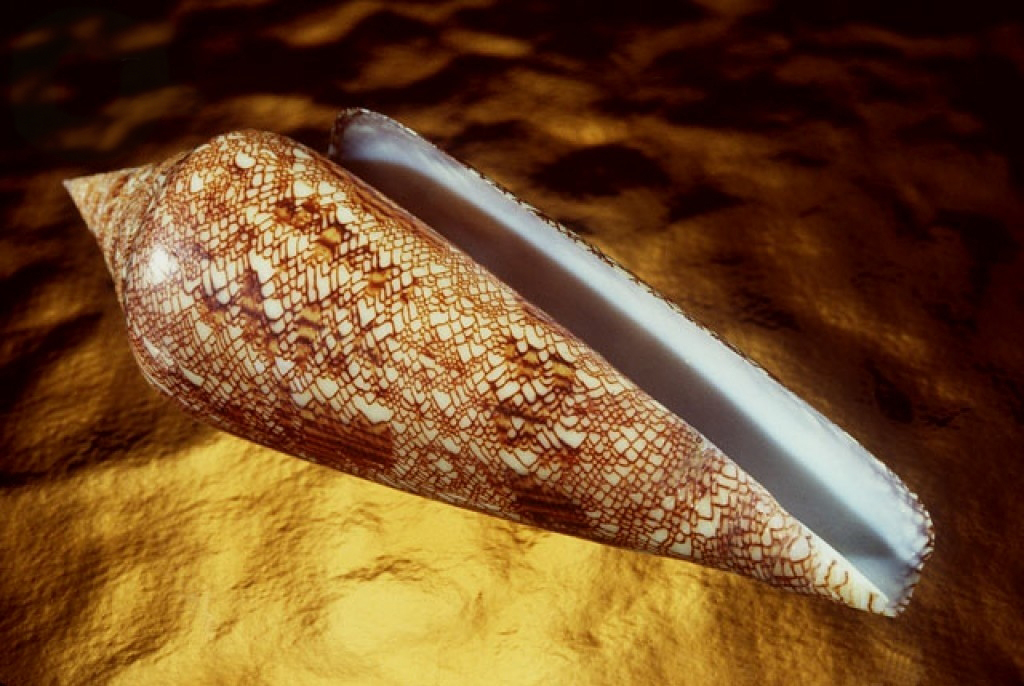
1777 specimen from the Smithsonian Institution

The shell can reach 16 centimetres (6.3 in) in length, but typically measures between 8 and 12 centimetres (3.1 and 4.7 in). Compared with other cones, C. gloriamaris is relatively large, slender, featuring a tall spire. It is finely reticulated with orange-brown lines, enclosing triangular spaces similar to those of other textile cones, and two or three bands of chestnut hieroglyphic markings across its body. It is sometimes confused with the common Textile cone, and there is a similarity to the Bengal cone. The tan coloration can vary from a lighter, golden color to a deeper dark brown, with intricate detailing.

== Collector value ==
The shell of this mollusc species has special significance to shell collectors because it was once regarded as the rarest shell in the world. For about two centuries between its initial discovery and the discovery of its habitat in 1969, specimens were valued in the thousands of U.S. dollars and generally only owned by museums and wealthy private collectors. Furthermore, the shell's popularity among collectors spawned urban legends, most notably the story of a collector purchasing one at auction in 1792 only to destroy it, to maintain the value of another one already in his collection. Improvements in diving technology such as the advent of scuba led to their discovery in larger numbers, and today shells can often be found from retailers or online auction sites for less than $100 U.S. Nonetheless, the legacy of this shell in addition to its pleasing shape and patterns makes it popular and desirable among shell collectors today.

== Distribution ==
This is one of the many Indo-Pacific species of cone snail. It is found principally off the Solomon Islands but with a habitat ranging from the Philippines and eastern Indonesia, through New Guinea, and as far east as Samoa and Fiji.

== Gallery ==
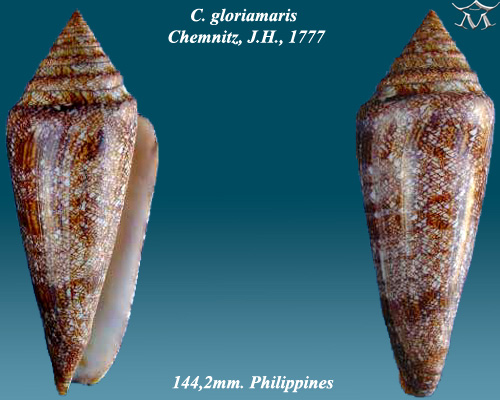
Conus gloriamaris Chemnitz, J.H., 1777

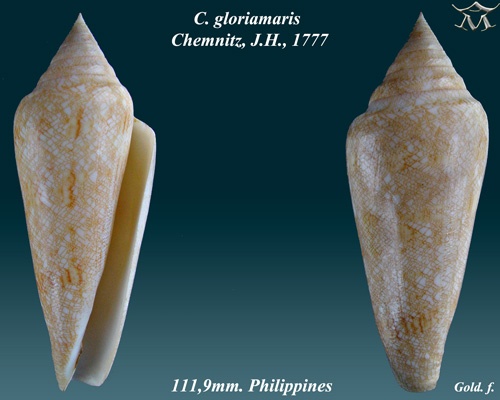
Conus gloriamaris Chemnitz, J.H., 1777

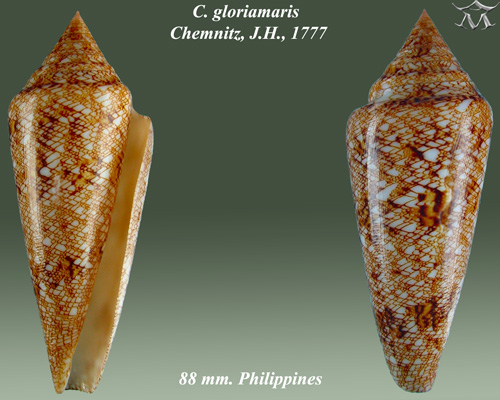
Conus gloriamaris Chemnitz, J.H., 1777
