= ConoServer =

Content
- Description: conopeptide database.
- Organisms: cone snails

Contact
- Research center: University of Queensland
- Laboratory: Division of Chemistry and Structural Biology, Institute for Molecular Bioscience
- Primary citation: Kaas & al. (2012)
- Release date: 2008

Access
- Website: https://www.conoserver.org

Miscellaneous
- Curation policy: manual/automatic

ConoServer is a database of toxins that are expressed by the predatory sea snails in the family Conidae, the cone snails. These toxins are known as conotoxins or conopeptides. The toxins are of importance to medical research. A notable feature of these peptides is their high specificity and affinity towards human ion channels, receptors and transporters of the nervous system. This makes conopeptides an interesting resource for the physiological studies of neuroreceptors and promising drug leads.

== See also ==
- Conidae
- Conus
