= Kenyonia =

Scientific classification
- Kingdom: Animalia
- Phylum: Mollusca
- Class: Gastropoda
- Subclass: Caenogastropoda
- Order: Neogastropoda
- Family: Conidae
- Genus: Kenyonia; Brazier, 1896

Genus of gastropods

Kenyonia is a genus or subgenus of sea snails, marine gastropod mollusks in the family Conidae, the cone snails and their allies.

In the new classification of the family Conidae by Puillandre N., Duda T.F., Meyer C., Olivera B.M. & Bouchet P. (2015), Kenyonia has become a subgenus of Conus: Conus (Kenyonia) Brazier, 1896 represented as Conus Thiele, 1929

In the same study it is also treated as genus incertae sedis within the family Conidae. In 1966 Powell suggested this was actually a turrid, and thought it to be synonym to Conopleura. A re-evaluation was made by an article in the malacological journal Nautilus by Donn L. Tippetl and John K. Tucker: Taxonomic Notes on Kenyonia Brazier and Conopleura Hinds (Gastropoda: Conoidea) and concluded to it belongs to the Conidae, based on the extensive interior re-modeling of the shell.

== Species ==
Species within the genus Kenyonia include:

- Kenyonia pulcherrima Brazier, 1896. It is also considered an invalid name as a junior homonym of the fossil species Conus pulcherrimus Heilprin, 1879, itself a synonym of Conus excelsus G. B. Sowerby III, 1908 . This marine species was found off the New Hebrides.

(Original description by Brazier) The subcylindrical shell is rather thin, smooth, and sometimes marked with faint slightly curved longitudinal lines of growth. The eight whorls are tabled at the suture, each one being connected with small curious shelly plates that look like small deep pits when the shell is looked at end-on from the apex, giving the edge of the shoulder a coronated appearance, with triangular pointed nodes. The last whorl is more than half the length of the whole shell. It is ornamented with longitudinal reddish brown streaks and blotches, some of a zig-zag pattern. The three upper or apical whorls show a flesh colour and are smooth. The outer lip is sinuous, and has an oblique posterior deep narrow sinus. The columella is straight. The interior of the aperture is white. Length 28 mm, last whorl 17mm, the others 12 mm; diam. maj. 10 mm.
