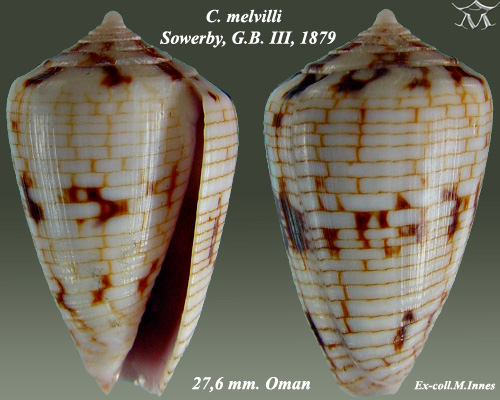
- Apertural and abapertural views of shell of Conus melvilli Sowerby, G.B. III, 1879
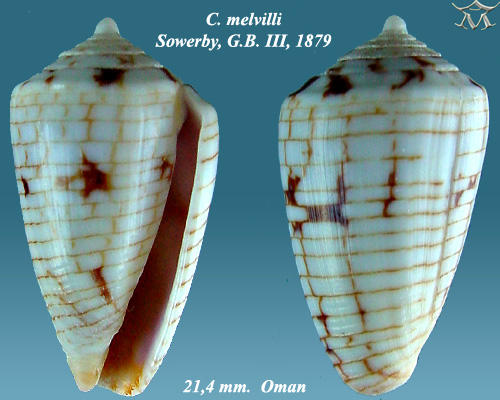

Conservation status
- Vulnerable (IUCN 3.1)

Scientific classification
- Kingdom: Animalia
- Phylum: Mollusca
- Class: Gastropoda
- Subclass: Caenogastropoda
- Order: Neogastropoda
- Superfamily: Conoidea
- Family: Conidae
- Genus: Conus
- Species: C. melvilli

Binomial name
- Conus melvilli G. B. Sowerby III, 1879

Synonyms
- Chelyconus boschi Clover, P.W., 1972; Conus (Quasiconus) melvilli G. B. Sowerby III, 1879 · accepted, alternate representation; Conus boschi Clover, 1972; Conus pusio G. B. Sowerby II, 1834; Quasiconus melvilli (G. B. Sowerby III, 1879)

= Conus melvilli =

Species of sea snail

Conus melvilli, common name Melvill's cone, is a species of sea snail, a marine gastropod mollusk in the family Conidae, the cone snails and their allies.

Like all species within the genus Conus, these snails are predatory and venomous. They are capable of stinging humans, therefore live ones should be handled carefully or not at all.

== Description ==
The size of the shell varies between 18 mm and 32 mm. The solid shell is abbreviately subcylindrical, and obtusely angulated. It is smooth and crenate-sulcate in front. ts color is grayish white, with cinnamon brown longitudinal clouds, and undulating revolving lines. The interstices show some curved longitudinal lines. The obtuse spire is strigate with brown. The aperture is brown-tinted.

== Distribution ==
This marine species occurs off Oman, in the Persian Gulf and perhaps off the Maldives
