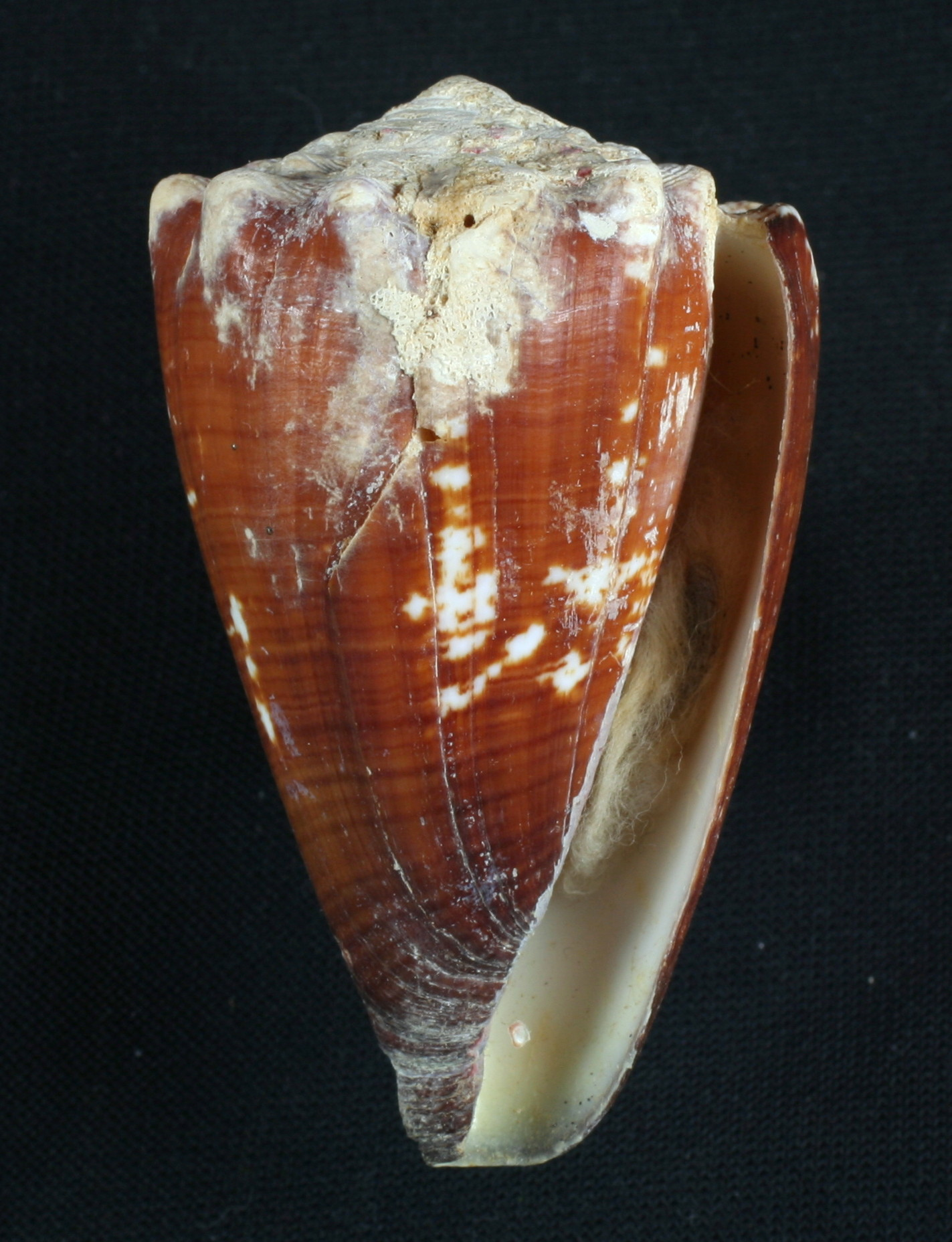
- Apertural view of shell of Conus brunneus Wood, 1828, with operculum, measuring 61.7 mm in height, collected at Sayrilita, Mexico

Conservation status
- Least Concern (IUCN 3.1)

Scientific classification
- Kingdom: Animalia
- Phylum: Mollusca
- Class: Gastropoda
- Subclass: Caenogastropoda
- Order: Neogastropoda
- Superfamily: Conoidea
- Family: Conidae
- Genus: Conus
- Species: C. brunneus

Binomial name
- Conus brunneus Wood, 1828

Synonyms
- Conus (Stephanoconus) brunneus Wood, 1828 accepted, alternate representation; Conus interruptus Wood, 1828; Stephanoconus brunneus (W. Wood, 1828)

= Conus brunneus =

Species of sea snail

Conus brunneus, common name Wood's brown cone, is a species of sea snail, a marine gastropod mollusk in the family Conidae, the cone snails and their allies.

Like all species within the genus Conus, these snails are predatory and venomous. They are capable of stinging humans; therefore, live ones should be handled carefully or not at all.

== Description ==
The size of the shell varies between 16 mm and 65 mm. The short spire is conical and tuberculate. The color of the shell is chestnut-brown, lineated with chocolate, with sometimes longitudinal white maculations forming a broad central interrupted band, and a few additional maculations on other portions of the surface. The base of the shell is subgranularly striate.

== Distribution ==
This species occurs in the Pacific Ocean off Southwest Baja California, Mexico to Ecuador; and off the Galápagos Islands.
