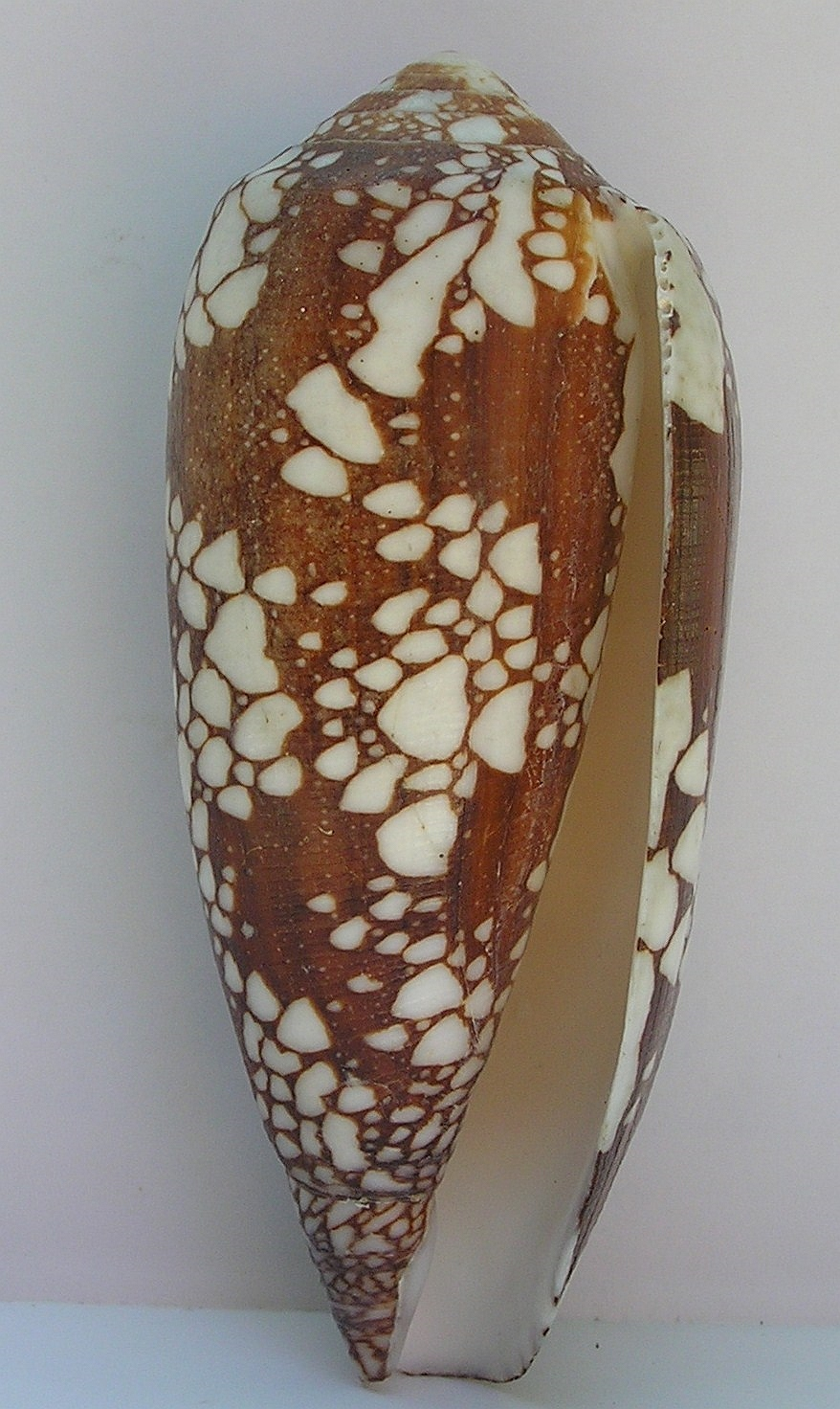
- Apertural view of a shell of Conus aulicus

Conservation status
- Least Concern (IUCN 3.1)

Scientific classification
- Kingdom: Animalia
- Phylum: Mollusca
- Class: Gastropoda
- Subclass: Caenogastropoda
- Order: Neogastropoda
- Superfamily: Conoidea
- Family: Conidae
- Genus: Conus
- Species: C. aulicus

Binomial name
- Conus aulicus Linnaeus, 1758

Synonyms
- Conus (Darioconus) aulicus Linnaeus, 1758 accepted, alternate representation; Conus amadis var. aurantia Dautzenberg, 1937 (invalid: junior homonym of Conus aurantius Hwass in Bruguière, 1792); Conus aulicus var. propenudus Melvill, 1900; Conus aulicus var. roseus G. B. Sowerby II, 1834; Conus auratus Hwass in Bruguière, 1792; Conus aurifer Röding, P.F., 1798; Conus gracianus da Motta, 1982; Conus particolor Perry, 1810; Cucullus aurifer Röding, 1798; Darioconus aulicus (Linnaeus, 1758); Darioconus auratus Hwass, C.H. in Bruguière, J.G., 1792

= Conus aulicus =

Species of sea snail

Conus aulicus, common name the princely cone, is a species of a predatory sea snail, a marine gastropod mollusk in the family Conidae, the cone snails, cone shells or cones.

== Description ==
The size of an adult shell varies between 65 mm and 163 mm. The shell is rather narrow and has an elevated spire. The color of the shell is chocolate-brown, covered by elevated close revolving lines of darker color. The surface is irregularly overlaid by subtriangular white spots, some of which are very large. The operculum is a very minute square on the dorsal surface of the hinder part of the foot.

The proboscis of Conus aulicus is varied with red and white.

== Distribution ==
This marine species occurs in the Indian Ocean off Chagos and Mauritius; in the Indo-Pacific Region (excl. Hawaii).
