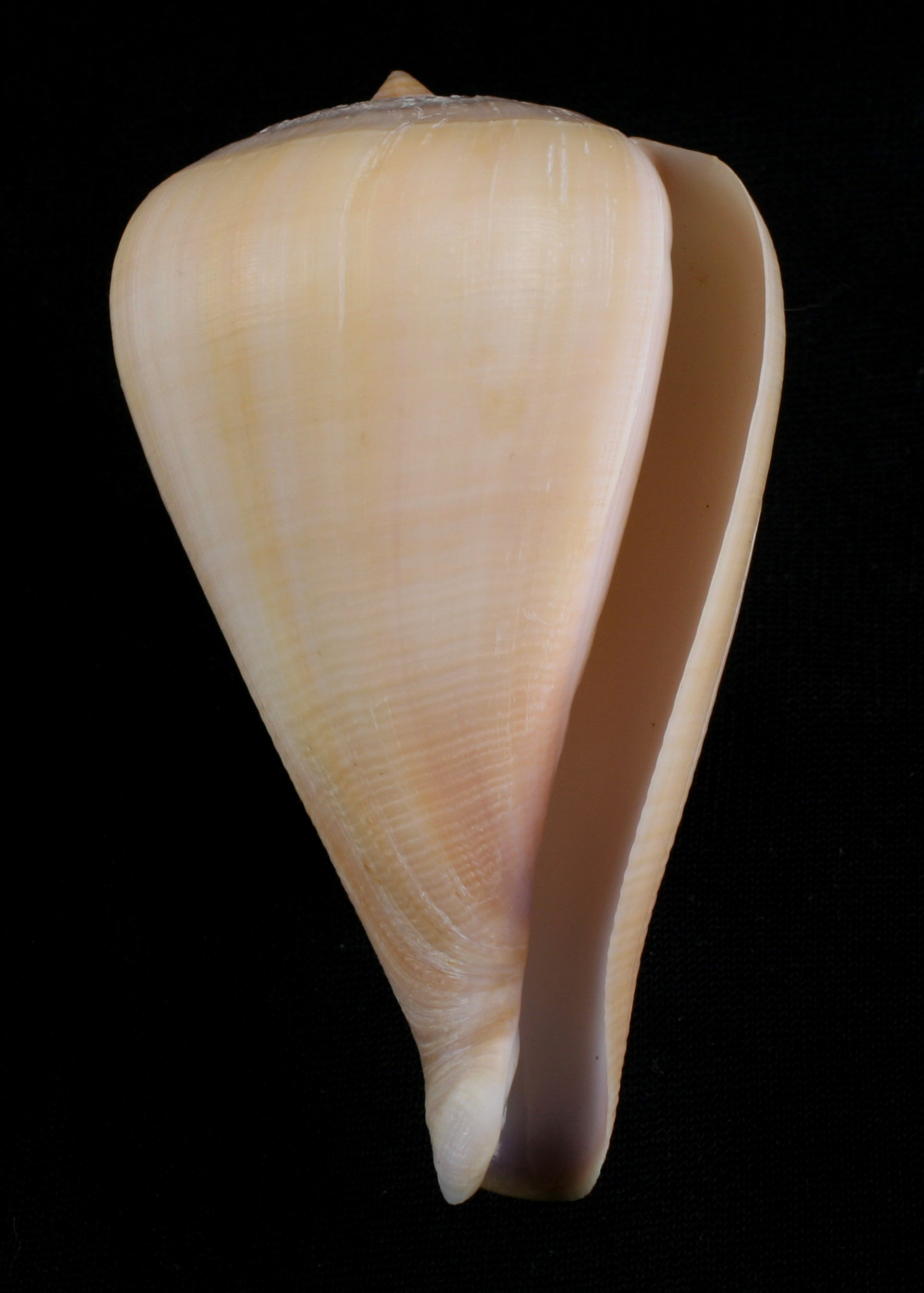
- Apertural view of shell of Conus patricius Hinds, 1843

Scientific classification
- Domain: Eukaryota
- Kingdom: Animalia
- Phylum: Mollusca
- Class: Gastropoda
- Subclass: Caenogastropoda
- Order: Neogastropoda
- Superfamily: Conoidea
- Family: Conidae
- Genus: Conus
- Species: C. patricius

Binomial name
- Conus patricius Hinds, 1843

Synonyms
- Conus (Pyruconus) patricius Hinds, 1843 · accepted, alternate representation; Conus pyriformis Reeve, 1843; Pyruconus patricius (Hinds, 1843)

= Conus patricius =

Species of sea snail

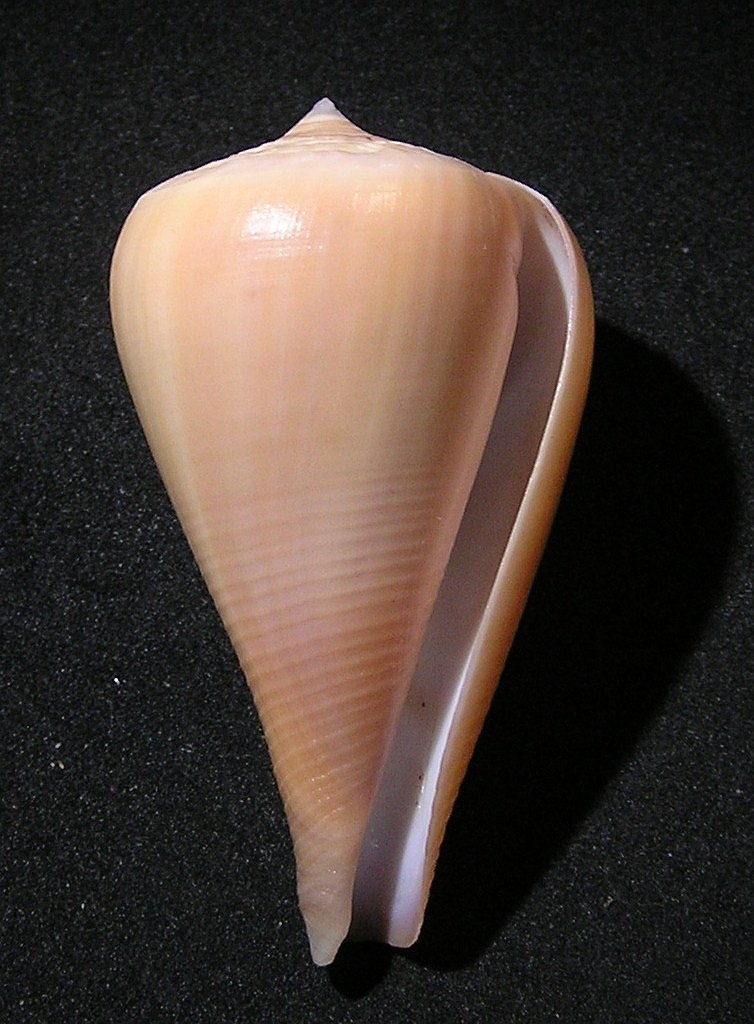
Apertural view of Conus patricius.

Conus patricius, common name the patrician cone, is a species of sea snail, a marine gastropod mollusk in the family Conidae, the cone snails and their allies.

Like all species within the genus Conus, these snails are predatory and venomous. They are capable of stinging humans, therefore live ones should be handled carefully or not at all.

== Description ==
The size of an adult shell varies between 30 mm and 120 mm. The shell has a light flesh-color. The spire is gently acuminate. The earlier whorls are tuberculated. The body whorl is pyriform. The outline is concave below, with revolving striae towards the base.

== Distribution ==
This species is found in the Pacific Ocean from the Gulf of California, Western Mexico, to Ecuador and off the Galápagos Islands.

== Gallery ==
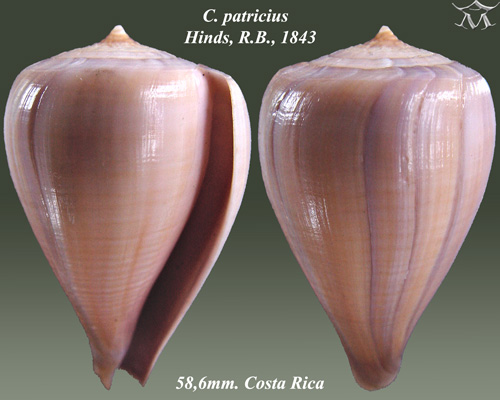
Conus patricius Hinds, R.B., 1843

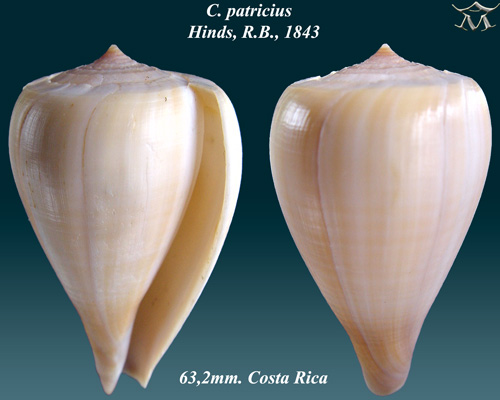
Conus patricius Hinds, R.B., 1843
