= Oenopotinae =

Scientific classification
- Kingdom: Animalia
- Phylum: Mollusca
- Class: Gastropoda
- Subclass: Caenogastropoda
- Order: Neogastropoda
- Family: Mangeliidae
- Subfamily: Oenopotinae; Bogdanov, 1987

Genera
- See text

Synonyms
- Lorinae Thiele, 1925 sensu Thiele

Subfamily of gastropods

Oenopotinae is a subfamily of small to medium-sized sea snails, marine gastropod mollusks in the family Conidae.

This subfamily was introduced by Bogdanov in 1987.

In 2014 this subfamily has been included in the family Mangeliidae

== Description ==
The Oenopotinae are characterized by a thin, elongate-ovate to fusiform shell in the form of a tall spire with a size between 4.7mm and 24.5 mm. They show a present, vestigial or absent operculum and a shallow or inconspicuous sinus. This outer lip (labrum) is thin. The axial ribs are dominant in the sculpture of the shell. The toxoglossate radula has a weak basal ribbon and relatively short marginal teeth with solid base. The tooth cavity opens laterally between the shaft and the base.

== Genera ==
This is a list of the accepted names of genera in the subfamily Oenopotinae : (the main reference for recent species is the World Register of Marine Species)

- Curtitoma Bartsch, 1941
- Granotoma Bartsch, 1941
- Lorabela Powell, 1951
- Nematoma Bartsch, 1941 : synonym of Curtitoma Bartsch, 1941
- Obesotoma Bartsch, 1941
- Oenopota Mörch, 1852
- Oenopotella A. Sysoev, 1988
- Propebela Iredale, 1918
- Venustoma Bartsch, 1941
