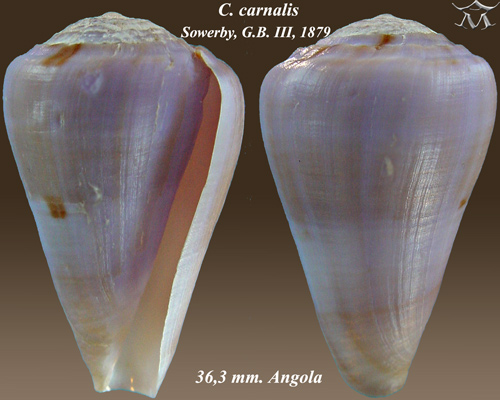
- Apertural and abapertural views of shell of Conus carnalis Sowerby, G.B. III, 1879

Conservation status
- Least Concern (IUCN 3.1)

Scientific classification
- Kingdom: Animalia
- Phylum: Mollusca
- Class: Gastropoda
- Subclass: Caenogastropoda
- Order: Neogastropoda
- Superfamily: Conoidea
- Family: Conidae
- Genus: Conus
- Species: C. carnalis

Binomial name
- Conus carnalis G. B. Sowerby III, 1879

Synonyms
- Conus (Pseudonoduloconus) carnalis G. B. Sowerby III, 1879 accepted, alternate representation; Conus amethystinus Trovão, 1975; Pseudonoduloconus carnalis (G. B. Sowerby III, 1879)

= Conus carnalis =

Species of sea snail

Conus carnalis is a species of sea snail, a marine gastropod mollusk in the family Conidae, the cone snails and their allies.

Like all species within the genus Conus, these snails are predatory and venomous. They are capable of stinging humans, therefore live ones should be handled carefully or not at all.

== Description ==
The length of the shell varies between 34 mm and 63 mm. The shell features a smooth and glossy texture, typically displaying a pattern of spiral ridges interspersed with axial lines. The base of the shell is usually white or light beige, adorned with irregular dark brown or reddish-brown markings. These markings may appear as spots or streaks, creating a contrast against the lighter shell background. The aperture, or opening, of the shell is elongated and narrow, with the interior surface often exhibiting a shiny white appearance.

== Distribution ==
This species occurs in the Atlantic Ocean off Angola.
