= Herndliconus =

Scientific classification
- Kingdom: Animalia
- Phylum: Mollusca
- Class: Gastropoda
- Subclass: Caenogastropoda
- Order: Neogastropoda
- Superfamily: Conoidea
- Family: Conidae
- Genus: †Herndliconus; Petuch & Drolshagen, 2015

Extinct genus of gastropods

Herndliconus is an extinct genus of sea snails, marine gastropod mollusks in the family Conidae.
