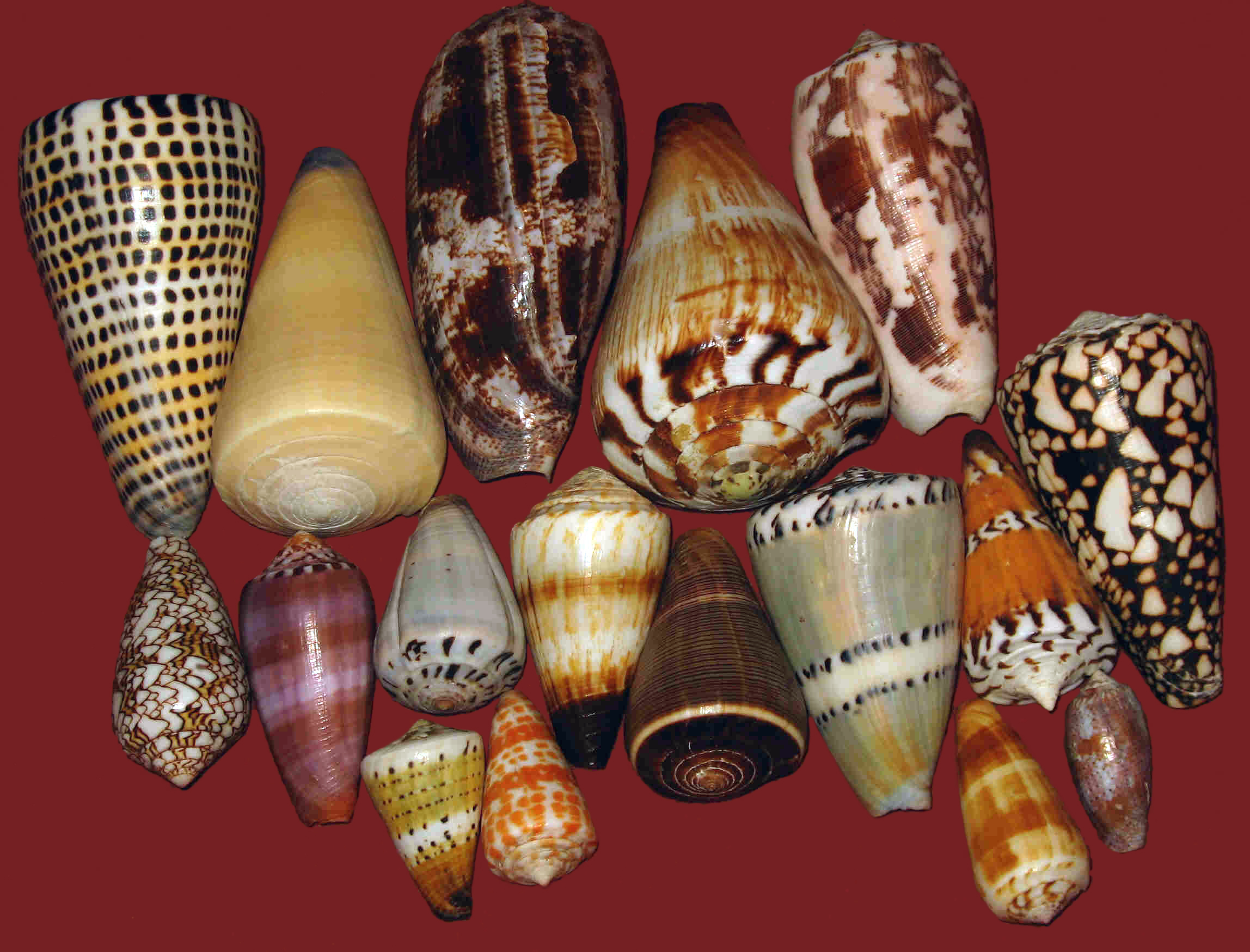
- A group of shells of various species of cone snails

Scientific classification
- Kingdom: Animalia
- Phylum: Mollusca
- Class: Gastropoda
- Subclass: Caenogastropoda
- Order: Neogastropoda
- Superfamily: Conoidea
- Family: Conidae; Fleming, 1822

Subfamilies and genera
- See text

Synonyms
- Californiconinae Tucker & Tenorio, 2009; Conilithidae Tucker & Tenorio, 2009; Profundiconinae Limpalaër & Monnier, 2018; Puncticulinae Tucker & Tenorio, 2009; Taranteconidae Tucker & Tenorio, 2009

= Cone snail =

Family of venomous sea snails

Cone snails, or cones, are highly venomous sea snails that constitute the family Conidae. Conidae is a taxonomic family (previously subfamily) of predatory marine gastropod molluscs in the superfamily Conoidea.

As of 2014, cone snails are the only member of the superfamily Conoidea. Some previous classifications grouped the cone snails in a subfamily, Coninae. As of March 2015 Conidae contained over 800 recognized species, varying widely in size from lengths of 1.3 cm to 21.6 cm. Working in 18th-century Europe, Carl Linnaeus knew of only 30 species that are still considered valid.

Fossils of cone snails have been found from the Eocene to the Holocene epochs. Cone snail species have shells that are roughly conical in shape. Many species have colorful patterning on the shell surface. Cone snails are almost exclusively tropical in distribution.

All cone snails are venomous and capable of stinging. Cone snails use a modified radula tooth and a venom gland to attack and paralyze their prey before engulfing it. The tooth, which is likened to a dart or a harpoon, is barbed and can be extended some distance out from the head of the snail at the end of the proboscis.

Cone snail venoms are mainly peptide-based, and contain many different toxins that vary in their effects. The sting of several larger species of cone snails can be serious, and even fatal to humans. Cone snail venom also shows promise for medical use.

== Distribution and habitat ==
Species in the family Conidae are found in the tropical and subtropical seas of the world, in four biogeographic regions, including: the Indo-Pacific (with 60% of all species), the Tropical Eastern Pacific, the western Tropical Atlantic, and the eastern Tropical Atlantic, plus 10 species in the warm temperate Agulhas bioregion on the southern coast of South Africa. Fewer than one percent of fossil species have been found in more than one of the above regions.

Cone snails are typically found in warm tropical seas and oceans worldwide. Cone snails reach their greatest diversity in the Western Indo-Pacific region. While the majority of cone snails are found in warm tropical waters, some species have adapted to temperate/semi-tropical environments and are endemic to areas such as the Cape coast of South Africa, the Mediterranean, or the cool subtropical waters of southern California (Californiconus californicus).

They live on a variety of substrates, from the intertidal zone and deeper areas, to sand, rocks or coral reefs.

== Paleontology ==
The oldest known fossil of Conidae is from the lower Eocene, about 55 million years ago. Analysis of nucleotide sequences indicate that all living species of Conidae belong to one of two clades that diverged about 33 million years ago. One clade includes most of the species in the eastern Pacific and western Atlantic regions, which were connected by the Central American Seaway until the emergence of the Isthmus of Panama less than three million years ago. The other clade includes most of the species in the eastern Atlantic and Indo-Pacific regions, which were connected by the Neo-Tethys Sea until 21 to 24 million years ago.

== Shell ==
Cone snails have a large variety of shell colors and patterns, with local varieties and color forms of the same species often occurring. This variety in color and pattern has led to the creation of a large number of known synonyms and probable synonyms, making it difficult to give an exact taxonomic assignment for many snails in this genus. As of 2009, more than 3,200 different species names have been assigned, with an average of 16 new species names introduced each year.

The shells of cone snails vary in size and are conical in shape. The shell is whorled in the form of an inverted cone, with the anterior end being narrower. The protruding parts of the top of the whorls, that form the spire, are in the shape of another more flattened cone. The aperture is elongated and narrow with the sharp operculum being very small. The outer lip is simple, thin, and sharp, without a callus, and has a notched tip at the upper part. The columella is straight.

The larger species of cone snails can grow up to 23 cm (9.1 in) in length. The shells of cone snails are often brightly colored with a variety of patterns. Some species color patterns may be partially or completely hidden under an opaque layer of periostracum. In other species, the topmost shell layer is a thin periostracum that is a transparent yellowish or brownish membrane.

== Physiology and behavior ==
The snails within this family are sophisticated predatory animals. They hunt and immobilize prey using a modified radular tooth along with a venom gland containing neurotoxins; the tooth is launched out of the snail's mouth in a harpoon-like action.

Cone snails are carnivorous. Their prey consists of marine worms, small fish, molluscs, and other cone snails. Cone snails are slow-moving, and use their venomous harpoon to disable faster-moving prey.

The osphradium in cone snails is more specialized than in other groups of gastropods. It is through this sensory modality that cone snails are able to sense their prey. The cone snails immobilize their prey using a modified, dartlike, barbed radular tooth, made of chitin, along with a venom gland containing neurotoxins.

Molecular phylogeny research has shown that preying on fish has evolved at least twice independently in cone snails. Some species appear to have also evolved prey mimicry, where they release chemicals that resemble the sex pheromones certain ragworms release during their short breeding season. The researchers hypothesize that these chemicals cause the prey to be more easily harpooned, but are still uncertain as to exactly how this occurs in the wild.

=== Harpoon ===
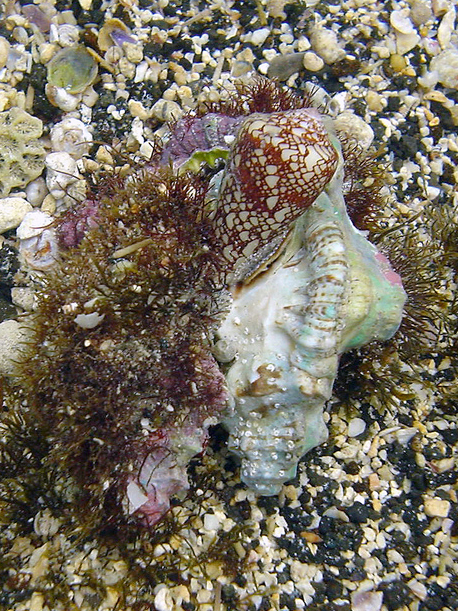
An individual (Conus pennaceus) attacking one of a cluster of three snails of the species Cymatium nicobaricum, in Hawaii

Cone snails use a harpoon-like structure called a radula tooth for predation. Radula teeth are modified teeth, primarily made of chitin and formed inside the mouth of the snail, in a structure known as the toxoglossan radula. Each specialized cone snail tooth is stored in the radula sac, except for the tooth that is in current use.

Cone snails employ two main hunting strategies: vermivores typically use a 'sting and retract' method, injecting venom directly into the worm. They patiently hunt, sting the worm, wait for it to be paralyzed, and then ingest it. This is a deliberate, slower process. In contrast, piscivores (fish-hunters) often employ a sophisticated 'venom net' strategy, releasing toxins into the surrounding water to instantly paralyze the prey before delivering the harpoon. The harpoon is then used to pull the paralyzed fish into the mouth. The snail engulfs it and may release further enzymes to liquefy the tissue, which is then consumed as fluid.

The radula tooth is hollow and barbed, and is attached to the tip of the radula in the radular sac, inside the snail's throat. When the snail detects a prey animal nearby, it extends a long flexible tube called a proboscis towards the prey. The radula tooth is loaded with venom from the venom bulb and, still attached to the radula, is fired from the proboscis into the prey by a powerful muscular contraction. The venom can paralyze smaller fish almost instantly. The snail then retracts the radula, drawing the subdued prey into the mouth. After the prey has been digested, the cone snail will regurgitate any indigestible material, such as spines and scales, along with the harpoon. There is always a radular tooth in the radular sac. A tooth may also be used in self-defense when the snail feels threatened.

The harpoon attack of the species Conus catus has been found to be one of the fastest complete movements recorded in animals, with a maximum speed of 90 km/h (56 mph), an acceleration of 400,000 m/s^{2}, and a deceleration of 700,000 m/s^{2}. The speed of other animals such as the peacock mantis shrimp and the trap-jaw ant was measured at the free end of a fixed appendage, while the speed of the harpoon was measured from its base and traveling inside the proboscis.

The reason for this speed relies in hydrostatic pressure by the fluid inside the proboscis which propels the harpoon inside until it is almost completely out. A sphincter acts as a valve to keep fluid in the proximal half and in the distal half a constriction of ephitelial tissue together with a thicker harpoon base helps to build up hydrostatic pressure when the sphincter opens. The deceleration may help release the venom from the harpoon.

=== Venom ===
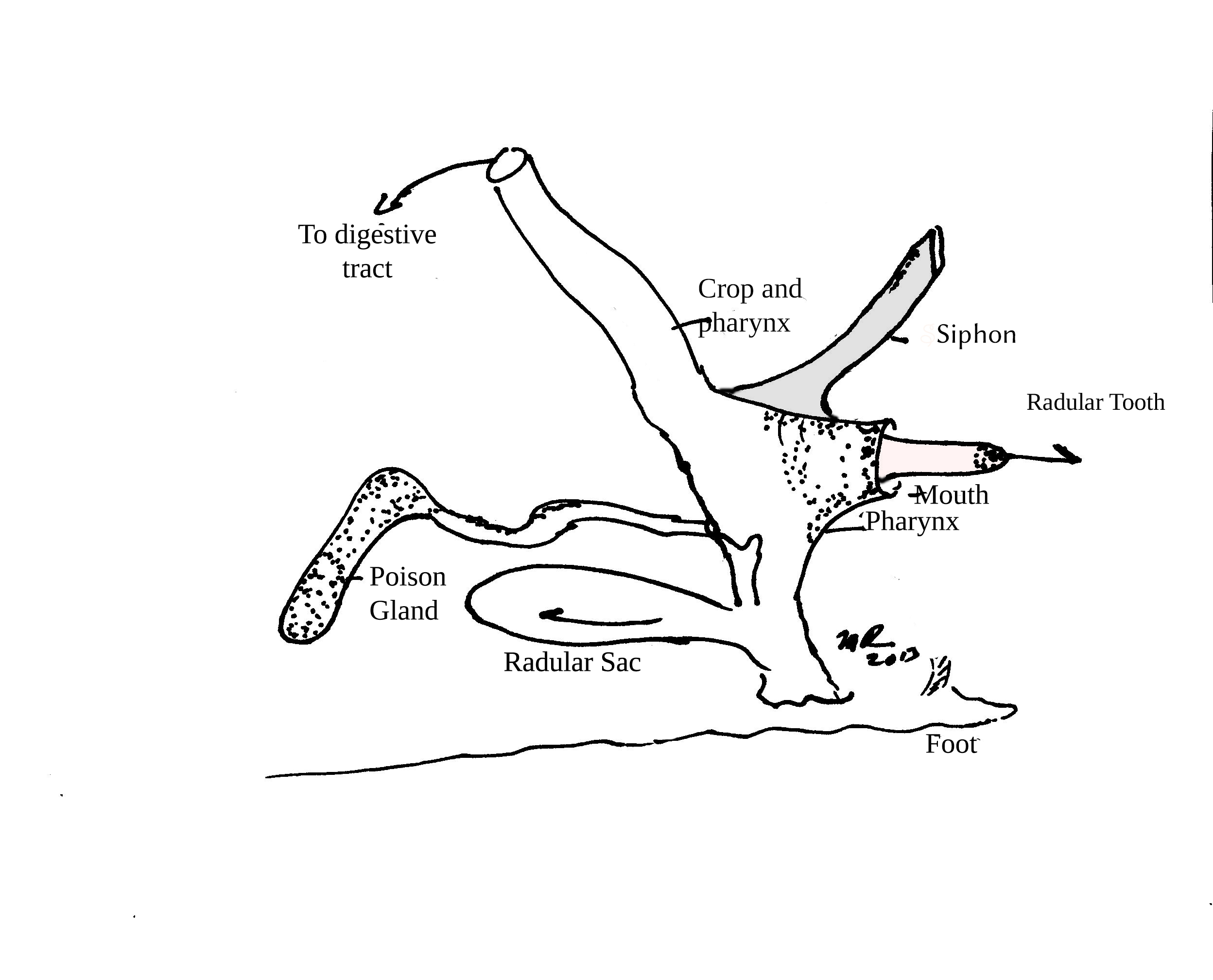
Cone snail venom apparatus

There are approximately 30 records of humans killed by cone snails. Human victims suffer little pain, because the venom contains an analgesic component. Some species reportedly can kill a human in under five minutes, thus the name "cigarette snail" as supposedly one only has time to smoke a cigarette before dying. Cone snails can sting through a wetsuit with their harpoon-like radular tooth, which resembles a transparent needle.

Normally, cone snails (and many species in the superfamily Conoidea) use their venom to immobilize prey before engulfing it. The venom consists of a mixture of peptides, called conopeptides. The venom is typically made up of 10 to 30 amino acids, but in some species as many as 60. The venom of each cone snail species may contain as many as 200 pharmacologically active components. It is estimated that more than 50,000 conopeptides can be found, because every species of cone snail is thought to produce its own specific venom.

Cone-snail venom has come to interest biotechnologists and pharmacists because of its potential medicinal properties. Production of synthetic conopeptides has started, using solid-phase peptide synthesis.

A component of the venom of Conus magus, ω-conotoxin, is now marketed as the analgesic ziconotide, which is used as a last resort in chronic and severe pain. Conopeptides are also being looked at as anti-epileptic agents and to help stop nerve-cell death after a stroke or head injury. Conopeptides also have potential in helping against spasms due to spinal cord injuries, and may be helpful in diagnosing and treating small cell carcinomas in the lung.

The biotechnology surrounding cone snails and their venom has promise for medical breakthroughs; with more than 50,000 conopeptides to study, the possibilities are numerous.

== Reproduction ==
Most cone snails appear to reproduce sexually, with separate sexes and internal fertilization. Varying numbers of eggs in egg capsules are laid in substrate by cone snails. Hatchlings are of two types, the veligers (larvae that swim freely) and veliconcha (baby snail).

== Relevance to humans ==
Because all cone snails are venomous and capable of stinging humans, live ones should be handled with great care or not at all.

=== Dangers ===
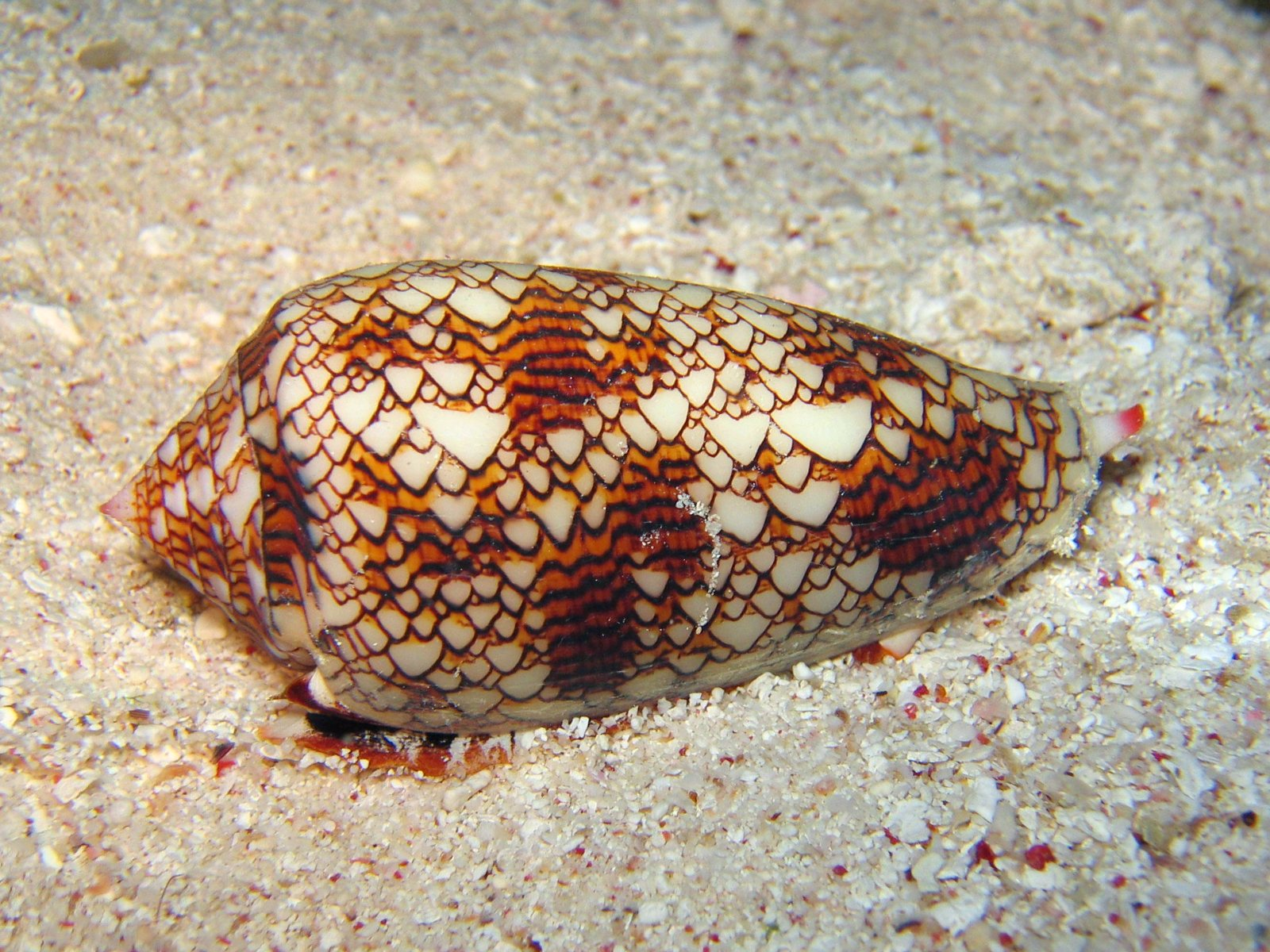
A live textile cone (Conus textile), one of several species whose venom can cause serious harm to a human

Cone snails are prized for their brightly colored and patterned shells, which may tempt people to pick them up. This is risky, as the snail often fires its harpoon in self defense when disturbed. The harpoons of some of the larger species of cone snail can penetrate gloves or wetsuits.

The sting of many of the smallest cone species may be no worse than a bee or hornet sting, but the sting of a few of the larger tropical fish-eating species, such as Conus geographus (geography cone), Conus tulipa and Conus striatus, can be fatal. Other dangerous species are Conus pennaceus, Conus textile, Conus aulicus, Conus magus and Conus marmoreus. According to Goldfrank's Toxicologic Emergencies, about 27 human deaths can be confidently attributed to cone snail envenomation, though the actual number is almost certainly much higher; some three dozen people are estimated to have died from geography cone envenomation alone.

Most of the cone snails that hunt worms are not a risk to humans, with the exception of larger species. One of the fish-eating species, the geography cone, is also known colloquially as the "cigarette snail", a gallows humor exaggeration implying that, when stung by this creature, the victim will have only enough time to smoke a cigarette before dying.

Symptoms of a more serious cone snail sting include severe, localized pain, swelling, numbness and tingling, and vomiting. Symptoms can start immediately or can be delayed for days. Severe cases involve muscle paralysis, changes in vision and respiratory failure that can lead to death. If stung, one should seek medical attention as soon as possible.

=== Medical use ===
The appeal of conotoxins for creating pharmaceutical drugs is the precision and speed with which the chemicals act; many of the compounds target only a particular class of receptor. This means that they can reliably and quickly produce a particular effect on the body's systems without side effects; for example, almost instantly reducing heart rate or turning off the signaling of a single class of nerve, such as pain receptors.

Ziconotide, a powerful atypical painkiller, was initially isolated from the venom of the magician cone snail, Conus magus. It was approved by the U.S. Food and Drug Administration in December 2004 under the name Prialt. Other drugs based on cone snail venom targeting Alzheimer's disease, Parkinson's disease, depression, and epilepsy are in clinical or preclinical trials.

Many peptides produced by the cone snails show prospects for being potent pharmaceuticals, such as AVC1, isolated from the Australian species, the Queen Victoria cone, Conus victoriae, and have been highly effective in treating postsurgical and neuropathic pain, even accelerating recovery from nerve injury.

Geography and tulip cone snails, as well as the Conus kinoshitai, are known to secrete a type of insulin that paralyzes nearby fish by causing hypoglycaemic shock. They are the only two non-human animal species known to use insulin as a weapon. Cone snail insulin is capable of binding to human insulin receptors and researchers are studying its use as a potent fast-acting therapeutic insulin.

=== Shell collecting ===
The intricate color patterns of cone snails have made them one of the most popular species for shell collectors.

Conus gloriamaris, also known as "Glory of the Seas", one of the most famous and sought-after seashells in past centuries, with only a few specimens in private collections. The rarity of this species' shells led to high market prices for the objects, until the habitat of this cone snail was discovered, which decreased prices dramatically.

=== As jewelry ===
Naturally occurring, beach-worn cone shell tops can function as beads without any further modification. In Hawaii, these natural beads were traditionally collected from the beach drift to make puka shell jewelry. Since it is difficult to obtain enough naturally occurring cone snail tops, almost all modern puka shell jewelry uses cheaper imitations, cut from thin shells of other species of mollusk, or made of plastic.

== Species ==
Until 2009 all species within the family Conidae were placed in one genus, Conus. Testing of the molecular phylogeny of the Conidae was first conducted by Christopher Meyer and Alan Kohn, and has continued, particularly with the advent of nuclear DNA testing.

In 2009, J.K. Tucker and M.J. Tenorio proposed a classification system consisting of three distinct families and 82 genera for living species of cone snails. This classification is based on shell morphology, radular differences, anatomy, physiology, and cladistics, with comparisons to molecular (DNA) studies. Published accounts of Conidae that use these new genera include J.K. Tucker & M.J. Tenorio (2009), and Bouchet et al. (2011). Tucker and Tenorio's proposed classification system for the cone shells and other clades of Conoidean gastropods is shown in Tucker & Tenorio cone snail taxonomy 2009.

Some experts, however, still prefer to use the traditional classification. For example, in the November 2011 version of the World Register of Marine Species, all species within the family Conidae were placed in the genus Conus. The binomial names of species in the 82 genera of living cone snails listed in Tucker & Tenorio 2009 were recognized by the World Register of Marine Species as "alternative representations". Debate within the scientific community regarding this issue has continued, and additional molecular phylogeny studies are being carried out in an attempt to clarify the issue.

In 2015, in the Journal of Molluscan Studies, Puillandre, Duda, Meyer, Olivera & Bouchet presented a new classification for the old genus Conus. Using 329 species, the authors carried out molecular phylogenetic analyses. The results suggested that the authors should place all cone snails in a single family, Conidae, containing four genera: Conus, Conasprella, Profundiconus and Californiconus. The authors group 85% of all known cone snail species under Conus. They recognize 57 subgenera within Conus, and 11 subgenera within the genus Conasprella.

== Current taxonomy ==
In the Journal of Molluscan Studies, in 2014, Puillandre, Duda, Meyer, Olivera & Bouchet presented a new classification for the old genus Conus. Using 329 species, the authors carried out molecular phylogenetic analyses. The results suggested that the authors should place all living cone snails in a single family, Conidae, containing the following genera:

- Californiconus J. K. Tucker & Tenorio, 2009
- Conasprella Thiele, 1929
- † Conilithes Swainson, 1840
- † Contraconus Olsson & Harbison, 1953
- Conus Linnaeus, 1758
- † Eoconus J. K. Tucker & Tenorio, 2009
- † Hemiconus Cossmann, 1889
- † Herndliconus Petuch & Drolshagen, 2015
- Kenyonia Brazier, 1896
- Lilliconus G. Raybaudi Massilia, 1994
- Malagasyconus Monnier & Tenorio, 2015
- † Papilliconus Tracey & Craig, 2017
- Profundiconus Kuroda, 1956
- Pseudolilliconus J. K. Tucker & Tenorio, 2009
- Pygmaeconus Puillandre & Tenorio, 2017
- † Tequestaconus Petuch & Drolshagen, 2015 †

The authors grouped 85% of all known cone snail species under Conus. They recognized 57 subgenera within Conus, and 11 subgenera within the genus Conasprella.

== History of the taxonomy ==
Prior to 1993, the family Conidae contained only Conus species. In 1993 significant taxonomic changes were proposed by Taylor, et al.,: the family Conidae was redefined as several subfamilies. The subfamilies included many subfamilies that had previously been classified in the family Turridae, and the Conus species were moved to the subfamily Coninae.

In further taxonomic changes that took place in 2009 and 2011, based upon molecular phylogeny (see below), the subfamilies that were previously in the family Turridae were elevated to the status of families in their own right. This left the family Conidae once again containing only those species that were traditionally placed in that family: the cone snail species.

=== 1993, Taylor et al., Bouchet & Rocroi ===
According to Taylor, et al. (1993), and the taxonomy of the Gastropoda by Bouchet & Rocroi, 2005, this family consisted of seven subfamilies.

- Coninae Fleming, 1822 — synonyms: Conulinae Rafinesque, 1815 (inv.); Textiliinae da Motta, 1995 (n.a.)
- Clathurellinae H. Adams & A. Adams, 1858 — synonyms: Defranciinae Gray, 1853 (inv.); Borsoniinae A. Bellardi, 1875; Pseudotominae A. Bellardi, 1888; Diptychomitrinae L. Bellardi, 1888; Mitrolumnidae Sacco, 1904; Mitromorphinae Casey, 1904; Lorinae Thiele, 1925
- Conorbiinae de Gregorio, 1880—synonym: Cryptoconinae Cossmann, 1896
- Mangeliinae P. Fischer, 1883—synonym: Cytharinae Thiele, 1929
- Oenopotinae Bogdanov, 1987—synonym: Lorinae Thiele, 1925 sensu Thiele
- Raphitominae A. Bellardi, 1875—synonyms: Daphnellinae Casey, 1904; Taraninae Casey, 1904; Thatcheriidae Powell, 1942; Pleurotomellinae F. Nordsieck, 1968; Andoniinae Vera-Pelaez, 2002
- † Siphopsinae Le Renard, 1995

=== 2009, Tucker & Tenorio ===
In 2009 John K. Tucker and Manuel J. Tenorio proposed a classification system for the cone shells and their allies (which resorb their inner walls during growth) was based upon a cladistical analysis of anatomical characters including the radular tooth, the morphology (i.e., shell characters), as well as an analysis of prior molecular phylogeny studies, all of which were used to construct phylogenetic trees. In their phylogeny, Tucker and Tenorio noted the close relationship of the cone species within the various clades, corresponding to their proposed families and genera; this also corresponded to the results of prior molecular studies by Puillandre et al. and others. This 2009 proposed classification system also outlined the taxonomy for the other clades of Conoidean gastropods (that do not resorb their inner walls), also based upon morphological, anatomical, and molecular studies, and removes the turrid snails (which are a distinct large and diverse group) from the cone snails, and creates a number of new families. Tucker and Tenorio's proposed classification system for the cone shells and their allies (and the other clades of Conoidean gastropods ) is shown in Tucker & Tenorio cone snail taxonomy 2009.

=== 2011, Bouchet et al. ===
In 2011 Bouchet et al. proposed a new classification in which several subfamilies were raised to the rank of family:

- Clathurellinae was split into three families: Borsoniidae (also including species from Turridae), Mitromorphidae and Clathurellidae (all previously lumped under the Turridae).
- Conorbiinae was raised to the rank of family Conorbidae, consisting of three genera: Artemidiconus da Motta, 1991, Benthofascis Iredale, 1936, and Conorbis Swainson, 1840.
- Mangeliinae and Oenopotinae were combined and raised to the rank of family Mangeliidae, which had previously been lumped in the Turridae).
- Raphitominae was raised to the rank of family Raphitomidae (also previously lumped in the Turridae).

The classification by Bouchet et al. (2011) was based on mitochondrial DNA and nuclear DNA testing, and built on the prior work by J.K. Tucker & M.J. Tenorio (2009), but did not include fossil taxa.

Molecular phylogeny, particularly with the advent of nuclear DNA testing in addition to the mDNA testing (testing in the Conidae initially began by Christopher Meyer and Alan Kohn), is continuing on the Conidae.

=== 2009, 2011, list of genera from Tucker & Tenorio, and Bouchet et al. ===
This is a list of what were recognized extant genera within Conidae as per J.K. Tucker & M.J. Tenorio (2009), and Bouchet et al. (2011): However, all these genera have become synonyms of subgenera within the genus Conus as per the revision of the taxonomy of the Conidae in 2015

- Afonsoconus Tucker & Tenorio, 2013: synonym of Conus (Afonsoconus) Tucker & Tenorio, 2013 represented as Conus Linnaeus, 1758
- Africonus Petuch, 1975: synonym of Conus (Lautoconus) Monterosato, 1923 represented as Conus Linnaeus, 1758
- Arubaconus Petuch, 2013: synonym of Conus (Ductoconus) da Motta, 1991 represented as Conus Linnaeus, 1758
- Asprella Schaufuss, 1869: synonym of Conus (Asprella) Schaufuss, 1869 represented as Conus Linnaeus, 1758
- Atlanticonus Petuch & Sargent, 2012: synonym of Conus (Atlanticonus) Petuch & Sargent, 2012 represented as Conus Linnaeus, 1758
- Attenuiconus Petuch, 2013: synonym of Conus (Attenuiconus) Petuch, 2013 represented as Conus Linnaeus, 1758
- Austroconus Tucker & Tenorio, 2009 synonym of Conus (Austroconus) Tucker & Tenorio, 2009 represented as Conus Linnaeus, 1758
- Bathyconus Tucker & Tenorio, 2009: synonym of Conasprella (Fusiconus) Thiele, 1929, represented as Conasprella Thiele, 1929
- Bermudaconus Petuch, 2013: synonym of Conus (Bermudaconus) Petuch, 2013 represented as Conus Linnaeus, 1758
- Boucheticonus Tucker & Tenorio, 2013: synonym of Conasprella (Boucheticonus) Tucker & Tenorio, 2013 represented as Conasprella Thiele, 1929
- Brasiliconus Petuch, 2013: synonym of Conus (Brasiliconus) Petuch, 2013 represented as Conus Linnaeus, 1758
- Calamiconus Tucker & Tenorio, 2009: synonym of Conus (Lividoconus) Wils, 1970 represented as Conus Linnaeus, 1758
- Calibanus da Motta, 1991: synonym of Conus (Calibanus) da Motta, 1991 represented as Conus Linnaeus, 1758
- Cariboconus Petuch, 2003: synonym of Conus (Dauciconus) Cotton, 1945 represented as Conus Linnaeus, 1758
- Californiconus Tucker & Tenorio, 2009
- Chelyconus Mörch, 1852: synonym of Conus (Chelyconus) Mörch, 1852 represented as Conus Linnaeus, 1758
- Cleobula Iredale, 1930: synonym of Dendroconus Swainson, 1840
- Coltroconus Petuch, 2013: synonym of Conasprella (Coltroconus) Petuch, 2013 represented as Conasprella Thiele, 1929
- Conasprella Thiele, 1929: accepted name
- Conasprelloides Tucker & Tenorio, 2009: synonym of Conus (Dauciconus) Cotton, 1945 represented as Conus Linnaeus, 1758
- † Conilithes Swainson, 1840
- Continuconus Tucker & Tenorio, 2013
- Conus Linnaeus, 1758: accepted name
- Cornutoconus Suzuki, 1972: synonym of Taranteconus Azuma, 1972
- Coronaxis Swainson, 1840: synonym of Conus (Conus) Linnaeus, 1758 represented as Conus Linnaeus, 1758
- Cucullus Röding, 1798: synonym of Conus (Conus) Linnaeus, 1758 represented as Conus Linnaeus, 1758
- Cylinder Montfort, 1810: synonym of Conus (Cylinder) Montfort, 1810 represented as Conus Linnaeus, 1758
- Cylindrella Swainson, 1840: synonym of Asprella Schaufuss, 1869synonym of Conus (Asprella) Schaufuss, 1869 represented as Conus Linnaeus, 1758
- Cylindrus Batsch, 1789: synonym of Cylinder Montfort, 1810synonym of Conus (Cylinder) Montfort, 1810 represented as Conus Linnaeus, 1758
- Dalliconus Tucker & Tenorio, 2009: synonym of Conasprella (Dalliconus) Tucker & Tenorio, 2009 synonym of Conasprella Thiele, 1929
- Darioconus Iredale, 1930: synonym of Conus (Darioconus) Iredale, 1930 represented as Conus Linnaeus, 1758
- Dauciconus Cotton, 1945: synonym of Conus (Dauciconus) Cotton, 1945 represented as Conus Linnaeus, 1758
- Dendroconus Swainson, 1840: synonym of Conus (Dendroconus) Swainson, 1840 represented as Conus Linnaeus, 1758
- Ductoconus da Motta, 1991: synonym of Conus (Ductoconus) da Motta, 1991 represented as Conus Linnaeus, 1758
- Duodenticonus Tucker & Tenorio, 2013: synonym of Conasprella (Conasprella) Thiele, 1929 represented as Conasprella Thiele, 1929
- Dyraspis Iredale, 1949: synonym of Conus (Virroconus) Iredale, 1930 represented as Conus Linnaeus, 1758
- Elisaconus Tucker & Tenorio, 2013: synonym of Conus (Elisaconus) Tucker & Tenorio, 2013 represented as Conus Linnaeus, 1758
- Embrikena Iredale, 1937: synonym of Conus (Embrikena) Iredale, 1937 represented as Conus Linnaeus, 1758
- Endemoconus Iredale, 1931: synonym of Conasprella (Endemoconus) Iredale, 1931 represented as Conasprella Thiele, 1929
- Eremiconus Tucker & Tenorio, 2009: synonym of Conus (Eremiconus) Tucker & Tenorio, 2009 represented as Conus Linnaeus, 1758
- Erythroconus da Motta, 1991: synonym of Conus (Darioconus) Iredale, 1930 represented as Conus Linnaeus, 1758
- Eugeniconus da Motta, 1991: synonym of Conus (Eugeniconus) da Motta, 1991 represented as Conus Linnaeus, 1758
- Floraconus Iredale, 1930: synonym of Conus (Floraconus) Iredale, 1930 represented as Conus Linnaeus, 1758
- Fraterconus Tucker & Tenorio, 2013: synonym of Conus (Fraterconus) Tucker & Tenorio, 2013 represented as Conus Linnaeus, 1758
- Fulgiconus da Motta, 1991: synonym of Conus (Phasmoconus) Mörch, 1852 represented as Conus Linnaeus, 1758
- Fumiconus da Motta, 1991: synonym of Conasprella (Fusiconus) da Motta, 1991 represented as Conasprella Thiele, 1929
- Fusiconus da Motta, 1991: synonym of Conasprella (Fusiconus) da Motta, 1991 represented as Conasprella Thiele, 1929
- Gastridium Modeer, 1793: synonym of Conus (Gastridium) Modeer, 1793 represented as Conus Linnaeus, 1758
- Genuanoconus Tucker & Tenorio, 2009: synonym of Conus (Kalloconus) da Motta, 1991 represented as Conus Linnaeus, 1758
- Gladioconus Tucker & Tenorio, 2009: synonym of Conus (Monteiroconus) da Motta, 1991 represented as Conus Linnaeus, 1758
- Globiconus Tucker & Tenorio, 2009: synonym of Conasprella (Ximeniconus) Emerson & Old, 1962 represented as Conasprella Thiele, 1929
- Gradiconus da Motta, 1991: synonym of Conus (Dauciconus) Cotton, 1945 represented as Conus Linnaeus, 1758
- Graphiconus da Motta, 1991: synonym of Conus (Phasmoconus) Mörch, 1852 represented as Conus Linnaeus, 1758
- Harmoniconus da Motta, 1991: synonym of Conus (Harmoniconus) da Motta, 1991 represented as Conus Linnaeus, 1758
- Hermes Montfort, 1810: synonym of Conus (Hermes) Montfort, 1810 represented as Conus Linnaeus, 1758
- Heroconus da Motta, 1991: synonym of Conus (Pionoconus) Mörch, 1852 represented as Conus Linnaeus, 1758
- Isoconus Tucker & Tenorio, 2013: synonym of Conus (Splinoconus) da Motta, 1991 represented as Conus Linnaeus, 1758
- Jaspidiconus Petuch, 2004: synonym of Conasprella (Ximeniconus) Emerson & Old, 1962 represented as Conasprella Thiele, 1929
- Kalloconus da Motta, 1991: synonym of Conus (Kalloconus) da Motta, 1991 represented as Conus Linnaeus, 1758
- Kellyconus Petuch, 2013: synonym of Conus (Kellyconus) Petuch, 2013 represented as Conus Linnaeus, 1758
- Kenyonia Brazier, 1896: genus incertae sedis
- Kermasprella Powell, 1958: synonym of Conasprella (Endemoconus) Iredale, 1931 represented as Conasprella Thiele, 1929
- Ketyconus da Motta, 1991: synonym of Conus (Floraconus) Iredale, 1930 represented as Conus Linnaeus, 1758
- Kioconus da Motta, 1991: synonym of Conus (Splinoconus) da Motta, 1991 represented as Conus Linnaeus, 1758
- Klemaeconus Tucker & Tenorio, 2013: synonym of Conus (Klemaeconus) Tucker & Tenorio, 2013 represented as Conus Linnaeus, 1758
- Kohniconus Tucker & Tenorio, 2009: synonym of Conasprella (Kohniconus) Tucker & Tenorio, 2009 represented as Conasprella Thiele, 1929
- Kurodaconus Shikama & Habe, 1968: synonym of Conus (Turriconus) Shikama & Habe, 1968 represented as Conus Linnaeus, 1758
- Lamniconus da Motta, 1991: synonym of Conus (Lamniconus) da Motta, 1991 represented as Conus Linnaeus, 1758
- Lautoconus Monterosato, 1923: synonym of Conus (Lautoconus) Monterosato, 1923 represented as Conus Linnaeus, 1758
- Leporiconus Iredale, 1930: synonym of Conus (Leporiconus) Iredale, 1930 represented as Conus Linnaeus, 1758
- Leptoconus Swainson, 1840: synonym of Conus (Leptoconus) Swainson, 1840 represented as Conus Linnaeus, 1758
- Lilliconus Raybaudi Massilia, 1994: synonym of Conasprella (Lilliconus) G. Raybaudi Massilia, 1994 represented as Conasprella Thiele, 1929
- Lindaconus Petuch, 2002: synonym of Conus (Lindaconus) Petuch, 2002 represented as Conus Linnaeus, 1758
- Lithoconus Mörch, 1852: synonym of Conus (Lithoconus) Mörch, 1852 represented as Conus Linnaeus, 1758
- Lividoconus Wils, 1970: synonym of Conus (Lividoconus) Wils, 1970 represented as Conus Linnaeus, 1758
- Lizaconus da Motta, 1991synonym of Profundiconus Kuroda, 1956
- Magelliconus da Motta, 1991: synonym of Conus (Dauciconus) Cotton, 1945 represented as Conus Linnaeus, 1758
- Malagasyconus Monnier & Tenorio, 2015
- Mamiconus Cotton & Godfrey, 1932: synonym of Endemoconus Iredale, 1931synonym of Conasprella (Endemoconus) Iredale, 1931 represented as Conasprella Thiele, 1929
- Miliariconus Tucker & Tenorio, 2009: synonym of Conus (Virroconus) Iredale, 1930 represented as Conus Linnaeus, 1758
- Mitraconus Tucker & Tenorio, 2013: synonym of Conus (Turriconus) Shikama & Habe, 1968 represented as Conus Linnaeus, 1758
- Monteiroconus da Motta, 1991: synonym of Conus (Monteiroconus) da Motta, 1991 represented as Conus Linnaeus, 1758
- Nataliconus Tucker & Tenorio, 2009: synonym of Conus (Leptoconus) Swainson, 1840 represented as Conus Linnaeus, 1758
- Nimboconus Tucker & Tenorio, 2013: synonym of Conus (Phasmoconus) Mörch, 1852 represented as Conus Linnaeus, 1758
- Nitidoconus Tucker & Tenorio, 2013: synonym of Conus (Splinoconus) da Motta, 1991 represented as Conus Linnaeus, 1758
- Ongoconus da Motta, 1991: synonym of Conus (Splinoconus) da Motta, 1991 represented as Conus Linnaeus, 1758
- Papyriconus Tucker & Tenorio, 2013: synonym of Conus (Papyriconus) Tucker & Tenorio, 2013 represented as Conus Linnaeus, 1758
- Parviconus Cotton & Godfrey, 1932: synonym of Conasprella (Parviconus) Cotton & Godfrey, 1932 represented as Conasprella Thiele, 1929
- Perplexiconus Tucker & Tenorio, 2009: synonym of Conasprella (Ximeniconus) Emerson & Old, 1962 represented as Conasprella Thiele, 1929
- Phasmoconus Mörch, 1852: synonym of Conus (Phasmoconus) Mörch, 1852 represented as Conus Linnaeus, 1758
- Pionoconus Mörch, 1852: synonym of Conus (Pionoconus) Mörch, 1852 represented as Conus Linnaeus, 1758
- Plicaustraconus Moolenbeek, 2008: synonym of Conus (Plicaustraconus) Moolenbeek, 2008 represented as Conus Linnaeus, 1758
- Poremskiconus Petuch, 2013: synonym of Conus (Dauciconus) Cotton, 1945 represented as Conus Linnaeus, 1758
- Profundiconus Kuroda, 1956: accepted name
- Protoconus da Motta, 1991: synonym of Tenorioconus Petuch & Drolshagen, 2011
- Protostrioconus Tucker & Tenorio, 2009: synonym of Conus (Gastridium) Modeer, 1793 represented as Conus Linnaeus, 1758
- Pseudoconorbis Tucker & Tenorio, 2009: synonym of Conasprella (Pseudoconorbis) Tucker & Tenorio, 2009, represented as Conasprella Thiele, 1929
- Pseudohermes Tucker & Tenorio, 2013: synonym of Conus (Virgiconus) Cotton, 1945 represented as Conus Linnaeus, 1758
- Pseudolilliconus Tucker & Tenorio, 2009: synonym of Conus (Pseudolilliconus) Tucker & Tenorio, 2009 represented as Conus Linnaeus, 1758
- Pseudonoduloconus Tucker & Tenorio, 2009: synonym of Conus (Pseudonoduloconus) Tucker & Tenorio, 2009 represented as Conus Linnaeus, 1758
- Pseudopterygia Tucker & Tenorio, 2013: synonym of Conus (Pseudopterygia) Tucker & Tenorio, 2013 represented as Conus Linnaeus, 1758
- Puncticulis Swainson, 1840: synonym of Conus (Puncticulis) Swainson, 1840 represented as Conus Linnaeus, 1758
- Purpuriconus da Motta, 1991: synonym of Conus (Dauciconus) Cotton, 1945 represented as Conus Linnaeus, 1758
- Pygmaeconus Puillandre & Tenorio, 2017
- Pyruconus Olsson, 1967: synonym of Conus (Pyruconus) Olsson, 1967 represented as Conus Linnaeus, 1758
- Quasiconus Tucker & Tenorio, 2009: synonym of Conus (Quasiconus) Tucker & Tenorio, 2009 represented as Conus Linnaeus, 1758
- Regiconus Iredale, 1930: synonym of Conus (Darioconus) Iredale, 1930 represented as Conus Linnaeus, 1758
- Rhizoconus Mörch, 1852: synonym of Conus (Rhizoconus) Mörch, 1852 represented as Conus Linnaeus, 1758
- Rhombiconus Tucker & Tenorio, 2009: synonym of Conus (Stephanoconus) Mörch, 1852 represented as Conus Linnaeus, 1758
- Rhombus Montfort, 1810: synonym of Rhombiconus Tucker & Tenorio, 2009, synonym of Conus (Stephanoconus) Mörch, 1852 represented as Conus Linnaeus, 1758
- Rolaniconus Tucker & Tenorio, 2009: synonym of Conus (Strategoconus) da Motta, 1991 represented as Conus Linnaeus, 1758
- Rollus Montfort, 1810 :synonym of Conus (Gastridium) Modeer, 1793 represented as Conus Linnaeus, 1758
- Rubroconus Tucker & Tenorio, 2013: synonym of Conus (Rubroconus) Tucker & Tenorio, 2013 represented as Conus Linnaeus, 1758
- Sandericonus Petuch, 2013: synonym of Conus (Sandericonus) Petuch, 2013 represented as Conus Linnaeus, 1758
- Sciteconus da Motta, 1991: synonym of Conus (Sciteconus) da Motta, 1991 represented as Conus Linnaeus, 1758
- Seminoleconus Petuch, 2003: synonym of Conus (Stephanoconus) Mörch, 1852 represented as Conus Linnaeus, 1758
- Socioconus da Motta, 1991: synonym of Conus (Pionoconus) Mörch, 1852 represented as Conus Linnaeus, 1758
- Splinoconus da Motta, 1991: synonym of Conus (Splinoconus) da Motta, 1991 represented as Conus Linnaeus, 1758
- Spuriconus Petuch, 2003: synonym of Conus (Lindaconus) Petuch, 2002 represented as Conus Linnaeus, 1758
- Stellaconus Tucker & Tenorio, 2009: synonym of Conus (Splinoconus) da Motta, 1991 represented as Conus Linnaeus, 1758
- Stephanoconus Mörch, 1852: synonym of Conus (Stephanoconus) Mörch, 1852 represented as Conus Linnaeus, 1758
- Strategoconus da Motta, 1991: synonym of Conus (Strategoconus) da Motta, 1991 represented as Conus Linnaeus, 1758
- Strioconus Thiele, 1929: synonym of Pionoconus Mörch, 1852, synonym of Conus (Pionoconus) Mörch, 1852 represented as Conus Linnaeus, 1758
- Sulciconus Bielz, 1869: synonym of Asprella Schaufuss, 1869, synonym of Conus (Asprella) Schaufuss, 1869 represented as Conus Linnaeus, 1758
- Taranteconus Azuma, 1972: synonym of Conus (Stephanoconus) Mörch, 1852 represented as Conus Linnaeus, 1758
- Tenorioconus Petuch & Drolshagen, 2011: synonym of Conus (Stephanoconus) Mörch, 1852 represented as Conus Linnaeus, 1758
- Tesselliconus da Motta, 1991: synonym of Conus (Tesselliconus) da Motta, 1991 represented as Conus Linnaeus, 1758
- Textilia Swainson, 1840: synonym of Conus (Textilia) Swainson, 1840 represented Conus Linnaeus, 1758
- Thalassiconus Tucker & Tenorio, 2013: synonym of Calibanus da Motta, 1991, synonym of Conus (Calibanus) da Motta, 1991 represented as Conus Linnaeus, 1758
- Theliconus Swainson, 1840: synonym of Hermes Montfort, 1810, synonym of Conus (Hermes) Montfort, 1810 represented as Conus Linnaeus, 1758
- Thoraconus da Motta, 1991: synonym of Fulgiconus da Motta, 1991, synonym of Conus (Phasmoconus) Mörch, 1852 represented as Conus Linnaeus, 1758
- Trovaoconus Tucker & Tenorio, 2009, synonym of Conus (Kalloconus) da Motta, 1991 represented as Conus Linnaeus, 1758
- Tuckericonus Petuch, 2013: synonym of Conus (Dauciconus) Cotton, 1945 represented as Conus Linnaeus, 1758
- Tuliparia Swainson, 1840: synonym of Gastridium Modeer, 1793, synonym of Conus (Gastridium) Modeer, 1793 represented as Conus Linnaeus, 1758
- Turriconus Shikama & Habe, 1968, synonym of Conus (Turriconus) Shikama & Habe, 1968 represented as Conus Linnaeus, 1758
- Utriculus Schumacher, 1817: synonym of Gastridium Modeer, 1793, synonym of Conus (Gastridium) Modeer, 1793 represented as Conus Linnaeus, 1758
- Varioconus da Motta, 1991: synonym of Conus (Lautoconus) Monterosato, 1923 represented as Conus Linnaeus, 1758
- Viminiconus Tucker & Tenorio, 2009: synonym of Conasprella (Fusiconus) da Motta, 1991 represented as Conasprella Thiele, 1929
- Virgiconus Cotton, 1945: synonym of Conus (Virgiconus) Cotton, 1945 represented as Conus Linnaeus, 1758
- Virroconus Iredale, 1930: synonym of Conus (Virroconus) Iredale, 1930 represented as Conus Linnaeus, 1758
- Vituliconus da Motta, 1991: synonym of Conus (Strategoconus) da Motta, 1991 represented as Conus Linnaeus, 1758
- Ximeniconus Emerson & Old, 1962: synonym of Conasprella (Ximeniconus) Emerson & Old, 1962 represented as Conasprella Thiele, 1929
- Yeddoconus Tucker & Tenorio, 2009: synonym of Conasprella (Endemoconus) Iredale, 1931 represented as Conasprella Thiele, 1929

=== 1993 to 2011 list of genera ===
Following Taylor et al., from 1993 to 2011, the family Conidae was defined as including not only the cone snails, but also a large number of other genera which are commonly known as "turrids". However, as a result of molecular phylogeny studies in 2011, many of those genera were moved back to the Turridae, or were placed in new "turrid" families within the superfamily Conoidea. The following list of genera that used to be included in Conidae is retained as a historical reference:

- Abyssobela Kantor & Sysoev, 1986
- Acamptodaphne Shuto, 1971
- Agathotoma Cossman, 1899
- Aliceia Dautzenberg & Fischer, 1897
- Antimitra Iredale, 1917
- Asperdaphne Hedley, 1922
- Asprella (considered a synonym of Conus by some authors)
- Austrodaphnella Laseron, 1954
- Bactrocythara Woodring, 1928
- Bathybela Kobelt, 1905
- Bathytoma Harris & Burrows 1891
- Bela Gray, 1847
- Belaturricula Powell, 1951
- Benthomangelia Thiele, 1925
- Borsonella Dall, 1908
- Brachycythara Woodring, 1928
- Buccinaria Kittl, 1887
- Cenodagreutes E.H. Smith, 1967
- Chelyconus (synonym of Conus)
- Clathromangelia Monterosato, 1884
- Clathurella Carpenter, 1857
- Cleobula (synonym of Conus)
- Clinura Bellardi, 1875
- Clinuropsis Vincent, 1913
- Columbarium Martens, 1881
- Conasprella (considered a synonym of Conus by some authors)
- Conopleura Hinds, 1844
- Conorbis Swainson, 1840
- Conospirus Gregorio, 1890
- Conus Linnaeus, 1758
- Crockerella Hertlein & Strong 1951
- Cryoturris Woodring, 1928
- Cryptodaphne Powell, 1942
- Curtitoma Bartsch, 1941
- Daphnella Hinds 1844
- Daphnellopsis Schepman, 1913
- Darioconus (considered a synonym of Conus by some authors)
- Dauciconus (considered a synonym of Conus by some authors)
- Dendroconus (considered a synonym of Conus by some authors)
- Diaugasma Melvill, 1917
- Drilliola Locard, 1897
- Endemoconus (considered a synonym of Conus by some authors)
- Eubela Dall, 1889
- Eucyclotoma Boettger, 1895
- Euryentmema Woodring, 1928
- Exomilus Hedley, 1918
- Fehria van Aartsen, 1988
- Fusidaphne Laseron, 1954
- Gastridium (considered a synonym of Conus by some authors)
- Glyphostoma Gabb, 1872
- Glyphostomops Bartsch, 1934
- Glyphoturris Woodring, 1928
- Glyptaesopus Pilsbry & Olsson 1941
- Granoturris Fargo, 1953
- Gymnobela Verrill, 1884
- Isodaphne Laseron, 1954
- Ithycythara Woodring, 1928
- Jaspidiconus Clench, 1942
- Kermia Oliver, 1915
- Kuroshiodaphne Shuto, 1965
- Kurtzia Bartsch, 1944
- Kurtziella Dall, 1918
- Leufroyia Monterosato 1884
- Lithoconus (considered a synonym of Conus by some authors)
- Mangelia Risso, 1826
- Microdaphne McLean, 1971
- Microgenia Laseron, 1954
- Mioawateria Vella, 1954
- Mitramorpha Adams, 1865
- Mitrolumna Bucquoy, Dautzenberg & Dollfus 1883
- Mitromorpha Adams, 1865
- Nannodiella Dall, 1918
- Neopleurotomoides Shuto, 1971
- Nepotilla Hedley, 1918
- Nipponaphera Habe, 1961
- Obesotoma Bartsch, 1941
- Oenopota Mörch, 1852
- Ophiodermella Bartsch, 1944
- Pagodidaphne Shuto, 1983
- Perplicaria Dall, 1890
- Phymorhynchus Dall, 1908
- Platycythara Woodring, 1928
- Pleurotomella verrill, 1873
- Pontiothauma E.A. Smith, 1895
- Propebela Iredale, 1918
- Pseudodaphnella Boettger, 1895
- Puncticulis Swainson, 1840
- Pyrgocythara Woodring, 1928
- Raphitoma Bellardi, 1847
- Rhizoconus (considered a synonym of Conus by some authors)
- Rimosodaphnella Cossmann, 1915
- Rocroithys Sysoev & Bouchet, 2001
- Rubellatoma Bartsch & Rehder 1939
- Rugobela Finlay, 1924
- Scalptia Jousseaume 1887
- Spergo Dall, 1895
- Stephanoconus (considered a synonym of Conus by some authors)
- Stilla Finlay, 1926
- Suavodrillia Dall, 1918
- Taranidaphne Morassi & Bonfitto, 2001
- Taranis Jeffreys, 1870
- Tasmadaphne Laseron, 1954
- Teleochilus Harris, 1897
- Tenaturris Woodring, 1928
- Teretia Norman, 1888
- Teretiopsis Kantor & Sysoev, 1989
- Thatcheria Angas, 1877
- Thatcheriasyrinx Powell, 1969
- Thatcherina Vera-Pelaez, 1998
- Thelecythara Woodring, 1928
- Thesbia Jeffreys, 1867
- Theta A.H. Clarke, 1959
- Tritonoturris Dall, 1924
- Truncadaphne McLean, 1971
- Tuskaroria Sysoev, 1988
- Typhlodaphne Powell, 1951
- Typhlomangelia Sars G.O., 1878
- Veprecula Melvill, 1917
- Vepridaphne Shuto, 1983
- Virgiconus (considered a synonym of Conus by some authors)
- Virroconus (considered a synonym of Conus by some authors)
- Xanthodaphne Powell, 1942
- Zenepos Finlay, 1928
- Zierliana Gray, 1847

== See also ==
- ConoServer, a database of cone snail toxins, known as conopeptides. These toxins are of importance to medical research.
- Conotoxin
