= Taxonomy of the Conoidea (Tucker & Tenorio, 2009) =

Classification of cone snails and allies

The taxonomy of the cone snails and their allies as proposed by John K. Tucker and Manuel J. Tenorio in 2009 was a biological classification system for a large group of predatory sea snails. This system was an attempt to make taxonomic sense of the large and diverse group which contains the family Conidae, the cone snails. The authors proposed extensive changes to the family Conidae in contrast to the way the group was treated in the taxonomy of the Gastropoda by Bouchet & Rocroi, 2005. Bouchet and Rocroi included in the family Conidae several other groups of toxoglossan snails which had previously been placed in the Turridae.

For the over 600 recognized species of living cone snails, Tucker and Tenorio's classification system proposed 3 distinct families and 82 genera. The authors discussed in detail 89 genera and five families in total (that have the inner shell walls resorbed during growth), including fossil cone snail genera and snails which were previously traditionally classified as turrids. This classification was based upon shell morphology, radular differences, anatomy, physiology, cladistics, and an analysis of then published molecular phylogeny (DNA) studies. The genera proposed by Tucker and Tenorio are recognized as an "alternate representation" by the World Register of Marine Species. The authors further proposed a modification to the classification of Bouchet & Rocroi (2005) for ten additional Conoidea families (which do not resorb their inner walls) which included turrids which had been placed in the Conidae by Taylor, et al. in 1993. This proposed taxonomic classification separated the turrid snails from the cone snails, which were considered to be a distinct and diverse group.

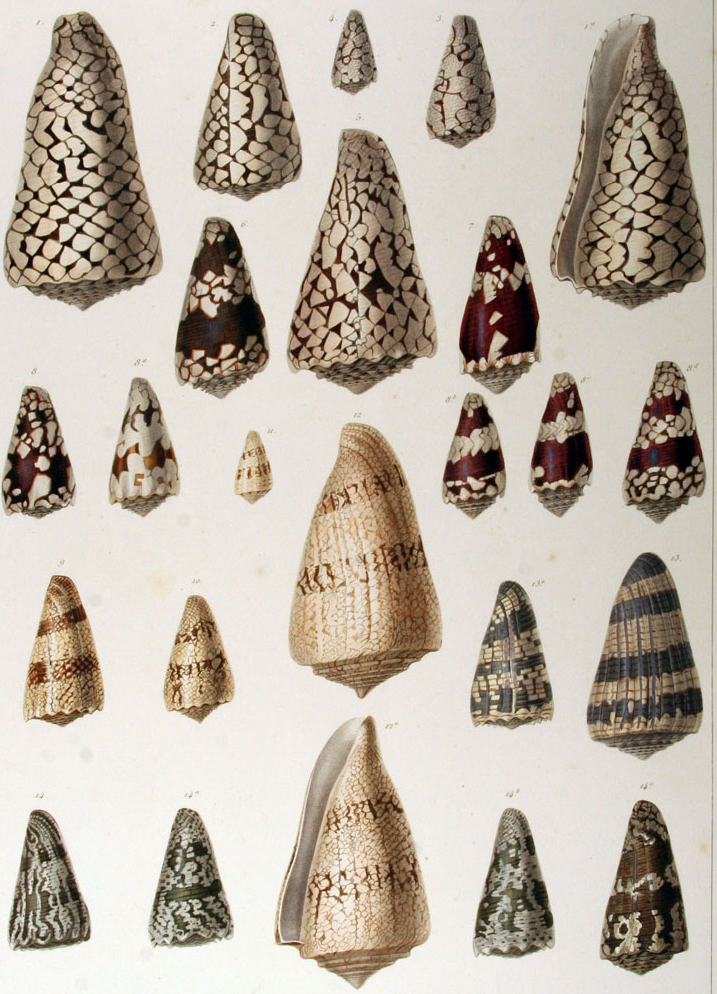
Illustrated plate of the shells of some cone snails from J.C. Chenu (1842) Illustrations Conchyliologiques

== Cone snails and the genus problem ==
In 1758, Linnaeus, working only with shells, placed all the cone snails in a single genus Conus. In 1792, three genera were proposed by Hwass, five genera were proposed by Montfort in 1810, and then six genera by Kiener in 1845. In 1874, H.C. Weinkauff proposed a system of seventeen genera for the 352 then-known species of cones. This system of classification was adopted by G. W. Tryon in 1884.

In the 1930s, Iredale proposed several new genera, followed by B. C. Cotton in 1945, with twenty-nine genera. From 1956 onwards, Kuroda and other Japanese scientists introduced several additional new genera. Ultimately dozens of genera and subgenera were being used.

In 1937, J.R. Tomlin advocated that all cone snail species should be placed in the single genus Conus in the family Conidae, with the explanation that "the grouping of the Cones is as yet so little understood that I have made no attempt to deal with the growing number of subgenera and genera into which Conus has been dismembered." In 1979, Jerry G. Walls emulated Tomlin by confining all species to the genus Conus, stating that "although many subgenera or genera have been devised for the cones, only the single genus Conus with no subgenera is recognized here." Subsequent experts in the field of cone snail taxonomy followed Tomlin and Walls, and retained all species of cones in the single genus Conus, making the Conidae a monogeneric family. This traditional Linnaean classification system, placing all species of cones in the single genus Conus, continued for decades before a malacologist proposed a different classification system.

In 1991, A.J. da Motta published a new systematic classification of cone species at the generic level, incorporating all taxa previously named by other authors. A.J. da Motta's classification system, which covered both extant and fossil species, was based primarily on the shape and contours of the body whorl of the shell, and attempted to make generic classification of cones possible in an objective manner. This 1991 proposed classification used eight existing genera, Conus, Leptoconus, Dendroconus, Hermes, Profundiconus, Gastridium, Conasprella, and Cylinder, and sixty subgenera. A.J. da Motta's proposed classification was however not generally accepted.

The last comprehensive treatise dealing with the family Conidae as a whole was the "Manual of the Living Conidae", by Röckel, Korn & Kohn (1995). Only one genus, Conus, was used for the entire family, the authors stating that they considered there was still insufficient scientific data at that time to accurately define the diversity of the family. The Conus Biodiversity Website, by Alan J. Kohn and Trevor Anderson, notes that there are more than 500 recognized extant species of Conus, out of 3,253 species names published between 1758 and 2007. As of the date of The Conus Biodiversity Website's last update in October 2007, only the genus Conus is recognized for the entire family.

== Modern taxonomic classifications ==
Molecular testing in order to try to understand the molecular phylogeny of the Conidae was initially begun by Christopher Meyer and Alan Kohn in 2005, and is continuing, particularly with the advent of nuclear DNA testing in addition to mDNA testing. In modern taxonomic classifications, cladistical analyses are performed using traditionally accepted taxonomic characteristics, including morphology (shell shape has been used for over 250 years as the basis for classification), and modern techniques including DNA analyses. Such studies have been conducted on many groups of gastropods, including cone snails prior to the publication of Tucker and Tenorio's treatise.

== Tucker and Tenorio’s 2009 proposed classification ==
Tucker and Tenorio's 2009 classification system for the cone shells and their allies (which resorb their inner walls during growth) was based on a cladistical analysis of anatomical characters, including the radular tooth, the morphology (i.e. shell characters), as well as an analysis of prior molecular phylogeny studies, all of which were used to construct phylogenetic trees. In their phylogeny, Tucker and Tenorio noted the close relationship of the cone species within the various clades, corresponding to their proposed families and genera; this also corresponded to the results of prior molecular studies by Puillandre et al. and others.

Tucker and Tenorio's proposed classification system for the cone shells and their allies is shown below (note that genera that contain only fossil species are marked with †):

=== Family: Conidae Fleming, 1822 ===
Subfamily Coninae Fleming, 1822

- Calibanus da Motta, 1991
- Chelyconus Mörch, 1852
- Conus Linnaeus, 1758
- Cylinder Montfort, 1810
- Darioconus Iredale, 1930
- Endemoconus Iredale, 1931
- Eugeniconus da Motta, 1991
- Gastridium Modeer, 1793
- Leptoconus Swainson, 1840
- Nataliconus Tucker & Tenorio, 2009
- Phasmoconus Mörch, 1852
- Pionoconus Mörch, 1852
- Protostrioconus Tucker & Tenorio, 2009
- Pseudolilliconus Tucker & Tenorio, 2009
- Textilia Swainson, 1840

Subfamily Puncticuliinae Tucker & Tenorio, 2009

- Africonus Petuch, 1975
- Asprella Schaufuss, 1869
- Austroconus Tucker & Tenorio, 2009
- Calamiconus Tucker & Tenorio, 2009
- Conasprelloides Tucker & Tenorio, 2009
- Dauciconus Cotton, 1945
- Dendroconus Swainson, 1840
- Ductoconus da Motta, 1991
- Dyraspis Iredale, 1949
- Eremiconus Tucker & Tenorio, 2009
- Floraconus Iredale, 1930
- Fulgiconus da Motta, 1991
- Genuanoconus Tucker & Tenorio, 2009,
- Gladioconus Tucker & Tenorio, 2009,
- Gradiconus da Motta, 1991
- Harmoniconus da Motta, 1991
- Hermes Montfort, 1810
- Kalloconus da Motta, 1991
- Ketyconus da Motta, 1991
- Kioconus da Motta, 1991
- Kurodaconus Shikama & Habe, 1968
- Lamniconus da Motta, 1991
- Lautoconus Monterosato, 1923
- Leporiconus Iredale, 1930
- Lindaconus Petuch, 2003
- Lithoconus Mörch, 1852
- Lividoconus Wils, 1970
- Miliariconus Tucker & Tenorio, 2009
- Monteiroconus da Motta, 1991
- † Plagioconus Tucker & Tenorio, 2009
- Plicaustraconus Moolenbeek, 2008
- Protoconus da Motta, 1991
- Pseudonoduloconus Tucker & Tenorio, 2009
- Puncticulis Swainson, 1840
- Purpuriconus da Motta, 1991
- Pyruconus Olsson, 1967
- Rhizoconus Mörch, 1852
- Rhombiconus Tucker & Tenorio, 2009
- Rolaniconus Tucker & Tenorio, 2009
- Sciteconus da Motta, 1991
- Spuriconus Petuch, 2003
- Stellaconus Tucker & Tenorio, 2009
- Stephanoconus Mörch, 1852
- Strategoconus da Motta, 1991
- Tenorioconus Petuch & Drolshagen, 2011
- Trovaoconus Tucker & Tenorio, 2009
- Turriconus Shikama & Habe, 1968
- Varioconus da Motta, 1991
- Virgiconus Cotton, 1945
- Virroconus Iredale, 1930
- Vituliconus da Motta, 1991

=== Family: Conorbidae Powell, 1842 ===
(Traditionally considered to be turrids)

- Artemidiconus da Motta, 1991
- Benthofascis Iredale, 1936
- † Conorbis Swainson, 1840

=== Family: Conilithidae Tucker & Tenorio, 2009 ===
Subfamily Conilithinae Tucker & Tenorio, 2009

- Bathyconus Tucker & Tenorio, 2009
- Conasprella Thiele, 1929
- † Conilithes Swainson, 1840
- Dalliconus Tucker & Tenorio, 2009
- † Eoconus Tucker & Tenorio, 2009
- Fusiconus da Motta, 1991
- Globiconus Tucker & Tenorio, 2009
- Jaspidiconus Petuch, 2003
- Kohniconus Tucker & Tenorio, 2009
- Lilliconus Raybaudi Massilia, 1994
- Parviconus Cotton & Godfrey, 1932
- Perplexiconus Tucker & Tenorio, 2009
- Profundiconus Kuroda, 1956
- Pseudoconorbis Tucker & Tenorio, 2009
- Quasiconus Tucker & Tenorio, 2009
- Viminiconus Tucker & Tenorio, 2009
- Ximeniconus Emerson & Old, 1962
- Yeddoconus Tucker & Tenorio, 2009

Subfamily Californiconinae Tucker & Tenorio, 2009

- Californiconus Tucker & Tenorio, 2009

=== Family: Hemiconidae Tucker & Tenorio, 2009 ===
- † Hemiconus Cossman, 1889

=== Family: Taranteconidae Tucker & Tenorio, 2009 ===
- Taranteconus Azuma, 1972
- Kenyonia Brazier, 1896

== Proposed taxonomy of other Conoidean gastropods ==
Tucker and Tenorio's proposed classification system for the other clades of Conoidean gastropods (that do not resorb their inner walls), is also based upon morphological, anatomical, and molecular studies, and is shown below:

=== Superfamily Conoidea Fleming, 1822 ===
(Species in these families lack a radular membrane)

- Family Cryptoconidae Cossman, 1896
- Family Borsoniidae Bellardi, 1875
- Family Raphitomidae Bellardi, 1875
  - Subfamily Raphitominae Bellardi, 1875
  - Subfamily Mangeliinae P. Fischer, 1883
- Family Clathurellidae H. & A. Adams, 1858
  - Subfamily Clathurellinae H. & A. Adams, 1858
  - Subfamily Mitromorphinae Casey, 1904

=== Superfamily Turroidea Swainson, 1840 ===
(Species in these families have a radular membrane and correspond to Puillandre et al.'s "clade B".)

- Family Clavatulidae J.E. Gray, 1853
- Family Drilliidae Olsson, 1964
- Family Pseudomelatomidae J.P.E. Morrison, 1965
- Family Strictispiridae McLean, 1971
- Family Terebridae H. & A. Adams, 1854 (some species lack a radular membrane)
- Family Turridae H.& A. Adams, 1858
  - Subfamily Turrinae H. & A. Adams, 1858
  - Subfamily Cochlespirinae Powell, 1942
  - Subfamily Crassispirinae McLean, 1971
  - Subfamily Zemaciinae Sysoev in Medinskaya & Sysoev, 2003
  - Subfamily Zonulispirinae McLean, 1971

== Subsequent molecular studies and taxonomic changes ==
The family Taranteconidae was proposed by Tucker and Tenorio for the unusual species Taranteconus chiangi Azuma, 1972 (equivalent to Conus chiangi), based upon their cladistical analysis. In 2010, a molecular phylogeny conducted by M. Watkins, et al. found that, based upon molecular studies, Conus chiangi (Azuma, 1972) falls within the Stephanoconus clade with 100% certainty. Further, Conus chiangi has peptide toxins that are virtually identical to those of the other Stephanoconus species. The authors opined that the specific peptide toxins were the result of strong natural selection in prey choice, as all Stephanoconus species prey on amphinomid polychaetes (also known as "fire worms").

In their 2009 treatise, John K. Tucker and Manuel J. Tenorio elevated the subfamily Conorbiinae (previously placed within the family Conidae) to the rank of family, based upon a cladistical analysis (as discussed above) which was used to construct phylogenetic trees. Shortly thereafter, in 2011, Bouchet et al. confirmed the elevation of the subfamily Conorbiinae to the family Conorbidae, based upon a detailed molecular phylogeny of a dataset of molecular sequences (of three gene (DNA) fragments), an analysis that was conducted across the superfamily Conoidea. Bouchet et al., further recognized Tucker & Tenorio's proposed modified classification, removing many turrid genera from the traditional cone snails, creating the following Conoidean gastropod families: Borsoniidae (which includes Tucker & Tenorio's family Cryptoconidae), Raphitomidae, Mangeliidae, Mitromorphidae, and Clathurellidae. These studies effectively removed these turrid genera from the family which traditionally represented the cone snails.

== Significance of "alternative representations" ==
As previously mentioned, prior to 2009, all species within the family Conidae were placed in one genus, Conus. In 2009, J.K. Tucker and M.J. Tenorio proposed a classification system for the over 600 recognized species in the family: 3 distinct families and 82 genera for the living species of cone snails. This classification was based upon shell morphology, radular differences, anatomy, physiology, cladistics, with comparisons to molecular (DNA) studies. Published accounts using these multiple genera to explain the diversity within the Conidae include J.K. Tucker & M.J. Tenorio (2009), and Bouchet et al. (2011). Recent published accounts of the proposed family Conilithidae and its genera include: Tucker & Stahlschmidt (2010), Tucker, Tenorio & Stahlschmidt (2011), Bouchet et al. (2011), Puillandre et al. (2011), Tucker & Tenorio (2011), Petuch & Sargent (2011), and Petuch & Drolshage (2011).

However, in 2011, some experts still preferred to use the traditional classification, where all species are placed in Conus within the single family Conidae. For example, the November 2011 version of the World Register of Marine Species (WoRMS) used this system. The binomial names of species in the 82 living cone snail genera listed in Tucker & Tenorio 2009 were nonetheless recognized by WoRMS as "alternative representations." Debate within the scientific community regarding this issue continued, and additional molecular phylogeny studies were carried out in an attempt to clarify the issue.

== See also ==
- Taxonomy of the Gastropoda (Bouchet et al., 2017)
- Taxonomy of the Gastropoda (Bouchet & Rocroi, 2005) – System for the scientific classification of gastropod mollusks
- Taxonomy of the Gastropoda (Ponder & Lindberg, 1997) – Morphological system for the scientific classification of gastropod mollusks
- 2010 Bivalvia taxonomy
