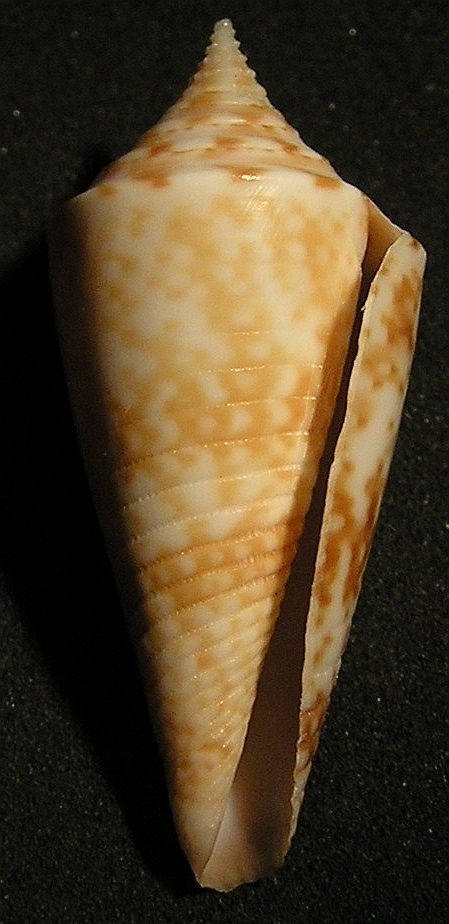
- Apertural view of shell of Conus lemniscatus (Reeve, 1849).

Scientific classification
- Kingdom: Animalia
- Phylum: Mollusca
- Class: Gastropoda
- Subclass: Caenogastropoda
- Order: Neogastropoda
- Family: Conidae
- Genus: Conus
- Subgenus: Lamniconus da Motta, 1991

Type species
- Conus clerii Reeve, 1844

Synonyms
- Lamniconus da Motta, 1991

= Conus (Lamniconus) =

Subgenus of gastropods

Lamniconus is a subgenus of sea snails, marine gastropod molluscs in the family Conidae, the cone snails and their allies.

In the latest classification of the family Conidae by Puillandre N., Duda T.F., Meyer C., Olivera B.M. & Bouchet P. (2015), Lamniconus has become a subgenus of Conus as Conus (Lamniconus) da Motta, 1991 (type species: Conus cleerii Reeve, 1844) represented as Conus Linnaeus, 1758

== Distinguishing characteristics ==
The Tucker & Tenorio 2009 taxonomy distinguishes Lamniconus from Conus in the following ways:

- Genus Conus sensu stricto Linnaeus, 1758

Shell characters (living and fossil species)

The basic shell shape is conical to elongated conical, has a deep anal notch on the shoulder, a smooth periostracum and a small operculum. The shoulder of the shell is usually nodulose and the protoconch is usually multispiral. Markings often include the presence of tents except for black or white color variants, with the absence of spiral lines of minute tents and textile bars.

Radular tooth (not known for fossil species)

The radula has an elongated anterior section with serrations and a large exposed terminating cusp, a non-obvious waist, blade is either small or absent and has a short barb, and lacks a basal spur.

Geographical distribution

These species are found in the Indo-Pacific region.

Feeding habits

These species eat other gastropods including cones.

- Subgenus Lamniconus da Motta, 1991

Shell characters (living and fossil species)

The shell is turbinate to elongate conical in shape. The protoconch is paucispiral. The spire is scalariform and concave in cross section. The shell is ornamented with cords and nodules which die out early in the postnuclear whorls. The anal notch is deep. The periostracum is tufted, and the operculum is small.

Radular tooth (not known for fossil species)

The anterior section of the radular tooth is roughly equal in length with the posterior section, the blade is long and covers most of the anterior section. A basal spur is present, and the barb is short. The radular tooth has serrations, and an internal terminating cusp.

Geographical distribution

The species in this genus occur in the occur in the West Atlantic region.

Feeding habits

These cone snails are presumed to be vermivorous, meaning that the cones prey on polychaete worms, based upon the radular tooth morphology.

== Species list ==
This list of species is based on the information in the World Register of Marine Species (WoRMS) list. Species within the genus Lamniconus include:

- Lamniconus carcellesi (Martins, 1945): synonym of Conus (Lamniconus) carcellesi Martins, 1945 represented as Conus carcellesi Martins, 1945
- Lamniconus clerii (Reeve, 1844) : synonym of Conus clerii Reeve, 1844
- Lamniconus lemniscatus (Reeve, 1849) : synonym of Conus lemniscatus Reeve, 1849
- Lamniconus patriceae Petuch & R. F. Myers, 2014: synonym of Conus patriceae (Petuch & R. F. Myers, 2014)
- Lamniconus tostesi (Petuch, 1986): synonym of Conus (Lamniconus) tostesi Petuch, 1986 represented as Conus tostesi Petuch, 1986
- Lamniconus xanthocinctus (Petuch, 1986) : synonym of Conus xanthocinctus Petuch, 1986
