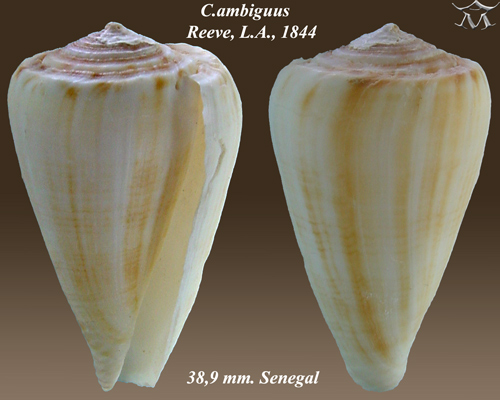
- Apertural view of shell of Conus ambiguus (Reeve, 1844) collected off the coast of Senegal.

Scientific classification
- Kingdom: Animalia
- Phylum: Mollusca
- Class: Gastropoda
- Subclass: Caenogastropoda
- Order: Neogastropoda
- Family: Conidae
- Genus: Conus
- Subgenus: Monteiroconus da Motta, 1991

Type species
- Conus ambiguus Reeve, 1844

Synonyms
- Monteiroconus da Motta, 1991; Gladioconus Tucker & Tenorio, 2009

= Conus (Monteiroconus) =

Subgenus of gastropods

Monteiroconus is a subgenus of sea snails, marine gastropod molluscs in the genus Conus, family Conidae, the cone snails and their allies.

In the latest classification of the family Conidae by Puillandre N., Duda T.F., Meyer C., Olivera B.M. & Bouchet P. (2015), Monteiroconus has become a subgenus of Conus as Conus (Monteiroconus) da Motta, 1991 (type species Conus ambiguus Reeve, 1844) represented as Conus Linnaeus, 1758

== Distinguishing characteristics ==
The Tucker & Tenorio 2009 taxonomy distinguishes Monteiroconus from Conus in the following ways:

- Genus Conus sensu stricto Linnaeus, 1758

Shell characters (living and fossil species)

The basic shell shape is conical to elongated conical, has a deep anal notch on the shoulder, a smooth periostracum and a small operculum. The shoulder of the shell is usually nodulose and the protoconch is usually multispiral. Markings often include the presence of tents except for black or white color variants, with the absence of spiral lines of minute tents and textile bars.

Radular tooth (not known for fossil species)

The radula has an elongated anterior section with serrations and a large exposed terminating cusp, a non-obvious waist, blade is either small or absent and has a short barb, and lacks a basal spur.

Geographical distribution

These species are found in the Indo-Pacific region.

Feeding habits

These species eat other gastropods including cones.

- Subgenus Monteiroconus da Motta, 1991

Shell characters (living and fossil species)

The shell is obconic in shape. The spire is usually convex in profile, the protoconch is multispiral. The whorl tops are concave when viewed in cross section, and cords may be present or absent. The anal notch is shallow to moderately deep. The species in this genus have a unique periostracum which is thick and often scaly. The operculum is small.

Radular tooth (not known for fossil species)

The anterior section and the posterior section of the radular tooth are about equal in length, and the blade is long and covers about 75% of the length of the anterior section. A basal spur is present, and the barb is short. Serrations are coarse and are usually in a single row.

Geographical distribution

The species in this genus occur in the West African and European regions.

Feeding habits

These cone snails are vermivorous, meaning that the cones prey on polychaete worms.

== Species list ==
This list of species is based on the information in the World Register of Marine Species (WoRMS) list. Species within the genus Monteiroconus include:

- Monteiroconus ambiguus (Reeve, 1844) is equivalent to Conus ambiguus Reeve, 1844
- Monteiroconus bellocqae (van Rossum, 1996) is equivalent to Conus bellocqae van Rossum, 1996
- Monteiroconus tabidus (Reeve, 1844) is equivalent to Conus tabidus Reeve, 1844
