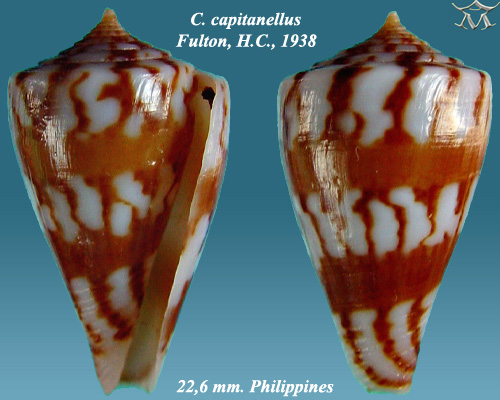
- Apertural and abapertural views of shell of Conus capitanellus (H.C. Fulton, 1938)

Scientific classification
- Kingdom: Animalia
- Phylum: Mollusca
- Class: Gastropoda
- (unranked): clade Caenogastropoda clade Hypsogastropoda clade Neogastropoda
- Superfamily: Conoidea
- Family: Conidae
- Genus: Stellaconus Tucker & Tenorio, 2009

Synonyms
- Conus (Splinoconus) da Motta, 1991

= Stellaconus =

Genus of gastropods

Stellaconus is a synonym of Conus (Splinoconus) da Motta, 1991: synonym of Conus Linnaeus, 1758. These are sea snails, marine gastropod mollusks in the family Conidae, the cone snails and their allies.

== Species ==
The following species are alternate representation:

- Stellaconus bayani (Jousseaume, 1872): synonym of Conus bayani Jousseaume, 1872 (alternate representation)
- Stellaconus bondarevi (Röckel & G. Raybaudi Massilia, 1992): synonym of Conus bondarevi Röckel & G. Raybaudi Massilia, 1992 (alternate representation)
- Stellaconus capitanellus (Fulton, 1938): synonym of Conus capitanellus Fulton, 1938 (alternate representation)
- Stellaconus malacanus (Hwass in Bruguière, 1792): synonym of Conus malacanus Hwass in Bruguière, 1792 (alternate representation)
- Stellaconus sukhadwalai (Röckel & da Motta, 1983): synonym of Conus sukhadwalai Röckel & da Motta, 1983 (alternate representation)
- Stellaconus troendlei (Moolenbeek, Zandbergen & Bouchet, 2008): synonym of Conus troendlei Moolenbeek, Zandbergen & Bouchet, 2008 (alternate representation)
