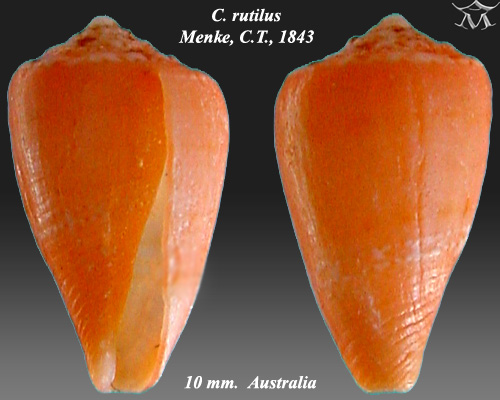
- Apertural and abapertural views of shell of Conasprella rutila Menke, C.T., 1843

Scientific classification
- Kingdom: Animalia
- Phylum: Mollusca
- Class: Gastropoda
- Subclass: Caenogastropoda
- Order: Neogastropoda
- Family: Conidae
- Genus: Conasprella
- Subgenus: Parviconus; Cotton & Godfrey, 1932

Synonyms
- Parviconus Cotton & Godfrey, 1932

= Conasprella (Parviconus) =

Subgenus of gastropods

Parviconus is a subgenus of sea snails, marine gastropod mollusks in the genus Conasprella, family Conidae, the cone snails and their allies. This genus currently (November 2011) is still treated by some experts as an "alternative representation" of this group of species.

In the new classification of the family Conidae by Puillandre N., Duda T.F., Meyer C., Olivera B.M. & Bouchet P. (2015), Kohniconus has become a subgenus of Conasprella: Conasprella (Kohniconus) Tucker & Tenorio, 2009 represented as Conasprella Thiele, 1929

== Distinguishing characteristics ==
The Tucker & Tenorio 2009 taxonomy distinguishes Parviconus from Conus in the following ways:

- Genus Conus sensu stricto Linnaeus, 1758

Shell characters (living and fossil species)

The basic shell shape is conical to elongated conical, has a deep anal notch on the shoulder, a smooth periostracum and a small operculum. The shoulder of the shell is usually nodulose and the protoconch is usually multispiral. Markings often include the presence of tents except for black or white color variants, with the absence of spiral lines of minute tents and textile bars.

Radular tooth (not known for fossil species)

The radula has an elongated anterior section with serrations and a large exposed terminating cusp, a non-obvious waist, blade is either small or absent and has a short barb, and lacks a basal spur.

Geographical distribution

These species are found in the Indo-Pacific region.

Feeding habits

These species eat other gastropods including cones.

- Subgenus Parviconus Cotton & Godfrey, 1932

Shell characters (living and fossil species)

The shell is small, turbinate in shape with parallel sides contracting towards the base. The protoconch is paucispiral. The spire is scalariform, with concave whorl tops which do not have cords. A dentiform plait is present. The anal notch is shallow, and an anterior notch is absent. The shell may be ornamented with nodules that persist. The details of the periostracum and operculum are unknown.

Radular tooth (not known for fossil species)

The anterior section of the radular tooth is shorter than the posterior section, and has a well-developed blade and posterior blade that covers most of the anterior section. There is a blunt shaft fold. A basal spur is present, and the barb is short.

Geographical distribution

The only known species in this genus occurs in the Australian region.

Feeding habits

These cone snails are presumed to be vermivorous, meaning that they prey on polychaete worms, based upon the radular tooth morphology.

== Species list ==
This list of species is based on the information in the World Register of Marine Species (WoRMS) list. Species within the genus Parviconus include:

- Parviconus rutilus (Menke, 1843) is synonym of Conasprella rutila (Menke, 1843)

== Significance of "alternative representation" ==
Prior to 2009, all cone species were placed within the family Conidae and were placed in one genus, Conus. In 2009 however, J.K. Tucker and M.J. Tenorio proposed a classification system for the over 600 recognized species that were in the family. Their classification proposed 3 distinct families and 82 genera for the living species of cone snails, including the family Conilithidae. This classification was based upon shell morphology, radular differences, anatomy, physiology, cladistics, with comparisons to molecular (DNA) studies. Published accounts of genera within the Conidae (or Conilithidae) that include the genus Parviconus include J.K. Tucker & M.J. Tenorio (2009), and Bouchet et al. (2011).

Testing in order to try to understand the molecular phylogeny of the Conidae was initially begun by Christopher Meyer and Alan Kohn, and is continuing, particularly with the advent of nuclear DNA testing in addition to mDNA testing.

However, in 2011, some experts still use the traditional classification, where all species are placed in Conus within the single family Conidae: for example, according to the current November 2011 version of the World Register of Marine Species, all species within the family Conidae are in the genus Conus. The binomial names of species in the 82 cone snail genera listed in Tucker & Tenorio 2009 are recognized by the World Register of Marine Species as "alternative representations." Debate within the scientific community regarding continues, and additional molecular phylogeny studies are being carried out in an attempt to clarify the issue.

All this has been superseded in 2015 by the new classification of the Conidae
