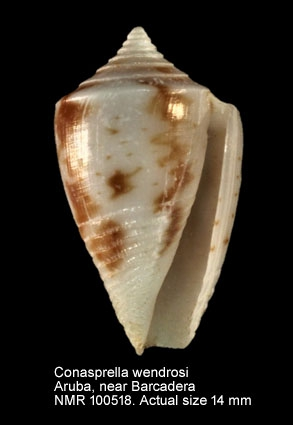
- The shell of Conasprella Wendrosi

Scientific classification
- Kingdom: Animalia
- Phylum: Mollusca
- Class: Gastropoda
- Subclass: Caenogastropoda
- Order: Neogastropoda
- Superfamily: Conoidea
- Family: Conidae
- Genus: Conasprella
- Species: C. wendrosi

Binomial name
- Conasprella wendrosi (Tenorio & Afonso, 2013)

Synonyms
- Conasprella (Ximenoconus) wendrosi (Tenorio & Afonso, 2013) - accepted, alternate representation; Conus wendrosi (Tenorio & Afonso, 2013); Perplexiconus wendrosi Tenorio & Afonso, 2013 (original combination); Ximeniconus (Perplexiconus) wendrosi (Tenorio & Afonso, 2013)

= Conasprella wendrosi =

Species of gastropod

Conasprella wendrosi is a species of sea snail, a marine gastropod mollusk in the family Conidae, the cone snails and their allies.

Like all species within the genus Conasprella, these cone snails are predatory and venomous. They are capable of stinging humans, therefore live ones should be handled carefully or not at all.

== Description ==
The shell is conical in shape and has a length that varies between 10 and 17 mm. Like all species within the genus Conasprella, these cone snails are predatory and venomous. They are capable of stinging humans, which is why caution should be exercised or they should be avoided altogether when handling live snails.

Their functional type is Benthos.

== Distribution ==
This species occurs in the Caribbean Sea near Aruba; so far, the only known location is the sandbank adjacent to a mangrove swamp off the coast of Barcadera. In Aruba, Conasprella wendrosi is one of the three endemic species of snails, alongside Conus curassaviensis and Conus hieroglyphus.
