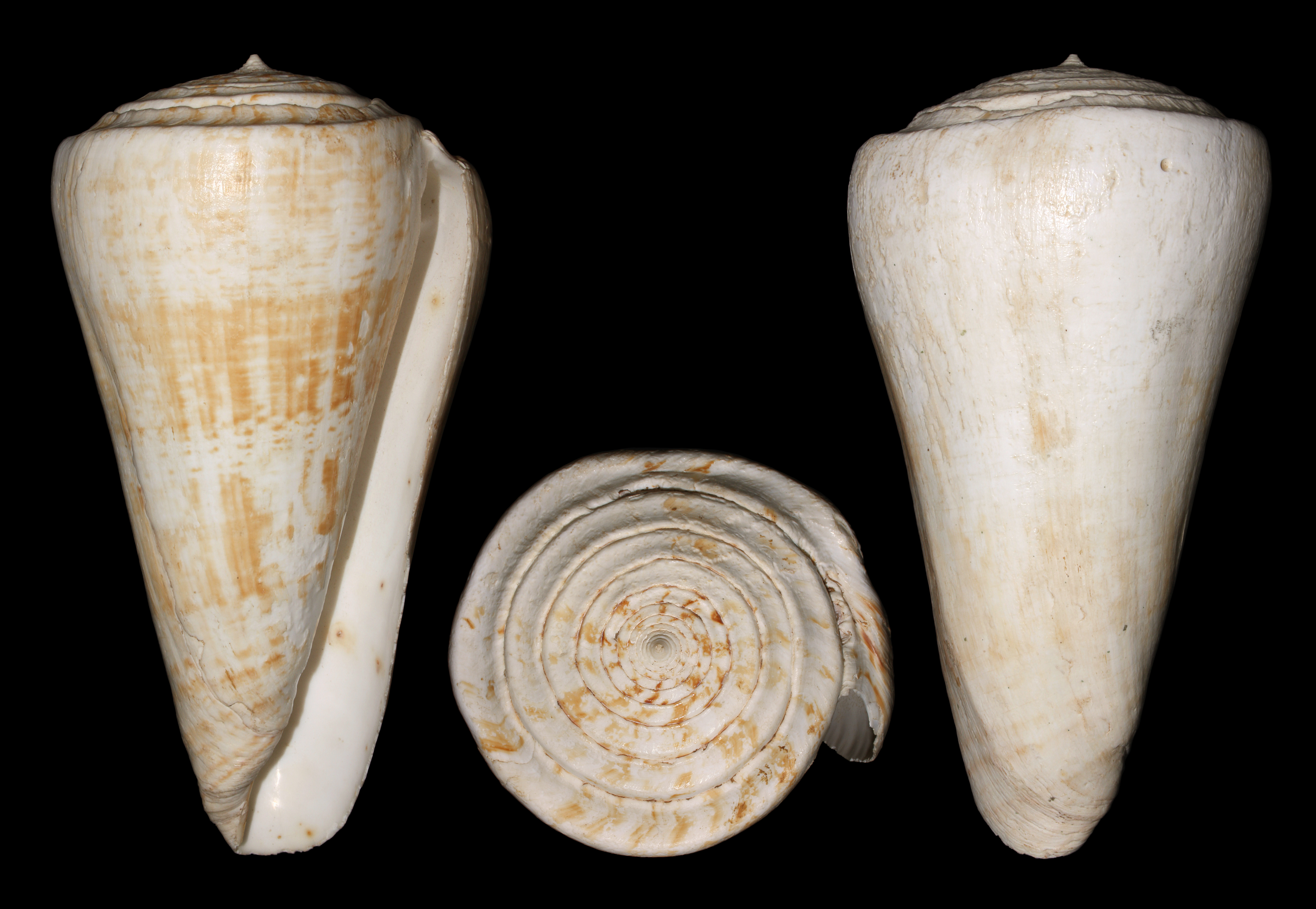
- Apertural view of shell of Conus pulcher (Lightfoot, 1786), collected at Banjul, Gambia

Scientific classification
- Kingdom: Animalia
- Phylum: Mollusca
- Class: Gastropoda
- Subclass: Caenogastropoda
- Order: Neogastropoda
- Family: Conidae
- Genus: Conus
- Subgenus: Kalloconus da Motta, 1991

Type species
- Conus pulcher [[[John Lightfoot (biologist)|Lightfoot]]], 1786

Synonyms
- Kalloconus da Motta, 1991; Genuanoconus J. K. Tucker & M. Tenorio, 2009; Kalloconus (Trovaoconus) J. K. Tucker & M. Tenorio, 2009

= Conus (Kalloconus) =

Subgenus of gastropods

Kalloconus is a subgenus of sea snails, marine gastropod molluscs in the family Conidae, the cone snails and their allies.

In the new classification of the family Conidae by Puillandre N., Duda T.F., Meyer C., Olivera B.M. & Bouchet P. (2015), Kalloconus has become a subgenus of Conus as Conus (Kalloconus) da Motta, 1991 (type species: Conus pulcher [Lightfoot], 1786) represented as Conus Linnaeus, 1758

== Distinguishing characteristics ==
The Tucker & Tenorio 2009 taxonomy distinguishes Kalloconus from Conus in the following ways:

- Genus Conus sensu stricto Linnaeus, 1758

Shell characters (living and fossil species)

The basic shell shape is conical to elongated conical, has a deep anal notch on the shoulder, a smooth periostracum and a small operculum. The shoulder of the shell is usually nodulose and the protoconch is usually multispiral. Markings often include the presence of tents except for black or white color variants, with the absence of spiral lines of minute tents and textile bars.

Radular tooth (not known for fossil species)

The radula has an elongated anterior section with serrations and a large exposed terminating cusp, a non-obvious waist, blade is either small or absent and has a short barb, and lacks a basal spur.

Geographical distribution

These species are found in the Indo-Pacific region.

Feeding habits

These species eat other gastropods including cones.

- Subgenus Kalloconus da Motta, 1991

Shell characters (living and fossil species)

The shell is large and obconic with broad angulate shoulders slightly rounded on the edges. The protoconch is multispiral. The anal notch is moderately deep to deep in larger specimens, and shallower in smaller specimens. The shell is ornamented with spots and dashes in spiral rows, and cords are either absent, very small and numerous, or die out early on whorl tops. The periostracum is smooth and thin, and the operculum is moderate in size.

Radular tooth (not known for fossil species)

The anterior sections of the radular tooth is substantially longer than the posterior section, and the blade is relatively short being one third to one-half the length of the anterior section. A basal spur is present, the barb is short. The radular tooth has a major row of serrations flanked by rows of smaller serrations.

Geographical distribution

The species in this genus occur in the West African region to Europe.

Feeding habits

These cone snails are vermivorous, meaning that the cones prey on polychaete worms.

== Species list ==
This list of species is based on the information in the World Register of Marine Species (WoRMS) list. Species within the genus Kalloconus include:

- Kalloconus byssinus (Röding, 1798): synonym of Conus byssinus (Röding, 1798)
- Kalloconus pulcher ([Lightfoot], 1786): synonym of Conus pulcher [Lightfoot], 1786
