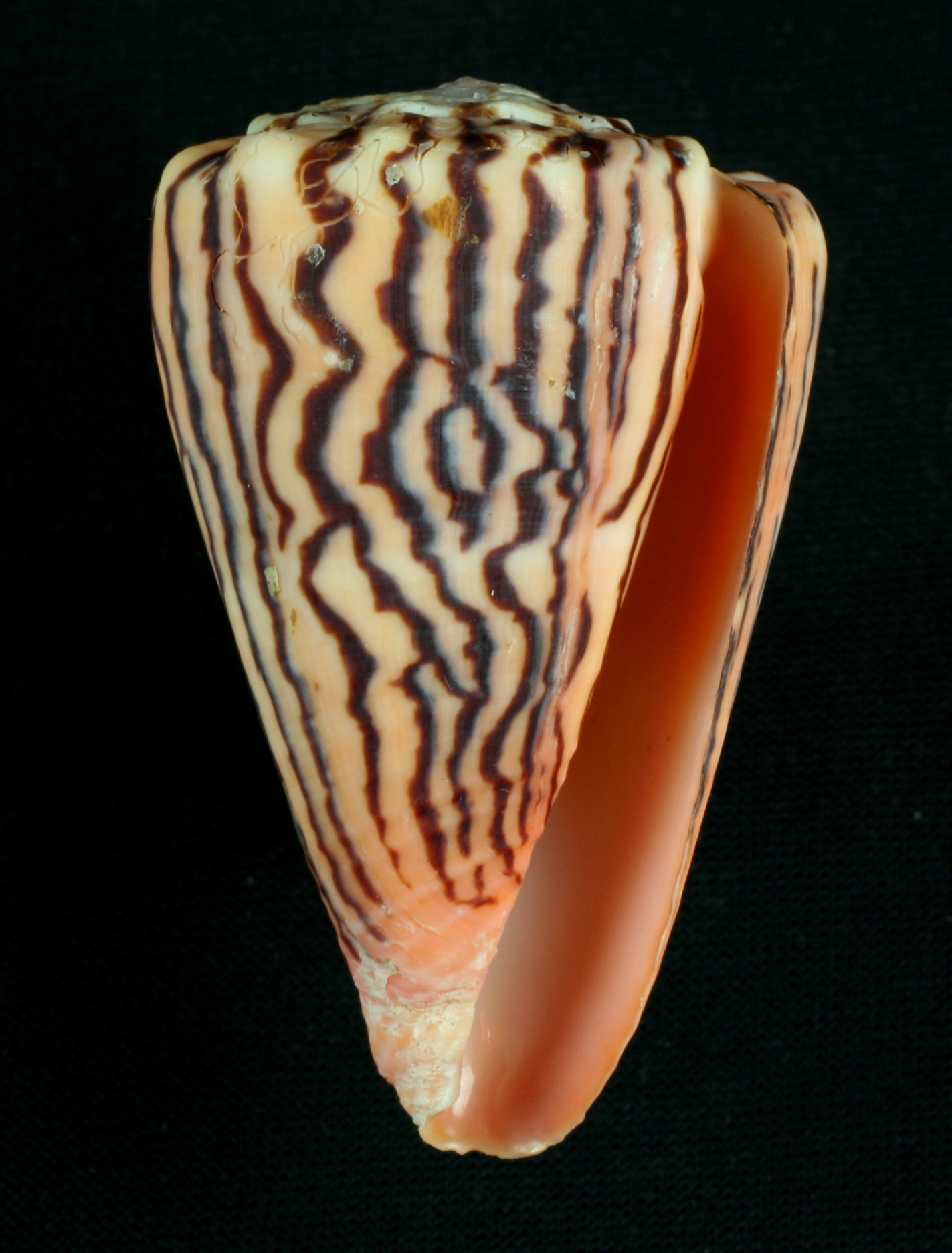
- Apertural view of shell of Ductoconus princeps (Linnaeus, 1758).

Scientific classification
- Kingdom: Animalia
- Phylum: Mollusca
- Class: Gastropoda
- Subclass: Caenogastropoda
- Order: Neogastropoda
- Family: Conidae
- Genus: Conus
- Subgenus: Ductoconus da Motta, 1991

Type species
- Conus princeps Linnaeus, 1758

Synonyms
- Arubaconus Petuch, 2013; Ductoconus da Motta, 1991

= Conus (Ductoconus) =

Subgenus of gastropods

Ductoconus is a subgenus of sea snails, marine gastropod mollusks in the genus Conus, family Conidae, the cone snails and their allies.

In the latest classification of the family Conidae by Puillandre N., Duda T.F., Meyer C., Olivera B.M. & Bouchet P. (2015), Ductoconus has become a subgenus of Conus as Conus (Ductoconus) represented as Conus Linnaeus, 1758

== Distinguishing characteristics ==
The Tucker & Tenorio 2009 taxonomy distinguishes Ductoconus from Conus in the following ways:

- Genus Conus sensu stricto Linnaeus, 1758

Shell characters (living and fossil species)

The basic shell shape is conical to elongated conical, has a deep anal notch on the shoulder, a smooth periostracum and a small operculum. The shoulder of the shell is usually nodulose and the protoconch is usually multispiral. Markings often include the presence of tents except for black or white color variants, with the absence of spiral lines of minute tents and textile bars.

Radular tooth (not known for fossil species)

The radula has an elongated anterior section with serrations and a large exposed terminating cusp, a non-obvious waist, blade is either small or absent and has a short barb, and lacks a basal spur.

Geographical distribution

These species are found in the Indo-Pacific region.

Feeding habits

These species eat other gastropods including cones.

- Subgenus Ductoconus da Motta, 1991

Shell characters (living and fossil species)

The shell is obconic. The protoconch is multispiral with 2.5 whorls, and with nodules which persist on all whorls. The anal notch is fairly deep. The periostracum is tufted and the operculum is large.

Radular tooth (not known for fossil species)

The anterior section of the radula is much longer than the posterior section. The blade is short, a basal spur is present, and the barb is short. The radular tooth has serrations and a terminating cusp which are both internal.

Geographical distribution

The only species in this genus occurs in the Eastern Pacific region.

Feeding habits

The only species in this genus is vermivorous (meaning that the cones prey on marine worms).

== Species list ==
This list of species is based on the information in the World Register of Marine Species (WoRMS) list. Species within the genus Ductoconus include:

- Ductoconus hieroglyphus Duclos, 1833: synonym of Conus (Ductoconus) hieroglyphus Duclos, 1833, represented as Conus hieroglyphus Duclos, 1833
- Ductoconus princeps (Linnaeus, 1758): synonym of Conus (Ductoconus) da Motta, 1991 represented as Conus princeps Linnaeus, 1758
