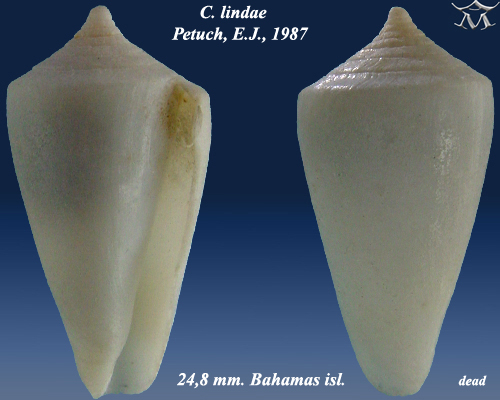
- Apertural and abapertural views of shell of Conus lindae (Petuch, E.J., 1987)

Scientific classification
- Kingdom: Animalia
- Phylum: Mollusca
- Class: Gastropoda
- Subclass: Caenogastropoda
- Order: Neogastropoda
- Family: Conidae
- Genus: Conus
- Subgenus: Lindaconus; Petuch, 2002

Type species
- Conus lindae Petuch, 1987

Synonyms
- Lindaconus Petuch, 2002; Spuriconus Petuch, 2003

= Conus (Lindaconus) =

Subgenus of sea snails in the family Conidae

Lindaconus is a subgenus of sea snails, marine gastropod molluscs in the genus Conus, family Conidae, the cone snails and their allies.

In the latest classification of the family Conidae by Puillandre N., Duda T.F., Meyer C., Olivera B.M. & Bouchet P. (2015), Lindaconus has become a subgenus of Conus as Conus (Lindaconus) Petuch, 2002 (type species: Conus lindae Petuch, 1987) represented as Conus Linnaeus, 1758

== Species ==
The following species are alternate representation:

- Lindaconus bahamensis (Vink & Röckel, 1995): synonym of Conus (Lindaconus) bahamensis Vink & Röckel, 1995 represented as Conus bahamensis Vink & Röckel, 1995
- Lindaconus lindae (Petuch, 1987): synonym of Conus (Lindaconus) lindae Petuch, 1987 represented as Conus lindae Petuch, 1987
- Lindaconus spurius (Gmelin, 1791): synonym of Conus (Lindaconus) spurius Gmelin, 1791 represented as Conus spurius Gmelin, 1791
- Lindaconus spurius baylei (Jousseaume, 1872): synonym of Conus spurius baylei Jousseaume, 1872
- Lindaconus therriaulti Petuch, 2013: synonym of Conus (Lindaconus) therriaulti (Petuch, 2013) represented as Conus therriaulti (Petuch, 2013)
