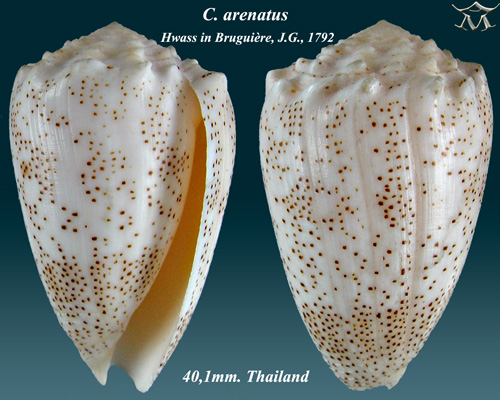
- Apertural and abapertural views of shell of Conus arenatus (Hwass in Bruguière, J.G., 1792)

Scientific classification
- Kingdom: Animalia
- Phylum: Mollusca
- Class: Gastropoda
- Subclass: Caenogastropoda
- Order: Neogastropoda
- Family: Conidae
- Genus: Conus
- Subgenus: Puncticulis; Swainson, 1840

Type species
- Conus arenatus Hwass in Bruguière, 1792

Synonyms
- Puncticulis Swainson, 1840

= Conus (Puncticulis) =

Subgenus of gastropods

Puncticulis is a subgenus of sea snails, marine gastropod molluscs in the genus Conus, family Conidae, the cone snails and their allies.

In the latest classification of the family Conidae by Puillandre N., Duda T.F., Meyer C., Olivera B.M. & Bouchet P. (2015), Puncticulis has become a subgenus of Conus as Conus (Puncticulis) Swainson, 1840 (type species: Conus arenatus Hwass in Bruguière, 1792) represented as Conus Linnaeus, 1758

== Species ==
- Puncticulis arenatus (Hwass in Bruguière, 1792) represented as Conus arenatus Hwass in Bruguière, 1792 (alternate representation)
- Puncticulis pulicarius (Hwass in Bruguière, 1792) represented as Conus pulicarius Hwass in Bruguière, 1792 (alternate representation)
- Puncticulis zeylanicus (Gmelin, 1791) represented as Conus zeylanicus Gmelin, 1791 (alternate representation)
- Conus (Puncticulis) caracteristicus Fischer von Waldheim, 1807 represented as Conus caracteristicus Fischer von Waldheim, 1807
- Conus (Puncticulis) vautieri Kiener, 1847 represented as Conus vautieri Kiener, 1847
