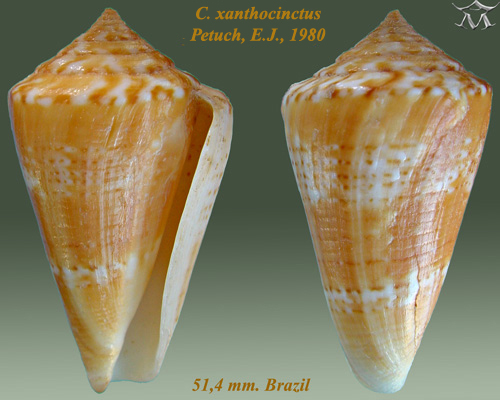
- Apertural and abapertural views of shell of Conus xanthocinctus Petuch, E.J., 1980

Scientific classification
- Kingdom: Animalia
- Phylum: Mollusca
- Class: Gastropoda
- Subclass: Caenogastropoda
- Order: Neogastropoda
- Family: Conidae
- Genus: Conus
- Species: C. xanthocinctus

Binomial name
- Conus xanthocinctus Petuch, 1986

Synonyms
- Conus (Lamniconus) xanthocinctus Petuch, 1986 · accepted, alternate representation; Lamniconus xanthocinctus (Petuch, 1986)

= Conus xanthocinctus =

Species of sea snail

Conus xanthocinctus is a species of sea snail, a marine gastropod mollusc in the family Conidae, the cone snails and their allies.

Like all species within the genus Conus, these snails are predatory and venomous. They are capable of stinging humans, therefore live ones should be handled carefully or not at all.

== Distribution ==
Western Atlantic Ocean: Brazil.

== Taxonomy ==
Conus xanthocinctus Petuch, 1986, was incorrectly listed as a synonym of Conus lemniscatus with the author noted as "Petuch, 1980", and it is recognized as a valid species, and an alternative representation in the subgenus Lamniconus.
