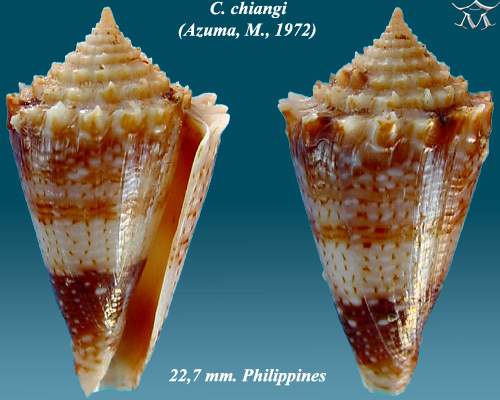
- Apertural and abapertural views of shell of Conus chiangi (Azuma, M., 1972)

Scientific classification
- Kingdom: Animalia
- Phylum: Mollusca
- Class: Gastropoda
- (unranked): clade Caenogastropoda clade Hypsogastropoda clade Neogastropoda
- Superfamily: Conoidea
- Family: Conidae
- Genus: Taranteconus Azuma, 1972

Type species
- Taranteconus chiangi Azuma, 1972

Synonyms
- Conus (Stephanoconus) Mörch, 1852; Cornutoconus Suzuki, 1972

= Taranteconus =

Genus of gastropods

Taranteconus is a synonym of Conus (Stephanoconus) Mörch, 1852. This was a genus of sea snails, marine gastropod mollusks in the family Conidae, the cone snails and their allies.

== Species ==
- Taranteconus chiangi Azuma, 1972: synonym of Conus chiangi (Azuma, 1972)
- Taranteconus polongimarumai (Kosuge, 1980): synonym of Conus polongimarumai Kosuge, 1980
