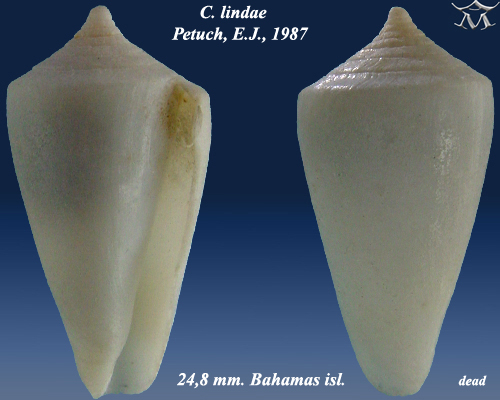
- Apertural and abapertural views of shell of Conus lindae Petuch, E.J., 1987
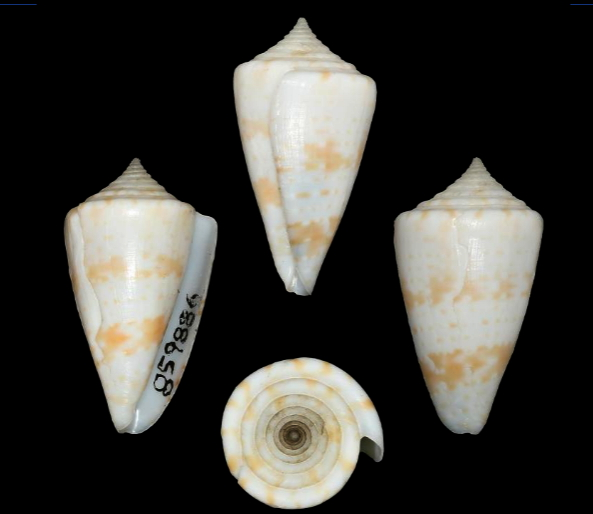

Conservation status
- Least Concern (IUCN 3.1)

Scientific classification
- Kingdom: Animalia
- Phylum: Mollusca
- Class: Gastropoda
- Subclass: Caenogastropoda
- Order: Neogastropoda
- Superfamily: Conoidea
- Family: Conidae
- Genus: Conus
- Species: C. lindae

Binomial name
- Conus lindae Petuch, 1987

Synonyms
- Conus (Lindaconus) lindae Petuch, 1987 · accepted, alternate representation; Lindaconus lindae (Petuch, 1987)

= Conus lindae =

Species of sea snail

Conus lindae is a species of sea snail, a marine gastropod mollusk in the family Conidae, the cone snails and their allies. Conus lindae is the type species of the subgenus Lindaconus Petuch, 2002.

Like all species within the genus Conus, these snails are predatory and venomous. They are capable of stinging humans, therefore live ones should be handled carefully or not at all.

== Description ==
Original description: "Shell solid, stocky, broad across shoulder, with relatively low spire; shoulder distinctly rounded; spire whorls slightly canaliculated; body whorl shiny, highly polished, with waxy feel; aperture narrow; protoconch very large, rounded, mamillate; shell color varying from pure white(paratype, Key collection) to pale pink, overlaid with 2 bands of salmon-pink dots (holotype); wide bands of salmon-pink blotches arranged with one above mid-body and one below mid-body near anterior end; rounded shoulder and canaliculate spire whorls marked with evenly-spaced, thin, radiating, pale salmon-orange flammules; interior of aperture white; periostracum thin, smooth, yellow, translucent."

The maximum recorded shell length is 31 mm.

== Distribution ==
Locus typicus: "Southern coast of Grand Bahama Island, Bahamas."

This marine species occurs in deep water off the Bahamas.

== Habitat ==
Minimum recorded depth is 240 m. Maximum recorded depth is 250 m.
