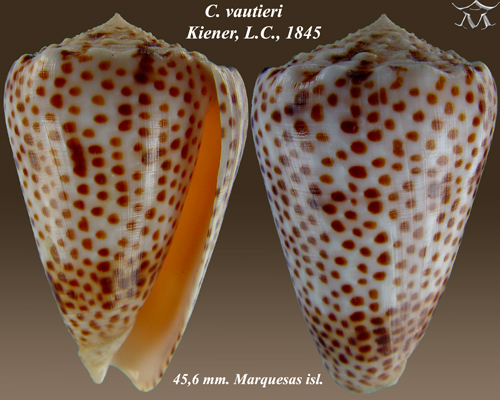
- Apertural and abapertural views of shell of Conus vautieri Kiener, L.C., 1845
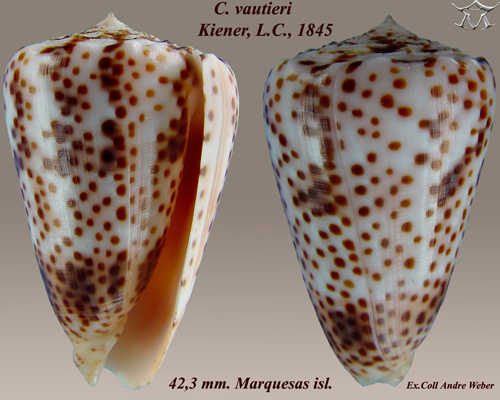

Scientific classification
- Domain: Eukaryota
- Kingdom: Animalia
- Phylum: Mollusca
- Class: Gastropoda
- Subclass: Caenogastropoda
- Order: Neogastropoda
- Superfamily: Conoidea
- Family: Conidae
- Genus: Conus
- Species: C. vautieri

Binomial name
- Conus vautieri Kiener, 1845

Synonyms
- Conus (Puncticulis) vautieri Kiener, 1847 · accepted, alternate representation; Conus pulicarius vautieri Kiener, 1845; Puncticulis pulicarius vautieri Kiener, 1845

= Conus vautieri =

Species of sea snail

Conus vautieri, common name Vautier's cone, is a species of sea snail, a marine gastropod mollusk in the family Conidae, the cone snails and their allies.

Like all species within the genus Conus, these snails are predatory and venomous. They are capable of stinging humans, therefore live ones should be handled carefully or not at all.

== Taxonomic relation ==
Conus vautieri was originally named as a subspecies of Conus pulicarius Hwass in Bruguière, 1792, but has been recognized as a valid species, alternative representation in the genus Puncticulis.

== Description ==
The size of the shell varies between 27 mm and 75 mm. The spire is tuberculate. The sides of the body whorl are nearly direct. The color of the shell is white, with chestnut spots, overlaid here and there by lighter chestnut clouds.

== Distribution ==
This species occurs in the Pacific Ocean off the Marquesas and New Caledonia.
