= Lilliconus biraghii =

Scientific classification
- Kingdom: Animalia
- Phylum: Mollusca
- Class: Gastropoda
- Subclass: Caenogastropoda
- Order: Neogastropoda
- Superfamily: Conoidea
- Family: Conidae
- Genus: Lilliconus
- Species: L. biraghii

Binomial name
- Lilliconus biraghii (G. Raybaudi Massilia, 1992)

Synonyms
- Conasprella (Lilliconus) biraghii (G. Raybaudi Massilia, 1992); Conasprella biraghii (G. Raybaudi Massilia, 1992); Conus biraghii (G. Raybaudi Massilia, 1992); Leptoconus biraghii G. Raybaudi Massilia, 1992 (original combination)

Species of gastropod

Lilliconus biraghii is a species of sea snail, a marine gastropod mollusk, in the family Conidae, the cone snails and their allies.

== Subspecies ==
- Lilliconus biraghii biraghii (G. Raybaudi Massilia, 1992)
- Lilliconus biraghii congruens Korn & G. Raybaudi Massilia, 1993
- Lilliconus biraghii omanensis (Moolenbeek & Coomans, 1993)

== Description ==
The size of the shell varies between 9 mm and 17 mm.

== Distribution ==
This species occurs in the Indian Ocean off Somalia.
