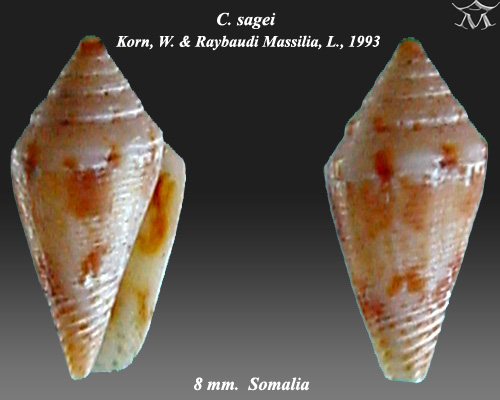
- Apertural and abapertural views of shell of Lilliconus sagei (Korn, W. & Raybaudi Massilia, L., 1993)
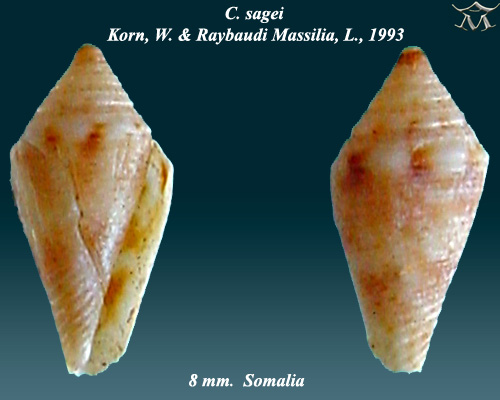

Scientific classification
- Kingdom: Animalia
- Phylum: Mollusca
- Class: Gastropoda
- Subclass: Caenogastropoda
- Order: Neogastropoda
- Superfamily: Conoidea
- Family: Conidae
- Genus: Lilliconus
- Species: L. sagei

Binomial name
- Lilliconus sagei (Korn & G. Raybaudi Massilia, 1993)

Synonyms
- Conasprella (Lilliconus) sagei (Korn & G. Raybaudi Massilia, 1993); Conasprella sagei (Korn & G. Raybaudi Massilia, 1993); Conus sagei Korn & G. Raybaudi Massilia, 1993

= Lilliconus sagei =

Species of gastropod

Lilliconus sagei is a species of sea snail, a marine gastropod mollusk, in the family Conidae, the cone snails and their allies.

Like all species within the genus Conasprella, these cone snails are predatory and venomous. They are capable of stinging humans, therefore live ones should be handled carefully or not at all.

== Description ==
The shell attains about 9 mm in length, and features unique markings, as is typical of most other cone snails.

== Distribution ==
This marine species occurs off the coasts of Madagascar and Somalia.
