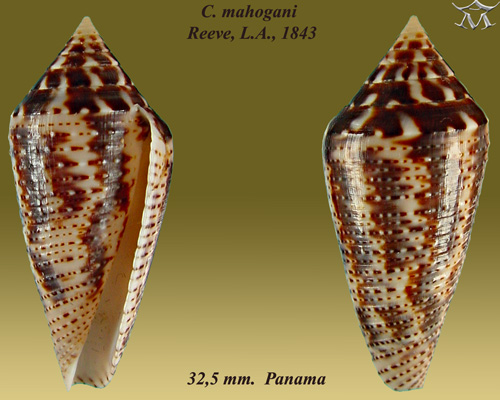
- Apertural and abapertural views of shell of Conasprella mahogani (Reeve, L.A., 1843)
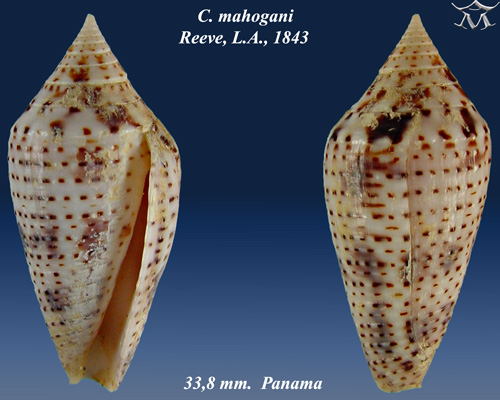

Scientific classification
- Kingdom: Animalia
- Phylum: Mollusca
- Class: Gastropoda
- Subclass: Caenogastropoda
- Order: Neogastropoda
- Superfamily: Conoidea
- Family: Conidae
- Genus: Conasprella
- Species: C. mahogani

Binomial name
- Conasprella mahogani (Reeve, 1843)

Synonyms
- Conasprella (Ximeniconus) mahogani (Reeve, 1843) · accepted, alternate representation; Conus mahogani Reeve, 1843 (original combination); Ximeniconus mahogani (Reeve, 1843)

= Conasprella mahogani =

Species of gastropod

Conasprella mahogani is a species of sea snail, a marine gastropod mollusk in the family Conidae, the cone snails and their allies.

Like all species within the genus Conasprella, these cone snails are predatory and venomous. They are capable of stinging humans, therefore live ones should be handled carefully or not at all.

== Description ==
The size of the shell varies between 27 mm and 48 mm.

== Distribution ==
This marine species is native to the eastern Pacific Ocean. Its distribution ranges from the Gulf of California in northwestern Mexico, extending south along the Pacific coasts of Central and South America to northern Peru. It is also found around several offshore island groups, including the Galápagos Islands, Cocos Island, Malpelo Island, and the Revillagigedo Islands.

The species inhabits shallow coastal waters, rocky and coral reefs, and is typically found within the continental shelf zone, from the intertidal area down to depths of approximately 30 meters. It is a notable component of reef ecosystems in the tropical eastern Pacific and is present in several marine protected areas throughout its range.
