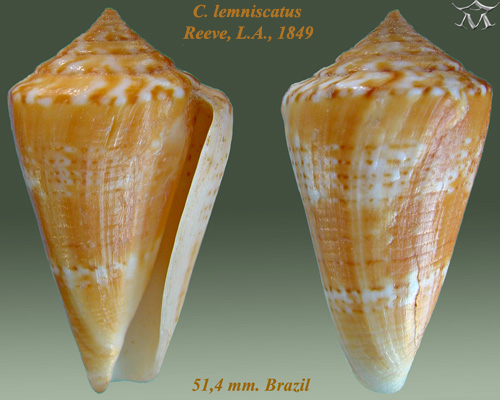
- Apertural and abapertural views of shell of Conus lemniscatus Reeve, L.A., 1849

Conservation status
- Least Concern (IUCN 3.1)

Scientific classification
- Kingdom: Animalia
- Phylum: Mollusca
- Class: Gastropoda
- Subclass: Caenogastropoda
- Order: Neogastropoda
- Superfamily: Conoidea
- Family: Conidae
- Genus: Conus
- Species: C. lemniscatus

Binomial name
- Conus lemniscatus Reeve, 1849

Synonyms
- Conus (Lamniconus) lemniscatus Reeve, 1849 · accepted, alternate representation; Conus clenchi Martins, 1945; Conus lemniscatus lemniscatus Reeve, 1849; Conus sagittatus G. B. Sowerby II, 1865; Conus sagittiferus G. B. Sowerby II, 1866; Lamniconus lemniscatus (Reeve, 1849); Lamniconus lemniscatus lemniscatus (Reeve, 1849)

= Conus lemniscatus =

Species of sea snail

Conus lemniscatus, common name the ribbon cone, is a species of sea snail, a marine gastropod mollusk in the family Conidae, the cone snails and their allies.

Subspecies

- Conus lemniscatus carcellesi Martins, 1945 (synonym: Lamniconus lemniscatus carcellesi (Martins, 1945)): synonym of Conus carcellesi Martins, 1945
- Conus lemniscatus lemniscatus Reeve, 1849 (synonym: Lamniconus lemniscatus lemniscatus (Reeve, 1849)): synonym of Conus lemniscatus Reeve, 1849

Like all species within the genus Conus, these snails are predatory and venomous. They are capable of stinging humans, therefore live ones should be handled carefully or not at all.

== Description ==
The size of an adult shell varies between 20 mm and 65 mm. The shell shows slightly contracted sides. The spire is acuminated with strong growth lines. The body whorl is delicately ridged throughout. The color of the shell is whitish, maculated with chestnut, and with every alternate ridge chestnut-spotted.

== Distribution ==
This species occurs in the Caribbean Sea and in the Western Atlantic Ocean off Brazil and Argentina.

== Additional literature ==
- Sowerby, G. B., II. 1865. Descriptions of two new species of Conus from the collection of H. Cuming, ESQ., and two from the collection of the late Mr. Denisson. Proceedings of the Zoological Society of London 1865:518–519, pl. 32
- Filmer R.M. (2001). A Catalogue of Nomenclature and Taxonomy in the Living Conidae 1758 – 1998. Backhuys Publishers, Leiden. 388pp
- Tucker J.K. (2009). Recent cone species database. September 4, 2009 Edition
- Tucker J.K. & Tenorio M.J. (2009) Systematic classification of Recent and fossil conoidean gastropods. Hackenheim: Conchbooks. 296 pp.
- Puillandre N., Duda T.F., Meyer C., Olivera B.M. & Bouchet P. (2015). One, four or 100 genera? A new classification of the cone snails. Journal of Molluscan Studies. 81: 1–23
