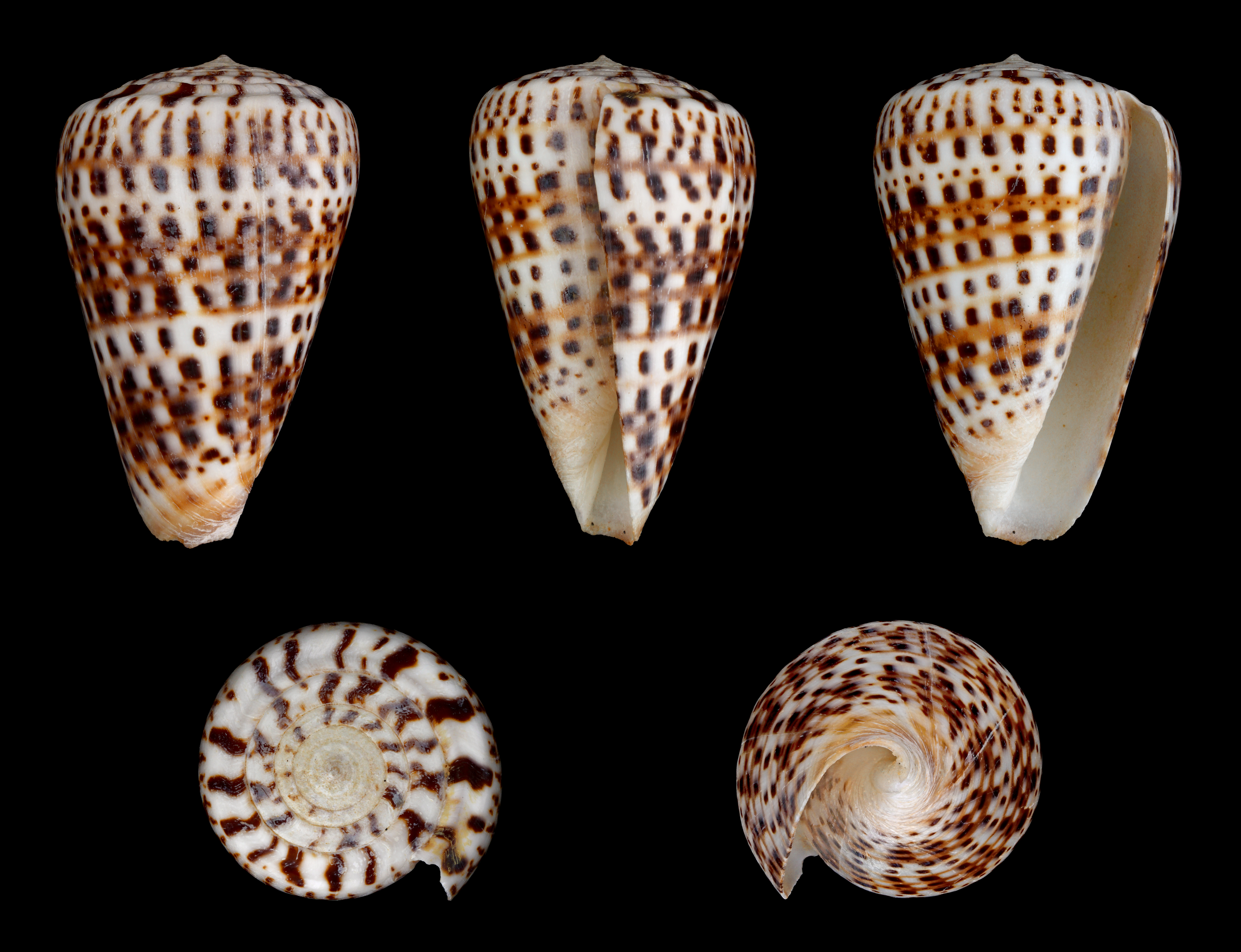
- Five views of a shell of Conus byssinus (Röding, P.F., 1798)

Scientific classification
- Kingdom: Animalia
- Phylum: Mollusca
- Class: Gastropoda
- Subclass: Caenogastropoda
- Order: Neogastropoda
- Superfamily: Conoidea
- Family: Conidae
- Genus: Conus
- Species: C. byssinus

Binomial name
- Conus byssinus (Röding, 1798)

Synonyms
- Conus (Kalloconus) byssinus (Röding, 1798) · accepted, alternate representation; Cucullus byssinus Röding, 1798; Kalloconus byssinus (Röding, 1798)

= Conus byssinus =

Species of sea snail

Conus byssinus, common name the lesser butterfly cone, is a species of sea snail, a marine gastropod mollusk in the family Conidae, the cone snails and their allies.

Like all species within the genus Conus, these snails are predatory and venomous. They are capable of stinging humans, therefore live ones should be handled carefully or not at all.

== Description ==
The size of the shell varies between 33 mm and 80 mm.

== Distribution ==
This species occurs in the Atlantic Ocean off the Western Sahara.
