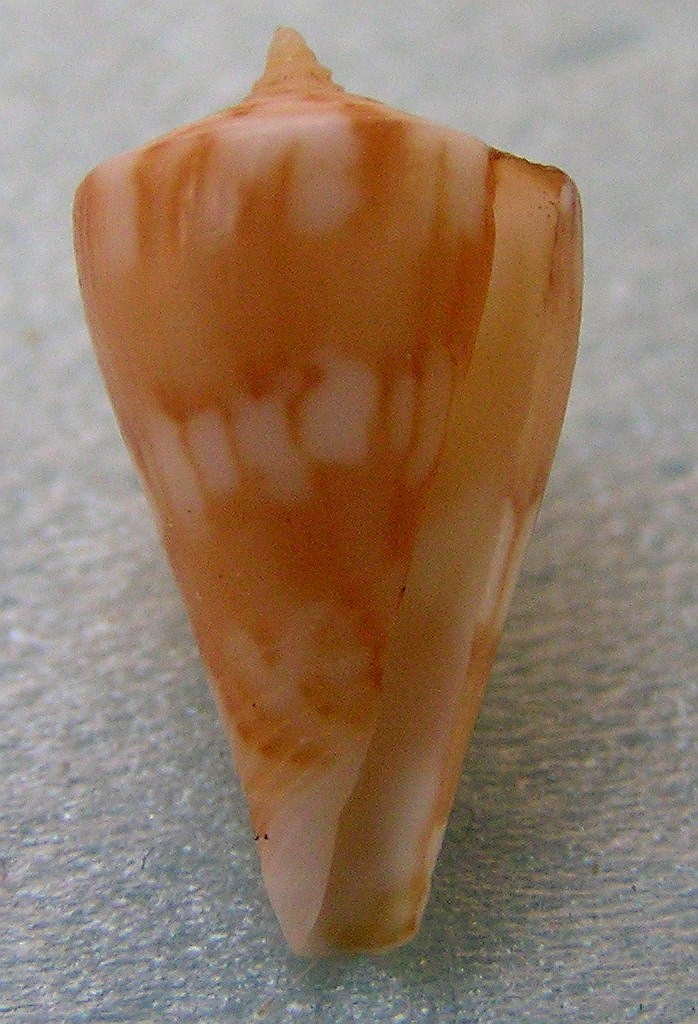
- Apertural view of a shell of Conus capitanellus

Conservation status
- Least Concern (IUCN 3.1)

Scientific classification
- Kingdom: Animalia
- Phylum: Mollusca
- Class: Gastropoda
- Subclass: Caenogastropoda
- Order: Neogastropoda
- Superfamily: Conoidea
- Family: Conidae
- Genus: Conus
- Species: C. capitanellus

Binomial name
- Conus capitanellus Fulton, 1938

Synonyms
- Conus (Splinoconus) capitanellus Fulton, 1938 accepted, alternate representation; Stellaconus capitanellus Fulton H.C., 1938

= Conus capitanellus =

Species of sea snail

Conus capitanellus, common name the little captain cone, is a species of sea snail, a marine gastropod mollusk in the family Conidae, the cone snails and their allies.

Like all species within the genus Conus, these snails are predatory and venomous. They are capable of stinging humans, therefore live ones should be handled carefully or not at all.

== Description ==
The size of an adult shell varies between 20 mm and 40 mm. It is reddish-orange with some tan.

== Distribution ==
This species occurs in the Pacific Ocean off Japan and the Philippines.

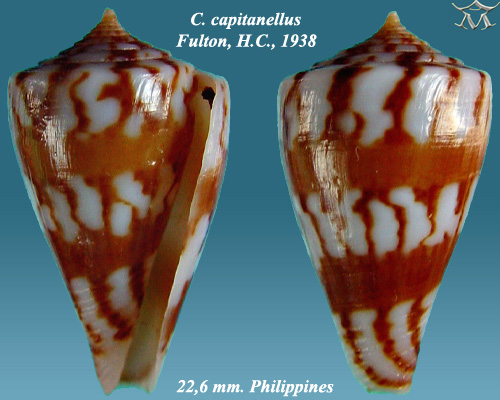
Conus capitanellus Fulton, H.C., 1938

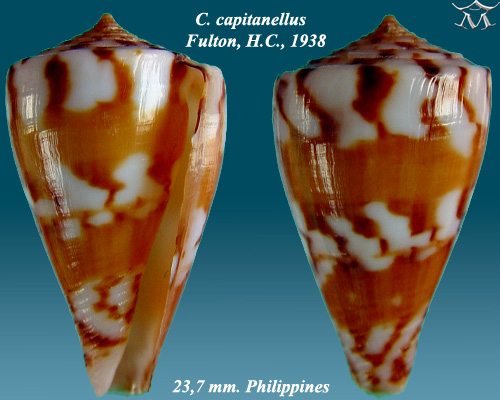
Conus capitanellus Fulton, H.C., 1938
