= Conus therriaulti =

Scientific classification
- Kingdom: Animalia
- Phylum: Mollusca
- Class: Gastropoda
- Subclass: Caenogastropoda
- Order: Neogastropoda
- Superfamily: Conoidea
- Family: Conidae
- Genus: Conus
- Species: C. therriaulti

Binomial name
- Conus therriaulti (Petuch, 2013)

Synonyms
- Conus (Lindaconus) therriaulti (Petuch, 2013) · accepted, alternate representation; Lindaconus therriaulti Petuch, 2013 (original combination)

Species of sea snail

Conus therriaulti is a species of sea snail, a marine gastropod mollusk in the family Conidae, the cone snails, cone shells or cones.

These snails are predatory and venomous. They are capable of stinging humans.

== Description ==
The size of the shell attains 43 mm.

== Distribution ==
This marine species of cone snail occurs in the Caribbean Sea off Yucatán, Mexico.
