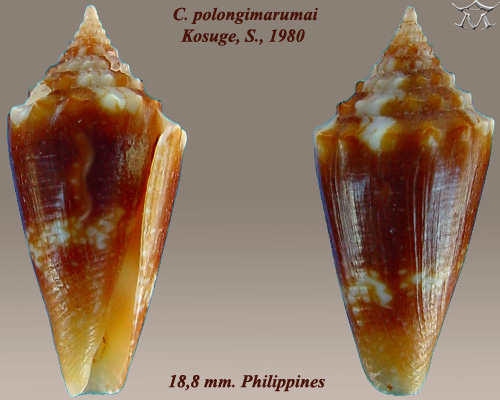
- Apertural and abapertural views of shell of Conus polongimarumai Kosuge, S., 1980

Scientific classification
- Kingdom: Animalia
- Phylum: Mollusca
- Class: Gastropoda
- Subclass: Caenogastropoda
- Order: Neogastropoda
- Superfamily: Conoidea
- Family: Conidae
- Genus: Conus
- Species: C. polongimarumai

Binomial name
- Conus polongimarumai Kosuge, 1980

Synonyms
- Conus (Stephanoconus) polongimarumai Kosuge, 1980 · accepted, alternate representation; Rolaniconus polongimarumai (Kosuge, 1980); Taranteconus polongimarumai (Kosuge, 1980)

= Conus polongimarumai =

Species of sea snail

Conus polongimarumai is a species of sea snail, a marine gastropod mollusk in the family Conidae, the cone snails and their allies.

Like all species within the genus Conus, these snails are predatory and venomous. They are capable of stinging humans, therefore live ones should be handled carefully or not at all.

== Description ==
The size of the shell varies between 13 mm and 32 mm.

== Distribution ==
This marine species occurs off the Philippines, the Marshall Islands; New Caledonia, and Western Thailand.
