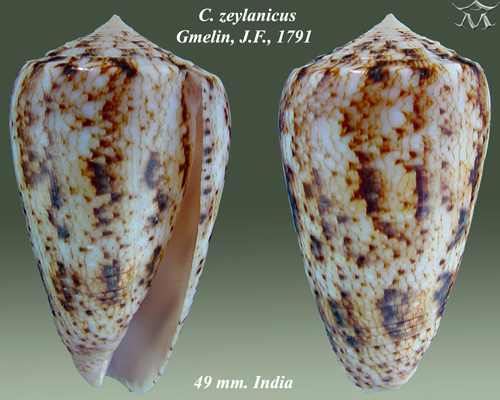
- Apertural and abapertural views of shell of Conus zeylanicus Gmelin, J.F., 1791
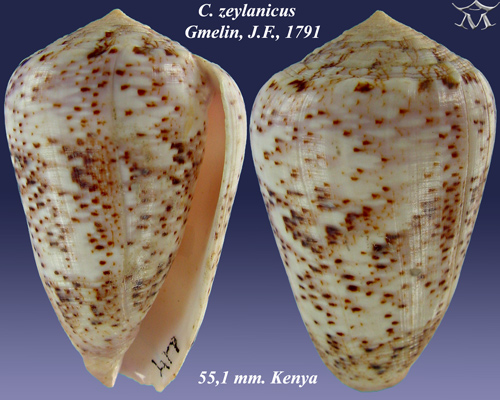

Conservation status
- Least Concern (IUCN 3.1)

Scientific classification
- Kingdom: Animalia
- Phylum: Mollusca
- Class: Gastropoda
- Subclass: Caenogastropoda
- Order: Neogastropoda
- Superfamily: Conoidea
- Family: Conidae
- Genus: Conus
- Species: C. zeylanicus

Binomial name
- Conus zeylanicus Petuch, 1987

Synonyms
- Conus (Puncticulis) zeylanicus Gmelin, 1791 · accepted, alternate representation; Conus ceylonicus Reeve, 1849; Conus ceylonicus G. B. Sowerby II, 1857; Conus obesus Hwass in Bruguière, 1792; Conus zeylandicus [sic] (misspelling); Cucullus meningeus Röding, 1798; Cucullus theobroma Röding, 1798; Puncticulis zeylanicus (Gmelin, 1791)

= Conus zeylanicus =

Species of sea snail

Conus zeylanicus, common name the obese cone, is a species of sea snail, a marine gastropod mollusk in the family Conidae, the cone snails and their allies.

These snails are predatory and venomous. They are capable of stinging humans, therefore live ones should be handled carefully or not at all.

== Description ==
The size of the shell varies between 27 mm and 78 mm. The shell is obsoletely coronated with tubercles. The stout body whorl is somewhat convex. The ground color of the shell is white or very pale yellow or bluish, faintly clouded, with numerous small chestnut or chocolate spots and short lines, often forming dark clouds, so placed as to make interrupted, revolving bands.

== Distribution ==
This marine species occurs in the Indian Ocean (Tanzania, Mascarene Islands) and eastwards as far as Indonesia.
