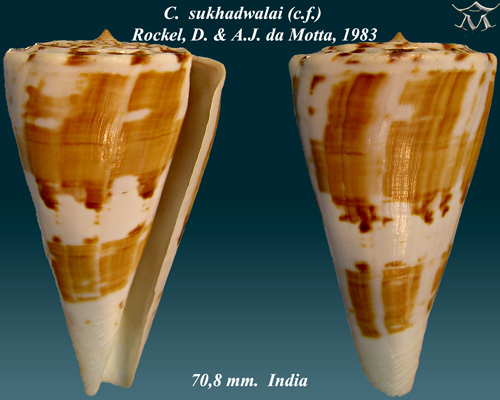
- Apertural and abapertural views of shell of Conus sukhadwalai Rockel, D. & A.J. da Motta, 1983

Scientific classification
- Kingdom: Animalia
- Phylum: Mollusca
- Class: Gastropoda
- Subclass: Caenogastropoda
- Order: Neogastropoda
- Superfamily: Conoidea
- Family: Conidae
- Genus: Conus
- Species: C. sukhadwalai

Binomial name
- Conus sukhadwalai Röckel & da Motta, 1983

Synonyms
- Conus (Splinoconus) sukhadwalai Röckel & da Motta, 1983 · accepted, alternate representation; Stellaconus sukhadwalai (Röckel & da Motta, 1983)

= Conus sukhadwalai =

Species of sea snail

Conus sukhadwalai is a species of sea snail, a marine gastropod mollusk in the family Conidae, the cone snails and their allies.

Like all species within the genus Conus, these snails are predatory and venomous. They are capable of stinging humans, therefore live ones should be handled carefully or not at all.

== Description ==
The size of the shell varies between 37 mm and 50 mm.

== Distribution ==
This marine species occurs off Southern India.
