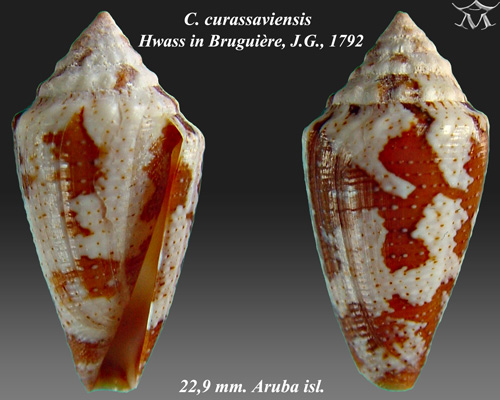
- Apertural and abapertural views of shell of Conus curassaviensis Hwass in Bruguière, J.G., 1792
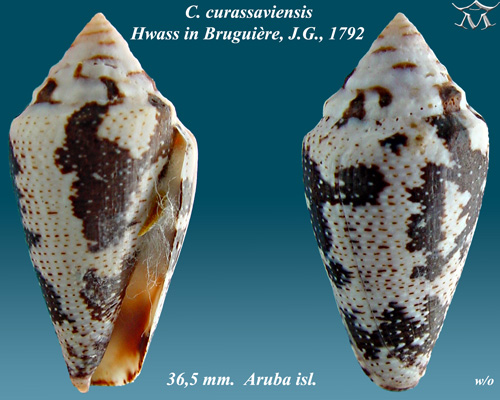

Conservation status
- Near Threatened (IUCN 3.1)

Scientific classification
- Kingdom: Animalia
- Phylum: Mollusca
- Class: Gastropoda
- Subclass: Caenogastropoda
- Order: Neogastropoda
- Superfamily: Conoidea
- Family: Conidae
- Genus: Conus
- Species: C. curassaviensis

Binomial name
- Conus curassaviensis Hwass in Bruguière, 1792

Synonyms
- Conus (Tenorioconus) curassaviensis Hwass in Bruguière, 1792 accepted, alternate representation; Conus cedonulli var. curassaviensis Hwass in Bruguière, 1792 (original rank); Protoconus curassaviensis (Hwass in Bruguière, 1792); Tenorioconus curassaviensis (Hwass in Bruguière, 1792)

= Conus curassaviensis =

Species of sea snail

Conus curassaviensis is a species of sea snail, a marine gastropod mollusk in the family Conidae, the cone snails and their allies.

Like all species within the genus Conus, these snails are predatory and venomous. They are capable of stinging humans, therefore live ones should be handled carefully or not at all.

== Distribution ==
This species occurs in the Caribbean Sea off Aruba, Netherlands Antilles.

== Description ==
The maximum recorded shell length is 51 mm.

== Habitat ==
Minimum recorded depth is 2 m. Maximum recorded depth is 9 m.
