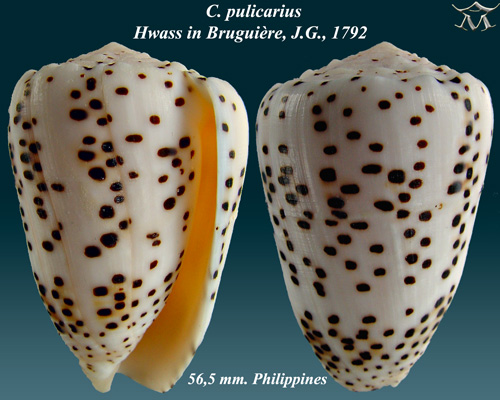
- Apertural (left) and abapertural (right) views of a shell of Conus pulicarius
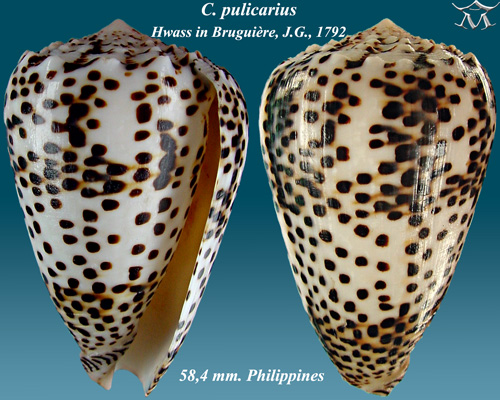

Scientific classification
- Kingdom: Animalia
- Phylum: Mollusca
- Class: Gastropoda
- Subclass: Caenogastropoda
- Order: Neogastropoda
- Superfamily: Conoidea
- Family: Conidae
- Genus: Conus
- Species: C. pulicarius

Binomial name
- Conus pulicarius Hwass in Bruguière, 1792

Synonyms
- Conus (Puncticulis) pulicarius Hwass in Bruguière, 1792 · accepted, alternate representation; Conus fustigatus Hwass in Bruguière, 1792; Cucullus punctulatus Röding, 1798; Poremskiconus abrolhosensis (Petuch, 1987)

= Conus pulicarius =

Species of sea snail

Conus pulicarius, common name the flea-bitten cone, is a species of sea snail, a marine gastropod mollusk in the family Conidae, the cone snails and their allies.

Like all species within the genus Conus, these snails are predatory and venomous. They are capable of stinging humans, therefore live ones should be handled carefully or not at all.

The subspecies Conus pulicarius vautieri Kiener, 1847 is a synonym of Conus vautieri Kiener, 1847

== Description ==
The size of the shell varies between 30 mm and 75 mm. The shell is white, covered by square-shaped, dark chocolate or nearly black spots, which sometimes by their juxtaposition indicate two bands. The spire is tuberculated. The epidermis, as in the other species of the group, is very thin and translucent.

The synonym Conus fustigatus includes the varieties in which the spots are larger and less numerous.

== Distribution ==
This marine species occurs in the Central and Western Pacific; Polynesia (not Marquesas); Cocos (Keeling) Island, New Guinea and Australia (Northern Territory, Queensland and Western Australia).

== Gallery ==
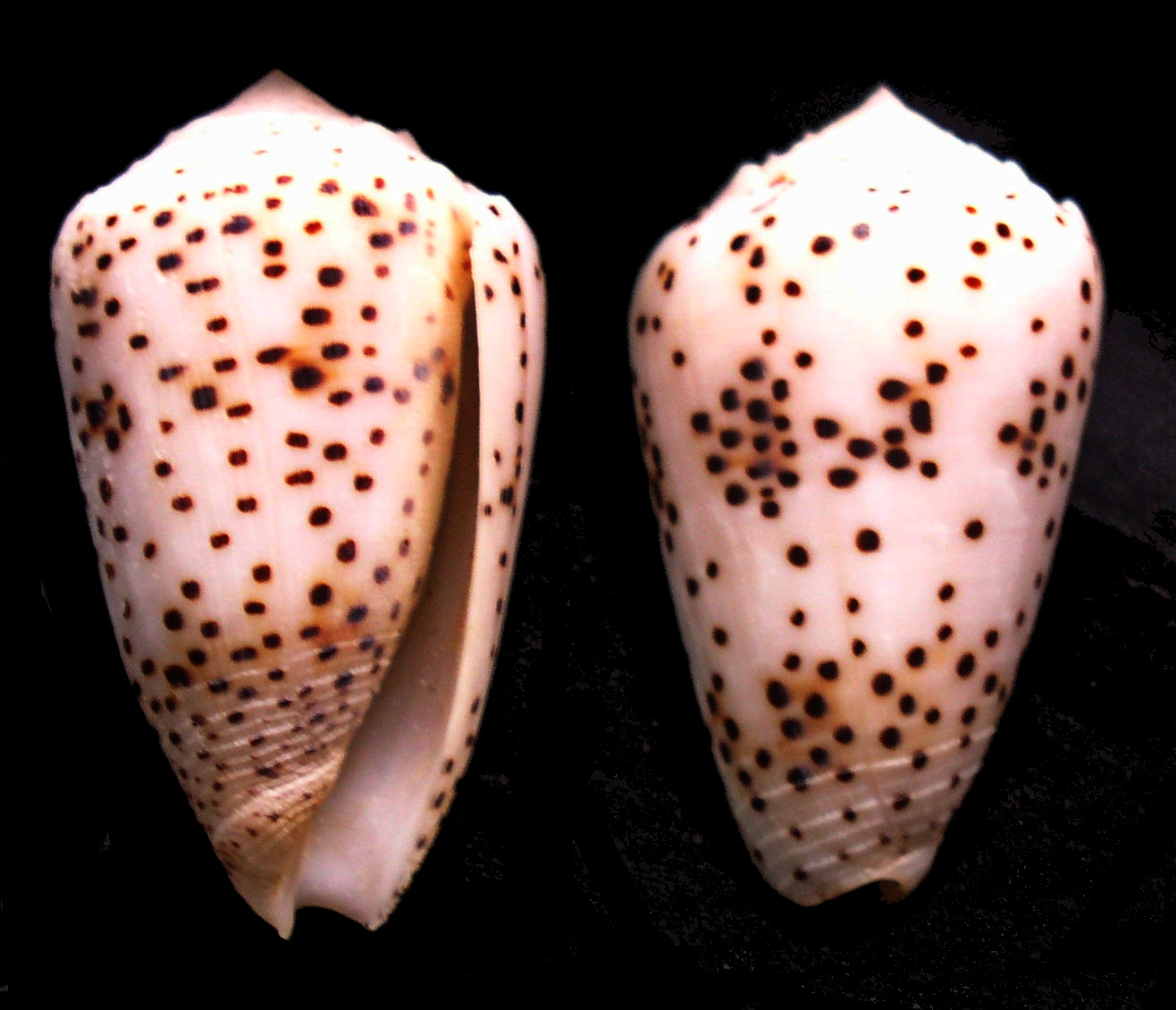
Conus pulicarius Hwass in Bruguière, J.G., 1792

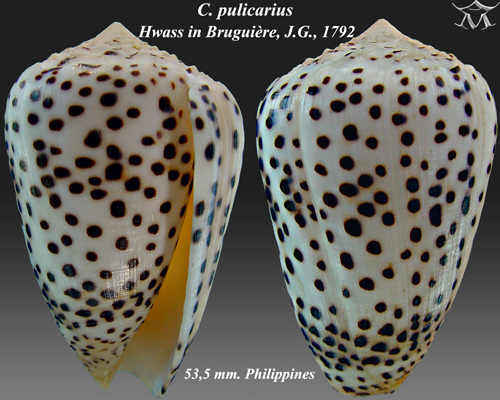
Conus pulicarius Hwass in Bruguière, J.G., 1792

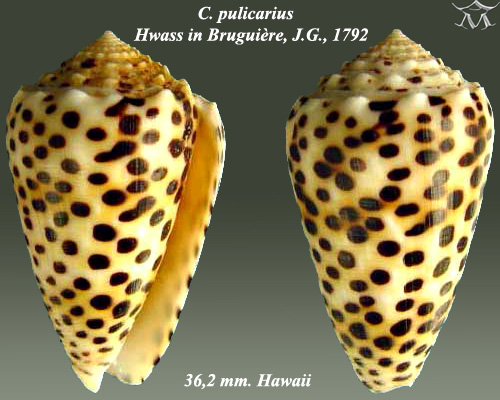
Conus pulicarius Hwass in Bruguière, J.G., 1792

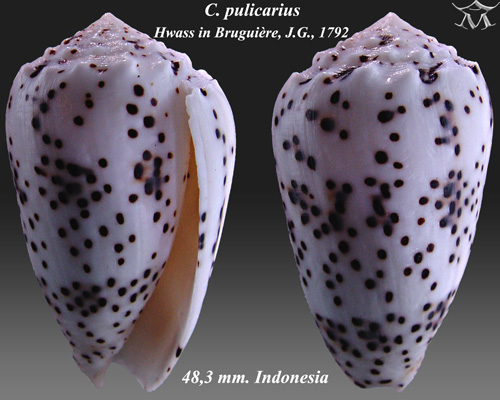
Conus pulicarius Hwass in Bruguière, J.G., 1792

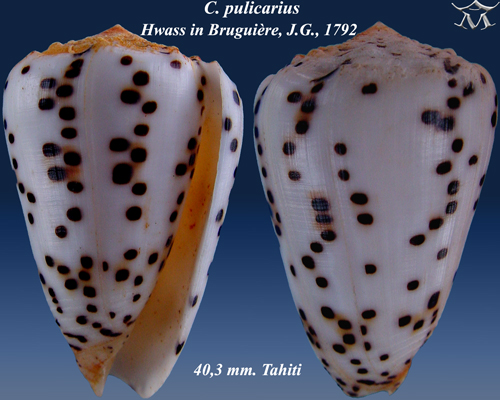
Conus pulicarius Hwass in Bruguière, J.G., 1792

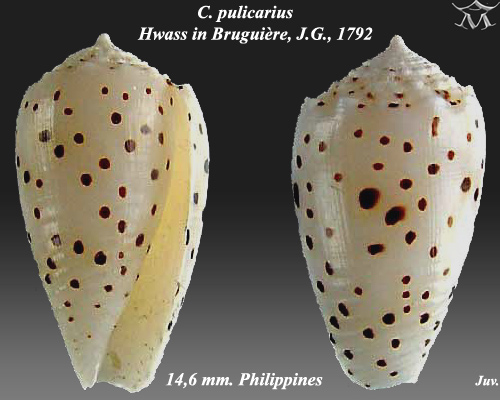
Conus pulicarius Hwass in Bruguière, J.G., 1792 (juv).
