= Conus bahamensis =

Conservation status
- Least Concern (IUCN 3.1)

Scientific classification
- Kingdom: Animalia
- Phylum: Mollusca
- Class: Gastropoda
- Subclass: Caenogastropoda
- Order: Neogastropoda
- Superfamily: Conoidea
- Family: Conidae
- Genus: Conus
- Species: C. bahamensis

Binomial name
- Conus bahamensis Vink & Röckel, 1995

Synonyms
- Conus (Lindaconus) bahamensis Vink & Röckel, 1995 · accepted, alternate representation; Conus caribbaeus auct. non Clench, 1942 (misidentification by Kaicher (1976) and Lozet & Petron (1977).); Lindaconus bahamensis (Vink & Röckel, 1995)

Species of sea snail

Conus bahamensis is a species of sea snail, a marine gastropod mollusk in the family Conidae, the cone snails, cone shells or cones.

These snails are predatory and venomous. They are capable of stinging humans.

== Description ==
The size of the shell reaches 31 mm.

== Distribution ==
This marine species of cone snail occurs in the Caribbean Sea.
