= Iredale =

Iredale is an English family name. It is habitational name from a lost hamlet in Cumbria, so named from Old Norse Íradalr "valley of the Irish".

- Fiona Iredale (born 1967), New Zealand judoka
- Frank Iredale (1867–1926), Australian Test cricketer
- Jack Iredale (born 1996), Australian footballer
- Tim Iredale (born 1972), British television journalist of BBC
- Tom Iredale (1880–1972), English-born ornithologist and malacologist who lived in Australia

== Others ==
- 25690 Iredale, asteroid belt minor planet. It was discovered by the Lincoln Near-Earth Asteroid Research project in Socorro, New Mexico, on January 5, 2000. It is named after Marley Elizabeth Iredale, an American high school student whose earth and planetary science project won first place at the 2009 Intel International Science and Engineering Fair.
- Iredale, Queensland, a rural locality in the Lockyer Valley Region, Australia
- Peter Iredale, built in England four-masted steel barque sailing vessel that ran ashore October 25, 1906, on the Oregon coast en route to the Columbia River.
