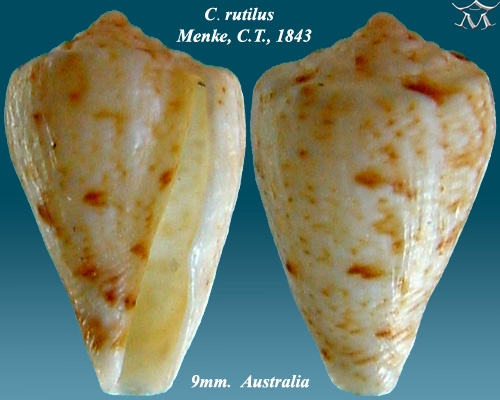
- Apertural and abapertural views of shell of Conasprella rutila (Menke, C.T., 1843)
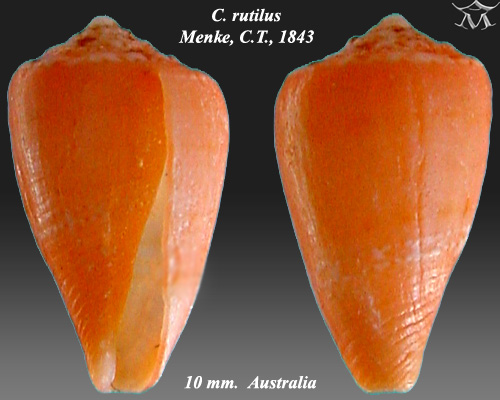

Scientific classification
- Kingdom: Animalia
- Phylum: Mollusca
- Class: Gastropoda
- Subclass: Caenogastropoda
- Order: Neogastropoda
- Superfamily: Conoidea
- Family: Conidae
- Genus: Conasprella
- Species: C. rutila

Binomial name
- Conasprella rutila (Menke, 1843)

Synonyms
- Conasprella (Parviconus) rutila (Menke, 1843) · accepted, alternate representation; Conus macleayana Tenison-Woods, 1877; Conus rutilus Menke, 1843 (original combination); Conus smithi Angas, 1877; Conus tasmanicus Tenison-Woods, 1876; Conus (Stephanoconus) smithi Angas, G.F. 1877; Parviconus rutilus (Menke, 1843)

= Conasprella rutila =

Species of gastropod

Conasprella rutila, common name the burnished cone, is a rare species of sea snail, a marine gastropod mollusk in the family Conidae, the cone snails and their allies.

Like all species within the genus Conasprella, these cone snails are predatory and venomous. They are capable of stinging humans, therefore live animals should be handled carefully or not at all.

== Description ==
The size of the shell varies between 7 mm and 15 mm. Pattern-wise, the C. rutila shell is distinct in its small size and spire shape.

== Distribution ==
This marine species is endemic to Australia, and occurs off New South Wales, South Australia, Tasmania, Victoria and Western Australia. Generally, C. rutila lives among seagrass subtidally.
