= Conus patriceae =

Scientific classification
- Kingdom: Animalia
- Phylum: Mollusca
- Class: Gastropoda
- Subclass: Caenogastropoda
- Order: Neogastropoda
- Superfamily: Conoidea
- Family: Conidae
- Genus: Conus
- Species: C. patriceae

Binomial name
- Conus patriceae Petuch, 1987

Synonyms
- Conus (Lamniconus) patriceae (Petuch & R. F. Myers, 2014) · accepted, alternate representation; Lamniconus patriceae Petuch & R. F. Myers, 2014 (original combination)

Species of sea snail

Conus patriceae is a species of sea snail, a marine gastropod mollusk in the family Conidae, the cone snails, cone shells or cones.

These snails are predatory and venomous. They are capable of stinging humans.

== Description ==
Shell size 35-40 mm.

== Distribution ==
Western Atlantic Ocean: Brazil. This marine species occurs in the Caribbean Sea.
