= Conus tostesi =

Scientific classification
- Kingdom: Animalia
- Phylum: Mollusca
- Class: Gastropoda
- Subclass: Caenogastropoda
- Order: Neogastropoda
- Superfamily: Conoidea
- Family: Conidae
- Genus: Conus
- Species: C. tostesi

Binomial name
- Conus tostesi Petuch, 1986

Synonyms
- Conus (Lamniconus) tostesi Petuch, 1986 · accepted, alternate representation; Lamniconus tostesi (Petuch, 1986); Lamniconus clerii var. tostesi Petuch, 1986

Species of sea snail

Conus tostesi is a species of sea snail, a marine gastropod mollusk in the family Conidae, the cone snails, cone shells or cones.

These snails are predatory and venomous. They are capable of stinging humans.

== Description ==
The size of the shell varies between 22 mm and 40 mm.

== Distribution ==
This marine species occurs off Brazil.
