= Conus bellocqae =

Conservation status
- Data Deficient (IUCN 3.1)

Scientific classification
- Kingdom: Animalia
- Phylum: Mollusca
- Class: Gastropoda
- Subclass: Caenogastropoda
- Order: Neogastropoda
- Superfamily: Conoidea
- Family: Conidae
- Genus: Conus
- Species: C. bellocqae

Binomial name
- Conus bellocqae van Rossum, 1996

Synonyms
- Conus (Monteiroconus) bellocqae van Rossum, 1996 · accepted, alternate representation; Monteiroconus bellocqae (van Rossum, 1996)

Species of sea snail

Conus bellocqae is a species of sea snail, a marine gastropod mollusk in the family Conidae, the cone snails and their allies.

Like all species within the genus Conus, these snails are predatory and venomous. They are capable of stinging humans, therefore live ones should be handled carefully or not at all.

== Description ==
The size of the shell varies between 50 and 79 mm (2.0 and 3.1 in).

== Distribution ==
This species occurs in the Atlantic Ocean off Guinea.
