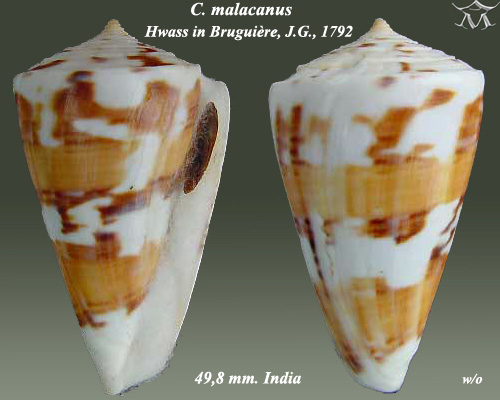
- Apertural and abapertural views of shell of Conus malacanus Hwass in Bruguière, J.G., 1792
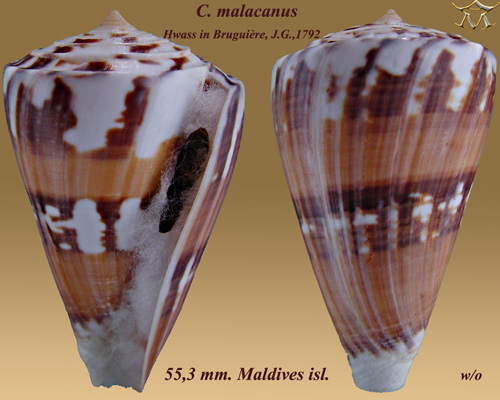

Conservation status
- Least Concern (IUCN 3.1)

Scientific classification
- Kingdom: Animalia
- Phylum: Mollusca
- Class: Gastropoda
- Subclass: Caenogastropoda
- Order: Neogastropoda
- Superfamily: Conoidea
- Family: Conidae
- Genus: Conus
- Species: C. malacanus

Binomial name
- Conus malacanus Hwass in Bruguière, 1792

Synonyms
- Conus (Splinoconus) malacanus Hwass in Bruguière, 1792 · accepted, alternate representation; Conus canaliculatus Dillwyn, 1817; Conus cuneatus G. B. Sowerby II, 1873; Conus subcarinatus G. B. Sowerby II, 1865; Stellaconus malacanus (Hwass in Bruguière, 1792)

= Conus malacanus =

Species of sea snail

Conus malacanus, common name the Malacca cone, is a species of sea snails, marine gastropod molluscs in the family Conidae, the cone snails and their allies.

Like all species within the genus Conus, these snails are predatory and venomous. They are capable of stinging humans, therefore live ones should be handled carefully or not at all.

== Description ==
The size of the shell varies between 40 mm and 83 mm. The shell is channeled, concavely elevated but not reticulated. It is pink-white, with two pale yellow bands and a very few chestnut spots on the body whorl and spire. The aperture is generally rose-tinted.

== Distribution ==
This marine species occurs in Southeast Asia and in the Bay of Bengal.
