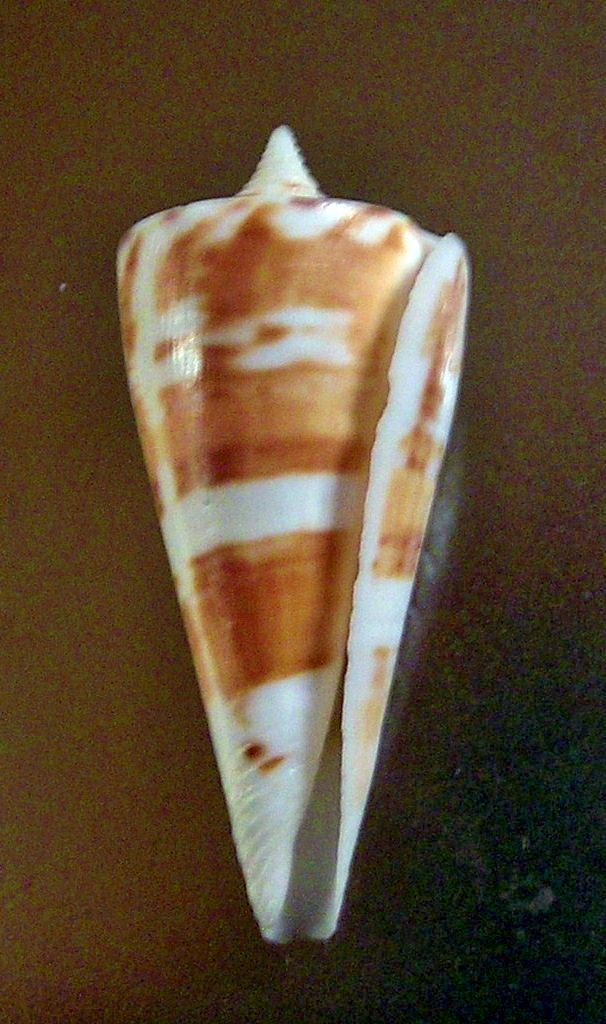
- Apertural view of a shell of Conus bayani

Conservation status
- Least Concern (IUCN 3.1)

Scientific classification
- Kingdom: Animalia
- Phylum: Mollusca
- Class: Gastropoda
- Subclass: Caenogastropoda
- Order: Neogastropoda
- Superfamily: Conoidea
- Family: Conidae
- Genus: Conus
- Species: C. bayani

Binomial name
- Conus bayani Jousseaume, 1872

Synonyms
- Conus (Splinoconus) bayani Jousseaume, 1872 accepted, alternate representation; Stellaconus bayani Jousseaume, 1872

= Conus bayani =

Species of sea snail

Conus bayani, common name the Bayan's cone, is a species of sea snail, a marine gastropod mollusk in the family Conidae, the cone snails and their allies.

Like all species within the genus Conus, these snails are predatory and venomous. They are capable of stinging humans, therefore live ones should be handled carefully or not at all.

== Description ==
The size of an adult shell varies between 45 mm and 70 mm. The white shell has longitudinal streaks and clouds of light chestnut, forming two interrupted broad bands, upon which are vestiges of a few narrow revolving lines of chocolate.

== Distribution ==
This marine species occurs in the Western Indian Ocean.
