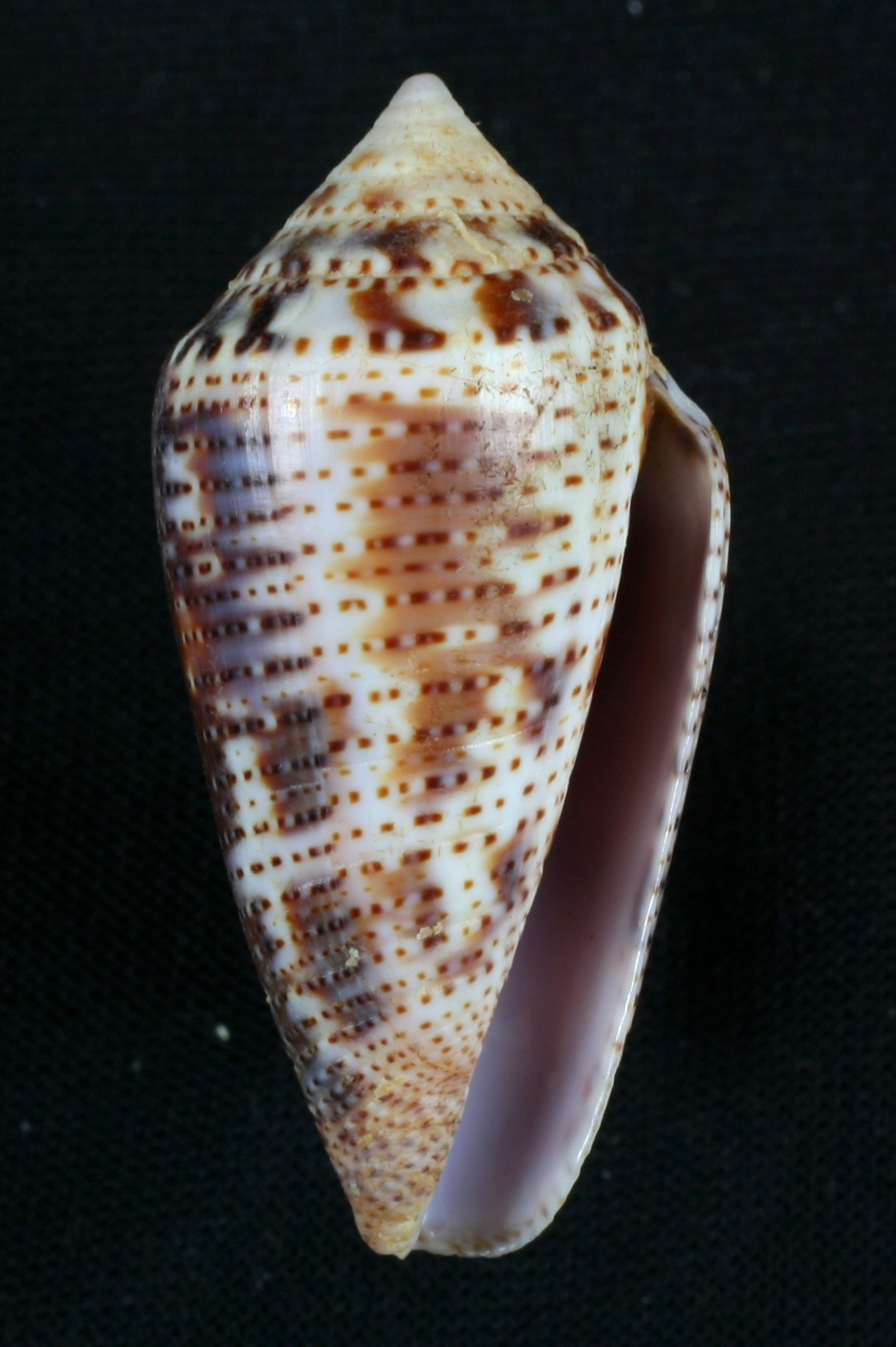
- Apertural view of shell of Conasprella ximenes (Gray, 1839)

Scientific classification
- Kingdom: Animalia
- Phylum: Mollusca
- Class: Gastropoda
- Subclass: Caenogastropoda
- Order: Neogastropoda
- Family: Conidae
- Genus: Conasprella
- Subgenus: Ximeniconus; Emerson & Old, 1962

Type species
- Conus ximenes Gray, 1839

Synonyms
- Conus (Ximeniconus) W. K. Emerson & Old, 1962; Globiconus J. K. Tucker & M. Tenorio, 2009; Jaspidiconus Petuch, 2003; Perplexiconus J. K. Tucker & M. Tenorio, 2009; Ximeniconus W. K. Emerson & Old, 1962; Ximeniconus (Perplexiconus) J. K. Tucker & M. Tenorio, 2009; Ximeniconus (Ximeniconus) W. K. Emerson & Old, 1962

= Conasprella (Ximeniconus) =

Subgenus of gastropods

Ximeniconus is subgenus of sea snails, marine gastropod molluscs in the genus Conasprella, family Conidae.

In the new classification of the family Conidae by Puillandre N., Duda T.F., Meyer C., Olivera B.M. & Bouchet P. (2015), Ximeniconus has become a subgenus of Conasprella: Conasprella (Ximeniconus) Emerson & Old, 1962 represented as Conasprella Thiele, 1929

== Species ==
- Ximeniconus gubernatrix Petuch & Berschauer, 2018 : synonym of Conasprella (Ximeniconus) gubernatrix (Petuch & Berschauer, 2018) represented as Conasprella gubernatrix (Petuch & Berschauer, 2018) (original combination)
- Ximeniconus mahogani (Reeve, 1843) represented as Conasprella mahogani (Reeve, 1843) (alternate representation)
- Ximeniconus ximenes (Gray, 1839): synonym of Conasprella ximenes Gray, 1839
