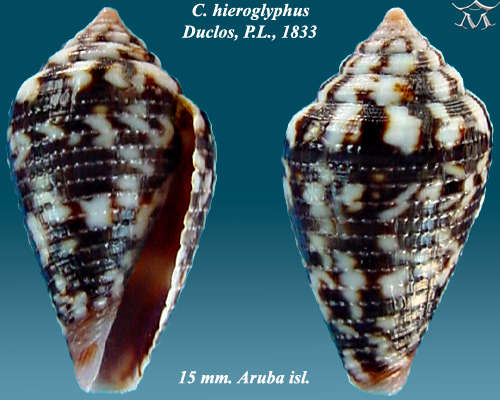
- Apertural and abapertural views of shell of Conus hieroglyphus Duclos, P.L., 1833
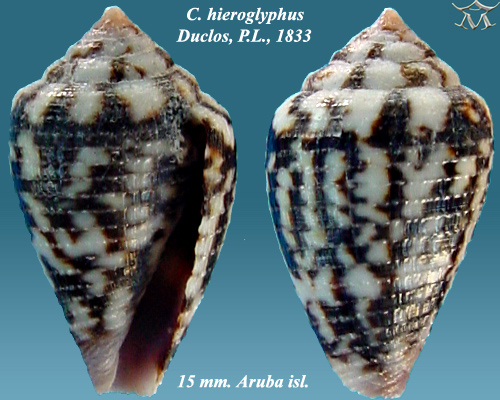

Scientific classification
- Kingdom: Animalia
- Phylum: Mollusca
- Class: Gastropoda
- Subclass: Caenogastropoda
- Order: Neogastropoda
- Superfamily: Conoidea
- Family: Conidae
- Genus: Conus
- Species: C. hieroglyphus

Binomial name
- Conus hieroglyphus Duclos, 1833

Synonyms
- Arubaconus hieroglyphus (Duclos, 1833); Conus (Ductoconus) hieroglyphus Duclos, 1833 · accepted, alternate representation; Conus armillatus C. B. Adams, 1850; Gladioconus hieroglyphus (Duclos, 1833)

= Conus hieroglyphus =

Species of sea snail

Conus hieroglyphus, common name the hieroglyphic cone, is a species of sea snail, a marine gastropod mollusk in the family Conidae, the cone snails and their allies.

Like all species within the genus Conus, these snails are predatory and venomous. They are capable of stinging humans, therefore live ones should be handled carefully or not at all.

== Distribution ==
This marine species occurs off Aruba, the Netherlands Antilles.

== Description ==
The maximum recorded shell length is 23 mm. The white shell shows revolving series of spots and irregular or cloud-like markings of orange, chestnut or chocolate, often forming interrupted bands. The base is grooved. The spire has a single broad sulcus.

== Habitat ==
Minimum recorded depth is 6 m. Maximum recorded depth is 6 m.
