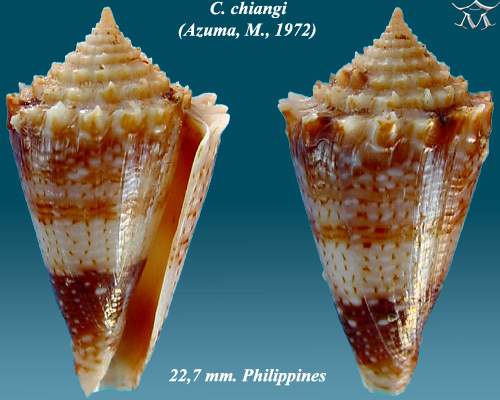
- Apertural and abapertural views of shell of Conus chiangi (Azuma, M., 1972)
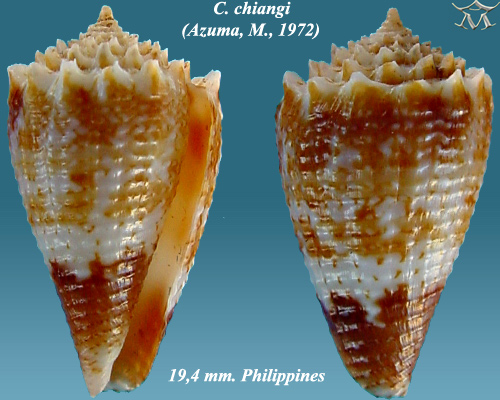

Conservation status
- Least Concern (IUCN 3.1)

Scientific classification
- Kingdom: Animalia
- Phylum: Mollusca
- Class: Gastropoda
- Subclass: Caenogastropoda
- Order: Neogastropoda
- Superfamily: Conoidea
- Family: Conidae
- Genus: Conus
- Species: C. chiangi

Binomial name
- Conus chiangi (Azuma, 1972)

Synonyms
- Conus (Stephanoconus) chiangi (Azuma, 1972) accepted, alternate representation; Cornutoconus lamellatus Suzuki, 1972; Taranteconus chiangi Azuma, 1972

= Conus chiangi =

Species of sea snail

Conus chiangi, common name Chiang's cone, is a species of sea snail, a marine gastropod mollusk in the family Conidae, the cone snails and their allies.

Like all species within the genus Conus, these snails are predatory and venomous. They are capable of stinging humans, therefore live ones should be handled carefully or not at all.

== Description ==
The size of the shell varies between 14 mm and 25 mm.

== Distribution ==
This marine species occurs off Taiwan, the Philippines and Southern Japan; also off Vanuatu.

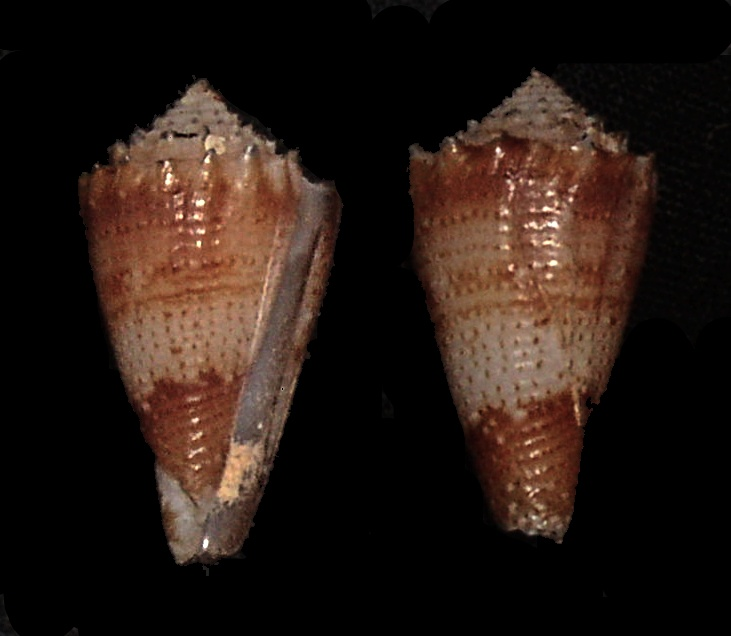
Conus chiangi
