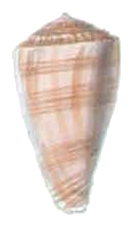
- Drawing of the shell of Conus ambiguus from its original type description.

Conservation status
- Least Concern (IUCN 3.1)

Scientific classification
- Kingdom: Animalia
- Phylum: Mollusca
- Class: Gastropoda
- Subclass: Caenogastropoda
- Order: Neogastropoda
- Superfamily: Conoidea
- Family: Conidae
- Genus: Conus
- Species: C. ambiguus

Binomial name
- Conus ambiguus Reeve, 1844

Synonyms
- Conus (Monteiroconus) ambiguus Reeve, 1844 accepted, alternate representation; Conus griseus Kiener, 1845; Conus miser Boivin, 1864; Leptoconus gernanti Petuch, 1975; Monteiroconus ambiguus (Reeve, 1844)

= Conus ambiguus =

Species of sea snail

Conus ambiguus, common name the doubtful cone, is a species of sea snail, a marine gastropod mollusk in the family Conidae, the cone snails and their allies.

Like all species within the genus Conus, these snails are predatory and venomous. They are capable of stinging humans, therefore live ones should be handled carefully or not at all.

== Description ==
Conus ambiguus was originally discovered and described in both identical Latin and English language texts by Lovell Augustus Reeve in 1844.

Reeve's type description reads as follows:

The doubtful cone. Shell turbinated, smooth, ridged

towards the base, rather obsoletely engraved with very fine, festooned, longitudinal lines; white, palely stained with light brown; spire obtusely convex, slightly canaliculated, ornamented with

arched brownish spots; apex raised and pointed.

The shell of Conus ambiguus is whitish, with obscure, light brown bands, and longitudinal streaks. The spire is ornamented with arched brownish spots.

The height of the shell is 1.5 inches (38 mm).

Dimensions of the shell of type specimen is 39 x 22 mm. The type specimen is stored in Zoölogisch Museum Amsterdam (Zoological Museum of the University of Amsterdam).

== Distribution ==
The type locality was not specified by Reeve. This species occurs in the Atlantic Ocean off West Africa (Senegal, Guinea Bissau) and Angola.
