= Conus carcellesi =

Scientific classification
- Kingdom: Animalia
- Phylum: Mollusca
- Class: Gastropoda
- Subclass: Caenogastropoda
- Order: Neogastropoda
- Superfamily: Conoidea
- Family: Conidae
- Genus: Conus
- Species: C. carcellesi

Binomial name
- Conus carcellesi Martins, 1945

Synonyms
- Conus (Lamniconus) carcellesi Martins, 1945 · accepted, alternate representation; Conus iheringi Frenguelli, 1946; Conus lemniscatus carcellesi Martins, 1945; Lamniconus carcellesi (Martins, 1945); Lamniconus lemniscatus carcellesi (Martins, 1945)

Species of sea snail

Conus carcellesi is a species of sea snail, a marine gastropod mollusk in the family Conidae, the cone snails, cone shells or cones.

These snails are predatory and venomous. They are capable of stinging humans.

== Description ==
The size of the shell varies between 29 mm and 50 mm.

== Distribution ==
This marine species occurs off Argentina.
