= Vermivore =

Animals that eats worms

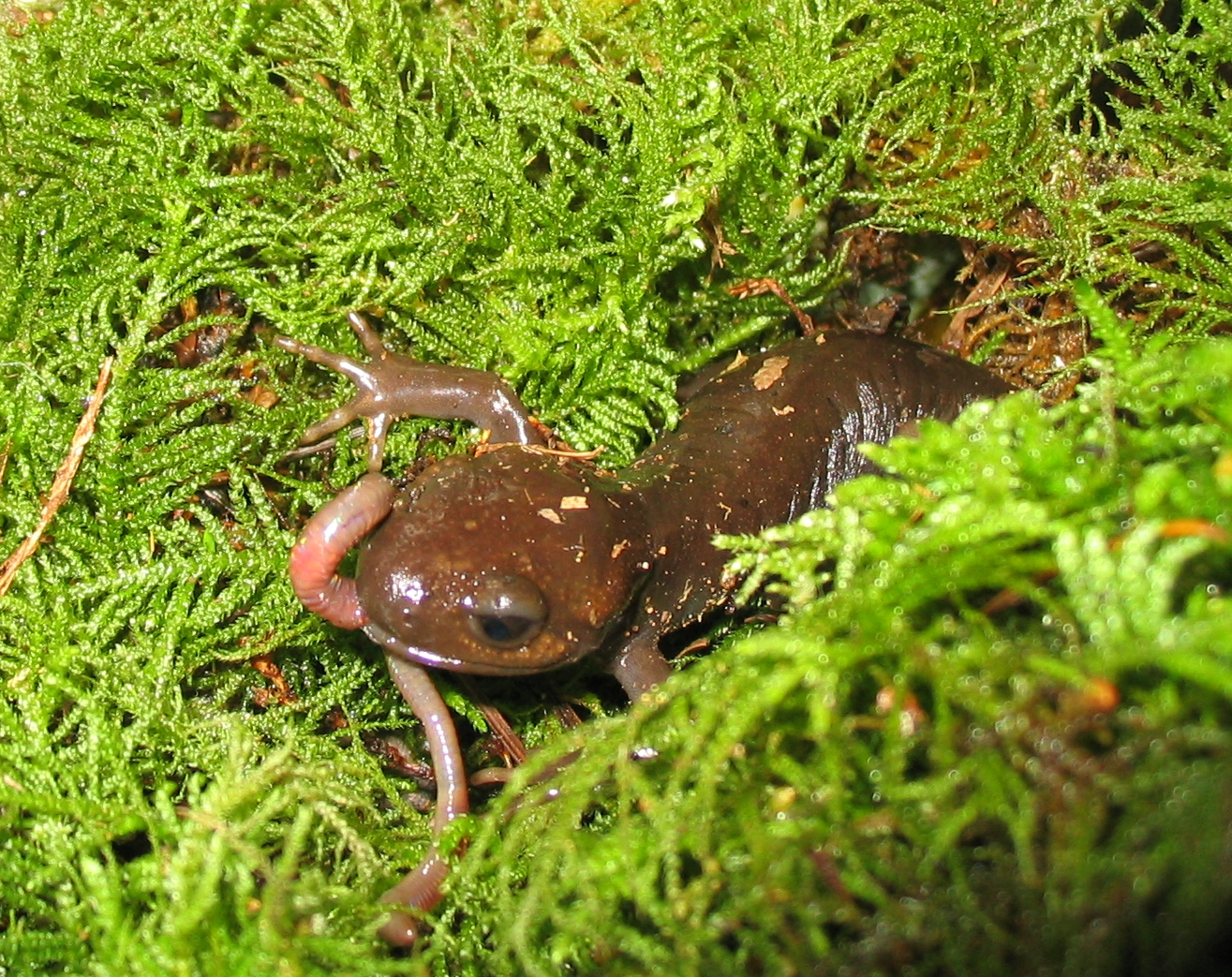
Pacific brown salamander eating a worm

Vermivore (from Latin vermi, meaning "worm" and vorare, "to devour") is a zoological term for animals that primarily eat worms (including annelids, nematodes, and other worm-like animals). Animals with such a diet are known to be vermivorous. Some definitions are less exclusive with respect to the diet, but limit the definition to particular animals, e.g. "Feeding on worms or insect vermin. Used of a bird."

An entire genus of New World warblers has been given the name Vermivora.

One vermivore that may feed exclusively on worms is Paucidentomys vermidax, a rodent species of a type commonly known as shrew rats which was discovered in 2011 in Indonesia. The name, which can be translated as "worm-eating, few-toothed mouse", refers to the fact that they have only four teeth and may live exclusively on a diet of earthworms. This reduced dentition in vermivorous mammals is said to be due to relaxed selectional pressure on dental occlusion.

== Process ==
The process of getting worms and using them as a source of nutrients, whether by animals (in nature) or humans (in food systems or composting), involves several biological and/or ecological steps. Here's a breakdown depending on the context:

1. Detection: Vermivores use their senses, like smell, vibration detection, or sight, to locate worms underground or above ground.
2. Extraction: Vermivores will dig or peck their way to the worm or what til they come to the surface(usually at night or in the rain). Then they retrieve it.
3. Ingestion: The worm is consumed whole or in parts.
4. Digestion and Absorption: Worms are high in protein, amino acids, iron, and moisture. Vermivor’s digestive system breaks the worm down into usable nutrients, absorbed into the bloodstream for energy and growth.

== Examples of vermivores ==
- American robin
- Americobdella leeches
- Ants
- Anurids (frogs and toads)
- Bluebirds
- Burrowing owls
- Carabids (ground beetles)
- Centipedes
- Conus sea snails
- Corvids (crows, ravens, etc.)
- Galliformes (incl. chickens, junglefowl, peafowl, pheasants, turkeys, quail)
- Hedgehogs
- Icterids (New-World blackbirds)
- Jaspidiconus sea snails
- Killdeer
- Kiwi (bird)
- Lizards
- Long-beaked echidna
- Moles
- Nematodes
- Newts
- Nuthatches
- Platypus
- Plovers
- Rough green snake
- Salamanders
- Smooth green snake
- Shrews
- Starlings
- Tuatara
- Turtles (freshwater and terrestrial species)
- Woodcock
- Woodpeckers
- Wormsnake
- Wrens

== See also ==
- Carnivore
- Frugivore
- Herbivore
- Insectivore
- List of feeding behaviours
- Nectarivore
- Omnivore
