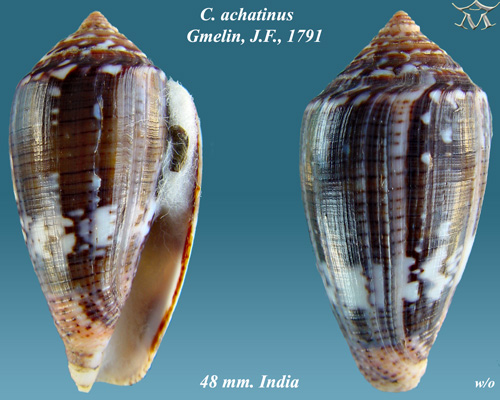
- Apertural and abapertural views of shell of Conus achatinus (Gmelin, 1791)

Scientific classification
- Kingdom: Animalia
- Phylum: Mollusca
- Class: Gastropoda
- Subclass: Caenogastropoda
- Order: Neogastropoda
- Superfamily: Conoidea
- Family: Conidae
- Genus: Pionoconus; Mörch, 1852

Type species
- Conus magus Linnaeus, 1758

Synonyms
- Conus (Pionoconus) Mörch, 1852; Hermes (Heroconus) da Motta, 1991; Heroconus da Motta, 1991; Socioconus da Motta, 1991; Strioconus Thiele, 1929

= Pionoconus =

Subgenus of gastropods

Pionoconus is a subgenus of sea snails, marine gastropod mollusks in the genus Conus, family Conidae, the cone snails and their allies.

In the latest classification of the family Conidae by Puillandre N., Duda T.F., Meyer C., Olivera B.M. & Bouchet P. (2015), Pionoconus has become a subgenus of Conus as Conus (Pionoconus) da Motta, 1991 (type species: Conus magus Linnaeus, 1758) : synonym of Conus Linnaeus, 1758

== Species ==
The following species were brought into synonymy:

- Pionoconus achatinus (Gmelin, 1791) : synonym of Conus achatinus Gmelin, 1791 (alternate representation)
- Pionoconus arafurensis Monnier, Limpalaër & Robin, 2013: synonym of Conus (Pionoconus) arafurensis (Monnier, Limpalaër & Robin, 2013) : synonym of Conus arafurensis (Monnier, Limpalaër & Robin, 2013) (alternate representation)
- Pionoconus atimovatae Bozzetti, 2012: synonym of Conus (Pionoconus) atimovatae (Bozzetti, 2012) : synonym of Conus atimovatae (Bozzetti, 2012) (alternate representation)
- Pionoconus aurisiacus (Linnaeus, 1758) : synonym of Conus aurisiacus Linnaeus, 1758 (alternate representation)
- Pionoconus barbara (Brazier, 1898): synonym of Conus (Pionoconus) barbara Brazier, 1898 : synonym of Conus barbara Brazier, 1898 (alternate representation)
- Pionoconus barthelemyi (Bernardi, 1861) : synonym of Conus barthelemyi Bernardi, 1861 (alternate representation)
- Pionoconus boutetorum (Richard & Rabiller, 2013): synonym of Conus (Pionoconus) boutetorum Richard & Rabiller, 2013 : synonym of Conus boutetorum Richard & Rabiller, 2013 (alternate representation)
- Pionoconus catus (Hwass in Bruguière, 1792) : synonym of Conus catus Hwass in Bruguière, 1792 (alternate representation)
- Pionoconus circumcisus (Born, 1778) : synonym of Conus circumcisus Born, 1778 (alternate representation)
- Pionoconus consors (G.B. Sowerby I, 1833): synonym of Conus consors G. B. Sowerby I, 1833 (alternate representation)
- Pionoconus fischoederi (Röckel & da Motta, 1983) : synonym of Conus fischoederi Röckel & da Motta, 1983 (alternate representation)
- Pionoconus fulmen (Reeve, 1843) : synonym of Conus fulmen Reeve, 1843 (alternate representation)
- Pionoconus gauguini (Richard & Salvat, 1973) : synonym of Conus gauguini Richard & Salvat, 1973 (alternate representation)
- Pionoconus gubernator (Hwass in Bruguière, 1792) : synonym of Conus gubernator Hwass in Bruguière, 1792 (alternate representation)
- Pionoconus koukae Monnier, Limpalaër & Robin, 2013: synonym of Conus (Pionoconus) koukae (Monnier, Limpalaër & Robin, 2013) : synonym of Conus koukae (Monnier, Limpalaër & Robin, 2013) (alternate representation)
- Pionoconus leobottonii (Lorenz, 2006) : synonym of Conus leobottonii Lorenz, 2006 (alternate representation)
- Pionoconus magus (Linnaeus, 1758) : synonym of Conus magus Linnaeus, 1758 (alternate representation)
- Pionoconus marysae Lorenz, 2019: synonym of Conus (Pionoconus) marysae (Lorenz, 2019) represented as Conus marysae (Lorenz, 2019) (basionym)
- Pionoconus mascarenensis Monnier & Limpalaër, 2019: synonym of Conus (Pionoconus) mascarenensis (Monnier & Limpalaër, 2019) represented as Conus mascarenensis (Monnier & Limpalaër, 2019)
- Pionoconus monachus (Linnaeus, 1758) : synonym of Conus monachus Linnaeus, 1758 (alternate representation)
- Pionoconus morrisoni (G. Raybaudi Massilia, 1991): synonym of Conus (Pionoconus) morrisoni G. Raybaudi Massilia, 1991 : synonym of Conus morrisoni G. Raybaudi Massilia, 1991 (alternate representation)
- Pionoconus nigromaculatus (Röckel & Moolenbeek, 1992): synonym of Conus (Pionoconus) nigromaculatus Röckel & Moolenbeek, 1992 : synonym of Conus nigromaculatus Röckel & Moolenbeek, 1992 (alternate representation)
- Pionoconus nigropunctatus (G. B. Sowerby II, 1858): synonym of Conus (Pionoconus) nigropunctatus G. B. Sowerby II, 1858 : synonym of Conus nigropunctatus G. B. Sowerby II, 1858 (alternate representation)
- Pionoconus robini Limpalaër & Monnier, 2012: synonym of Conus (Pionoconus) robini (Limpalaër & Monnier, 2012) : synonym of Conus robini (Limpalaër & Monnier, 2012) (alternate representation)
- Pionoconus rouxi Monnier, Limpalaër & Robin, 2013: synonym of Conus (Pionoconus) rouxi (Monnier, Limpalaër & Robin, 2013) : synonym of Conus rouxi (Monnier, Limpalaër & Robin, 2013) (alternate representation)
- Pionoconus simonis (Bozzetti, 2010): synonym of Conus striolatus Kiener, 1848
- Pionoconus striatus (Linnaeus, 1758) : synonym of Conus striatus Linnaeus, 1758 (alternate representation)
- Pionoconus striolatus (Kiener, 1845) : synonym of Conus striolatus Kiener, 1845 (alternate representation)
- Pionoconus vinctus (A. Adams, 1855) : synonym of Conus vinctus A. Adams, 1855 itself a synonym of Conus monachus Linnaeus, 1758
