= Auger cone =

Auger Cone may refer to:

- Conus augur
- Conus circumcisus
