= Jean Guillaume Bruguière =

French physician, zoologist and diplomat

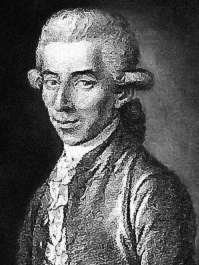
- Born: 19 July 1749; Montpellier, France
- Died: 3 October 1798 (aged 49); Ancona, Italy
- Known for: Histoire Naturelle des Vers. Vol. 1 (1792)
- Scientific career
- Fields: Molluscs (gastropods)
- Author abbrev. (zoology): Bruguière

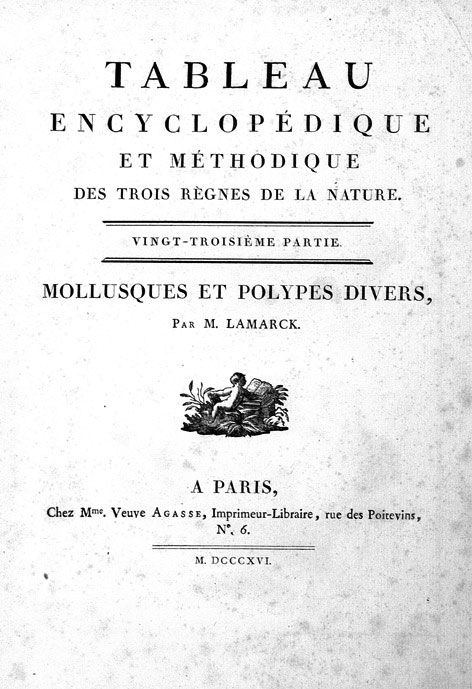
Cover of the book Tableau Encyclopédique et Methodique des Trois Règnes de la Nature

Jean Guillaume Bruguière (19 July 1749 – 3 October 1798) was a French physician, zoologist and diplomat.

== Biography ==
Bruguière was born in Montpellier, France, on 19 July 1749. He was a doctor, connected to the University of Montpellier. He was interested in invertebrates, mostly snails (gastropods).

He accompanied the explorer Kerguelen-Trémarec on his first voyage to the Antarctic in 1773. In 1790 he accompanied the entomologist Olivier on an expedition to Persia, but his poor health didn't allow him to continue. In 1792, although he was ill, he visited the Greek archipelago and the Middle East, together with the entomologist Guillaume-Antoine Olivier. He was asked by the French Directoire to try to set up a Franco-Persian alliance, but was unsuccessful, lacking the training of a diplomat. He died on the voyage back.

He described several taxa in his book Tableau Encyclopédique et Méthodique des trois Règnes de la Nature: vers, coquilles, mollusques et polypes divers which appeared in three volumes in 1827, long after he had died. He also wrote Histoire Naturelle des Vers. Vol. 1 (1792) but he had to stop at the letter "C". Christian Hee Hwass continued his work and wrote most of it.

He died in Ancona in October 1798 (and not in 1799, as mentioned in some sources; there was a discrepancy due to the French revolutionary calendar).

He was mainly interested in molluscs and other invertebrates, as can be seen in the following list of the taxa he named.

== Authority ==
He named more than 140 marine genera or species, among them:

Genera

- Anodontites, Bruguière, 1792 (mollusc)
- Cerithium, Bruguière, 1789 (mollusc)
- Cerithium subg. Cerithium, Bruguière, 1789 (mollusc)
- Corbula, Bruguière, 1792 (mollusc)
- Lima, Bruguière, 1797 (mollusc)
- Lingula, Bruguière, 1791 (brachiopod)
- Lucina, Bruguière, 1797 (mollusc)
- Oliva, Bruguière, 1789 (mollusc)
- Orthoceras, Bruguière, 1789 (mollusc)
- Ovula, Bruguière, 1789 (mollusc)
- Terebra, Bruguière, 1789 (mollusc)

Species

- Acanthopleura spinosa, Bruguière, 1792 (mollusc)
- Anadara ovalis, Bruguière, 1789 (mollusc)
- Anodontites crispata, Bruguière, 1792 (mollusc)
- Arca imbricata, Bruguière, 1789 (mollusc)
- Balanus crenatus, Bruguière (crustacean)
- Balanus perforatus, Bruguière (crustacean)
- Batillaria zonalis, Bruguière, 1792 (mollusc)
- Beroe ovata, Bruguière, 1789 (Ctenophora)
- Bulla striata, Bruguière, 1789 (mollusc)
- Bullia miran, Bruguière, 1789 (mollusc)
- Cardita ajar, Bruguière, 1792 (mollusc)
- Cardium ringens, Bruguière, 1789 (mollusc)
- Cassidula aurisfelis, Bruguière, 1789 (mollusc)
- Cerithium eburneum, Bruguière, 1792 (mollusc)
- Cerithium vulgatum, Bruguière (mollusc)
- Chaetopleura spinosa, Bruguière, 1792 (mollusc)
- Concholepas concholepas, Bruguière, 1792 (mollusc)
- Chondrina avenacea, Bruguière, 1792 (mollusc)
- Conus arenatus, Hwass in Bruguière, 1792 (mollusc)
- Conus catus, Hwass in Bruguière, 1792 (mollusc)
- Conus gubernator, Hwass in Bruguière, 1792 (mollusc)
- Conus pulcher siamensis, Hwass in Bruguière, 1792 (mollusc)
- Diplodon granosus, Bruguière, 1792 (mollusc)
- Gourmya vulgata, Bruguière, 1789 (mollusc)
- Lingula anatina, Lamarck, 1801 (brachiopod)
- Micromelo undata, Bruguière, 1792 (mollusc)
- Partula otaheitana, Bruguière, 1792 (mollusc)
- Perrona nifat, Bruguière, 1792 (mollusc)
- Placenta placuna, Bruguière, 1792 (mollusc)
- Retusa truncatula, Bruguière, 1792 (mollusc)
- Scapharca inaequivalvis, Bruguière (mollusc)
- Serripes groenlandicus, Bruguière, 1789 (mollusc)
- Solatopupa similis, Bruguière, 1792 (mollusc)
- Sphyradium doliolum, Bruguière, 1792 (mollusc)
- Subulina octona, Bruguière, 1792 (mollusc)
- Terebralia sulcata, Bruguière, 1792 (mollusc)

The genus Bruguiera (mangrove trees from the family Rhizophoraceae) was named by Jean-Baptiste Lamarck in his honor. Bruguière Peak in Antarctica is named after Jean Guillaume Bruguière.

== See also ==
- European and American voyages of scientific exploration
