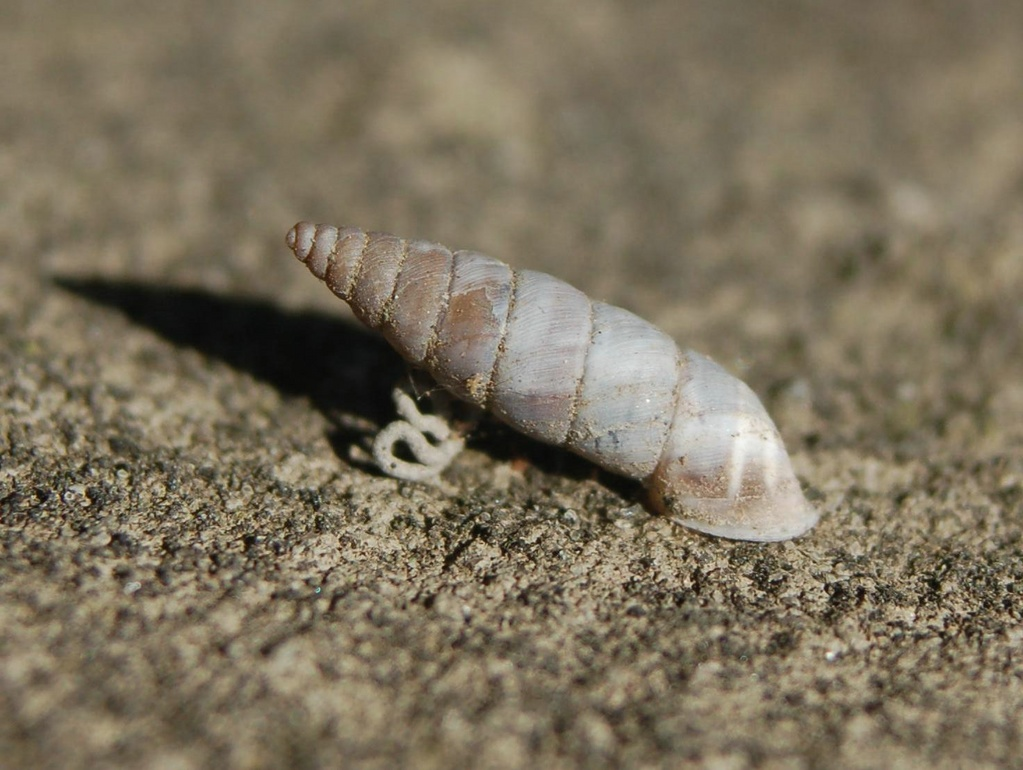
- A live but retracted individual of Solatopupa juliana

Conservation status
- Least Concern (IUCN 3.1)

Scientific classification
- Kingdom: Animalia
- Phylum: Mollusca
- Class: Gastropoda
- Order: Stylommatophora
- Family: Chondrinidae
- Genus: Solatopupa
- Species: S. juliana

Binomial name
- Solatopupa juliana (Issel, 1866)

= Solatopupa juliana =

Species of gastropod

Solatopupa juliana is a species of air-breathing land snail, a terrestrial pulmonate gastropod mollusk in the family Chondrinidae.

== Distribution ==
This species is present in the Italian mainland, with a peri-Tyrrhenian distribution, meaning around the Tyrrhenian Sea.

== Description ==
The shell size reaches 10–15 millimetres (0.39–0.59 in) in length.
