= Louis Pierre Vieillot =

French ornithologist

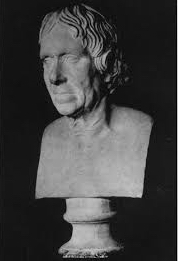
- Bust by unknown sculptor
- Born: 10 May 1748; Yvetot, Seine-Maritime, France
- Died: 24 August 1830 (aged 82); Sotteville-lès-Rouen, Seine-Maritime, France
- Known for: Analyse d'une nouvelle Ornithologie Elémentaire (1816)
- Scientific career
- Fields: Ornithology
- Workplaces: Saint-Domingue, Hispaniola (now Haiti)
- Author abbrev. (zoology): Vieillot

Louis Pierre Vieillot (French pronunciation: [lwi pjɛʁ vjɛjo]; 10 May 1748 – 24 August 1830) was a French ornithologist. (Note: Vieillot's year and place of death are frequently given as "1831 in Rouen". This error goes back to René Lessons' obituary from 1831. However, the sentence M. Vieillot, le doyen des ornithologistes, vient de mourir à Rouen. says nothing about the actual year of death. The official record of his death clearly shows 24 August 1830 at Sotteville-lès-Rouen. The entry is from 25 August, but according to the entry, he died a day earlier at 5 o'clock in the afternoon. Louis Jean Pierre Vieillot is also often found as a name. This is probably due to Howard Saunders, who may have conflated him with Jean Baptiste Audebert in the preface to the 1883 reprint of Vieillot's Analyse d'une nouvelle ornithologie élémentaire, the earliest source in which it has been found.)

Vieillot is the author of the first scientific descriptions and Linnaean names of a number of birds, including species he collected himself in the West Indies, as well as North American and South American species discovered but not formally named by Félix de Azara and his translator Sonnini de Manoncourt. He was among the first ornithologists to study changes in plumage and one of the first to study live birds. At least 88 of the genera erected by Vieillot are still in use.

== Biography ==
Vieillot was born in Yvetot. He represented his family's business interests in Saint-Domingue (Haiti) on Hispaniola, but fled to the United States during the Haitian rebellions that followed the French Revolution. On Buffon's advice, he collected material for the Histoire naturelle des oiseaux de l'Amérique Septentrionale, the first two volumes of which were published in France beginning in 1807.

Vieillot returned to France for the last time in 1798, where the position created for him at the Bulletin des Lois left him sufficient leisure to continue his natural history studies. Following the death of Jean Baptiste Audebert, Vieillot saw the two parts of the "Oiseaux dorés" through to completion in 1802; his own Histoire naturelle des plus beaux oiseaux chanteurs de la zone torride appeared in 1806.

Vieillot's Analyse d'une nouvelle Ornithologie Elémentaire (1816) set out a new system of ornithological classification, which he applied with slight modifications in his contributions to the Nouveau dictionnaire d'histoire naturelle (1816–1819). Bitter rivalries existed between the leading ornithologists, and the classification introduced by Vieillot was strongly criticized by Coenraad Temminck in a pamphlet published in 1817. In 1820, Vieillot undertook the continuation of the Tableau encyclopédique et méthodique, commenced by Pierre Joseph Bonnaterre in 1790. He also published an Ornithologie française (1823–1830).

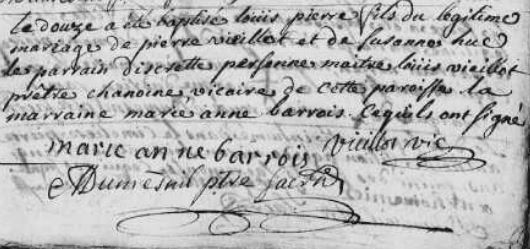
Baptism of Louis Pierre Vieillot on 12 May 1748 in Yvetot

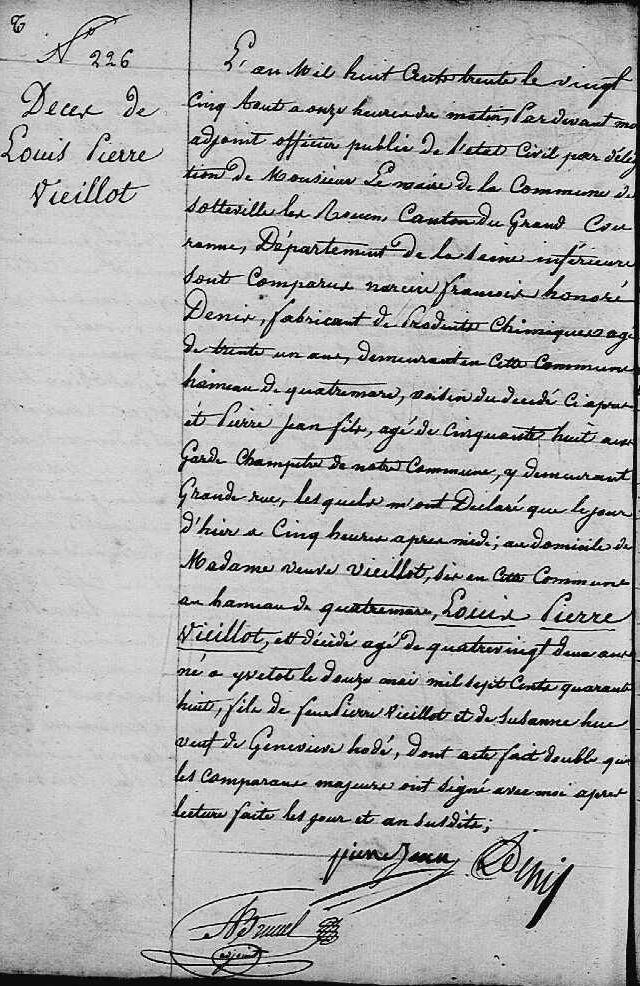
Death entry for Louis Pierre Vieillot on 24 August 1830 in Sotteville-lès-Rouen

Toward the end of his life, Vieillot became blind. He was granted a government pension in his final year, but died in relative poverty.

Vieillot is now considered to be the authority for the scientific names of 88 genera and 402 species. Only Carl Linnaeus, Philip Sclater, and John Gould are considered to be the authority for more species. Vieillot is commemorated in the scientific names of three birds: Lybius vieilloti (Vieillot's barbet), Coccyzus vieilloti (Puerto Rican lizard cuckoo), and Sphecotheres vieilloti (Australasian figbird).

Some believe that Leach's storm petrel should be named "Vieillot's storm petrel" since he was the first to obtain a specimen of the species and to describe it. He did this in the New Dictionary of Natural History, published in 1817. He described the type location as the shores of Picardy, "se tient sur l"Ocean."

== Bibliography ==
- Histoire naturelle des plus beaux oiseaux chanteurs de la zone torride. Dufour, Paris 1805.
- Histoire naturelle des oiseaux de l'Amérique septentrionale. Desray, Paris 1807–1808.
- Analyse d'une nouvelle ornithologie élémentaire. d'Éterville, Paris 1816.
- Mémoire pour servir à l'histoire des oiseaux d'Europe. Turin 1816.
- Ornithologie. Lanoe, Paris 1818.
- Faune française ou Histoire naturelle, générale et particulière des animaux qui se trouvent en France. Le Vrault & Rapet, Paris, Strasbourg, Bruxelles, 1820–1830.
- La galerie des oiseaux du cabinet d'histoire naturelle du jardin du roi. Aillard & Constant-Chantpie, Paris 1822–1825.
- Ornithologie française ou Histoire naturelle, générale et particulière des oiseaux de France. Pelicier, Paris 1830.
