= Cerithium eburneum =

Scientific classification
- Kingdom: Animalia
- Phylum: Mollusca
- Class: Gastropoda
- Subclass: Caenogastropoda
- Order: incertae sedis
- Family: Cerithiidae
- Genus: Cerithium
- Species: C. eburneum

Binomial name
- Cerithium eburneum Bruguière, 1792

Synonyms
- Cerithium algicola C.B. Adams, 1845; Cerithium eburneum aliceae Petuch, 1987; Cerithium eburneum f. minor Mörch, 1876; Cerithium fenestratum G.B. Sowerby II, 1855; Cerithium novaehiberniae A. Adams, 1855; Cerithium planispiratum G.B. Sowerby II, 1855; Cerithium pulicarium Philippi, 1848; Thericium lymani Pilsbry, 1949

Species of gastropod

Cerithium eburneum Bruguière, 1792

Cerithium eburneum is a species of sea snail, a marine gastropod mollusk in the family Cerithiidae.

== Distribution ==
The distribution of Cerithium eburneum includes the Western Central Atlantic.

- North America
- USA

== Description ==
The maximum recorded shell length is 43 mm.

== Habitat ==
Minimum recorded depth is 0 m. Maximum recorded depth is 18 m.
