= Tableau encyclopédique et méthodique =

Illustrated encyclopedia of plants, animals and minerals

The Tableau encyclopédique et méthodique des trois regnes de la nature was an illustrated encyclopedia of plants, animals and minerals, notable for including the first scientific descriptions of many species, and for its attractive engravings. It was published in Paris by Charles Joseph Panckoucke, from 1788 on. Although its several volumes can be considered a part of the greater Encyclopédie méthodique, they were titled and issued separately.

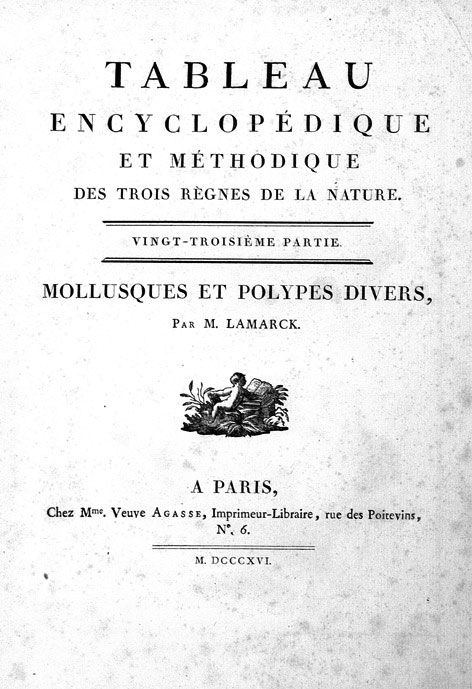
front page

Contributors:

- Jean-Baptiste Lamarck (plants, taxonomy)
- Pierre Joseph Bonnaterre (cetaceans, mammals, birds, reptiles, amphibians, fish, insects)
- Louis Pierre Vieillot (birds, second volume)
- Jean Guillaume Bruguière (invertebrates)
