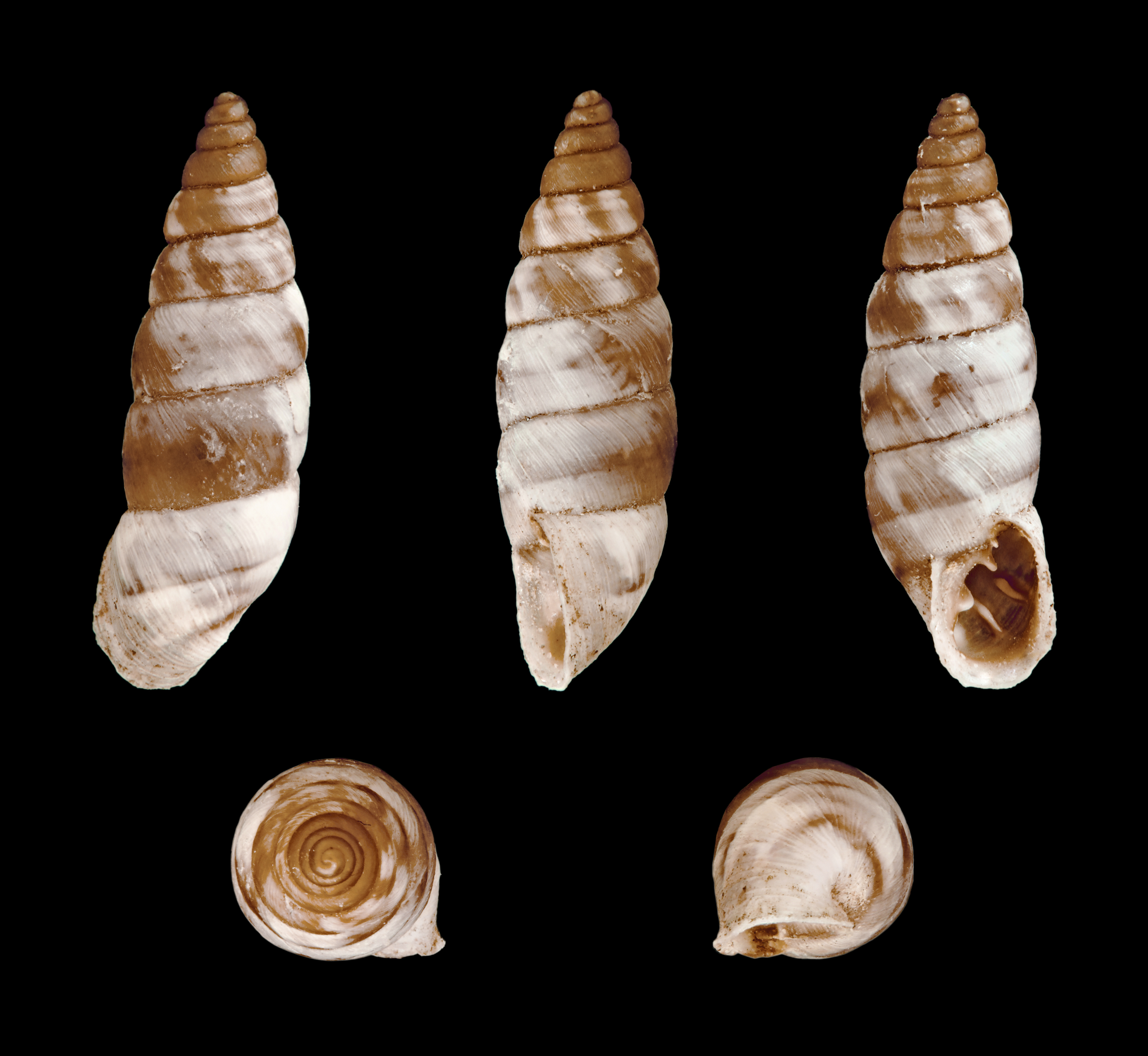

Scientific classification
- Kingdom: Animalia
- Phylum: Mollusca
- Class: Gastropoda
- Order: Stylommatophora
- Family: Chondrinidae
- Genus: Solatopupa
- Species: S. similis

Binomial name
- Solatopupa similis (Bruguière, 1792)

= Solatopupa similis =

Species of gastropod

Solatopupa similis is a species of gastropods belonging to the family Chondrinidae.

The species is found in Central and Southern Europe.
