= Solatopupa psarolena =

Conservation status
- Vulnerable (IUCN 3.1)

Scientific classification
- Kingdom: Animalia
- Phylum: Mollusca
- Class: Gastropoda
- Order: Stylommatophora
- Family: Chondrinidae
- Genus: Solatopupa
- Species: S. psarolena

Binomial name
- Solatopupa psarolena (Bourguignat, 1859)

Synonyms
- Bulimus psarolenus Bourguignat, 1858

Species of gastropod

Solatopupa psarolena is a species of air-breathing land snail, a terrestrial pulmonate gastropod mollusk in the family Chondrinidae. This species is found in France and Italy.
