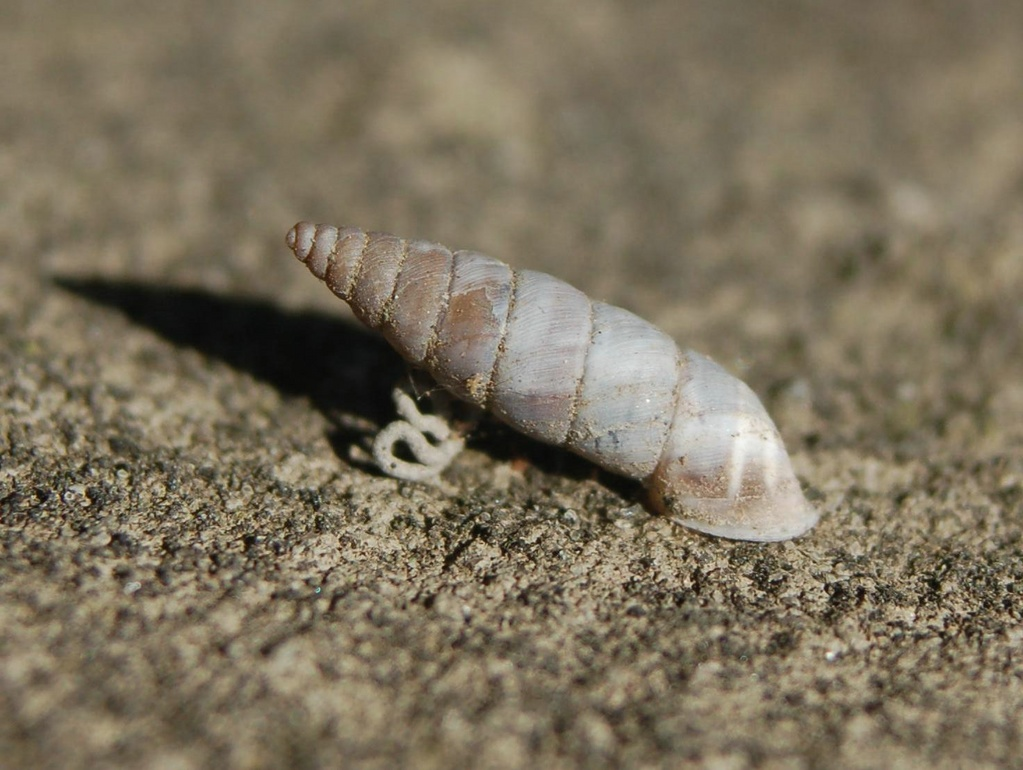
- A live but retracted individual of Solatopupa juliana

Scientific classification
- Kingdom: Animalia
- Phylum: Mollusca
- Class: Gastropoda
- Order: Stylommatophora
- Infraorder: Pupilloidei
- Superfamily: Pupilloidea
- Family: Chondrinidae
- Genus: Solatopupa; Pilsbry, 1917

Type species
- Bulimus similis Bruguière, 1792

Synonyms
- Chondrina (Solatopupa) Pilsbry, 1917

= Solatopupa =

Genus of gastropods

Solatopupa is a genus of air-breathing land snails, terrestrial pulmonate gastropod mollusks in the subfamily Granariinae of the family Chondrinidae.

== Distribution ==
The distribution the genus Solatopupa is peri-Tyrrhenian, i.e. around the Tyrrhenian Sea (the part of the Mediterranean Sea that is between Italy, Sicily and Sardinia.

== Species ==
There are six species in the genus Solatopupa:

- Solatopupa cianensis (Caziot, 1910)
- Solatopupa guidoni (Caziot, 1904)
- Solatopupa juliana (Issel, 1866)
- Solatopupa pallida (Rossmässler, 1842)
- Solatopupa psarolena (Bourguignat, 1859)
- Solatopupa similis (Bruguière, 1792)
