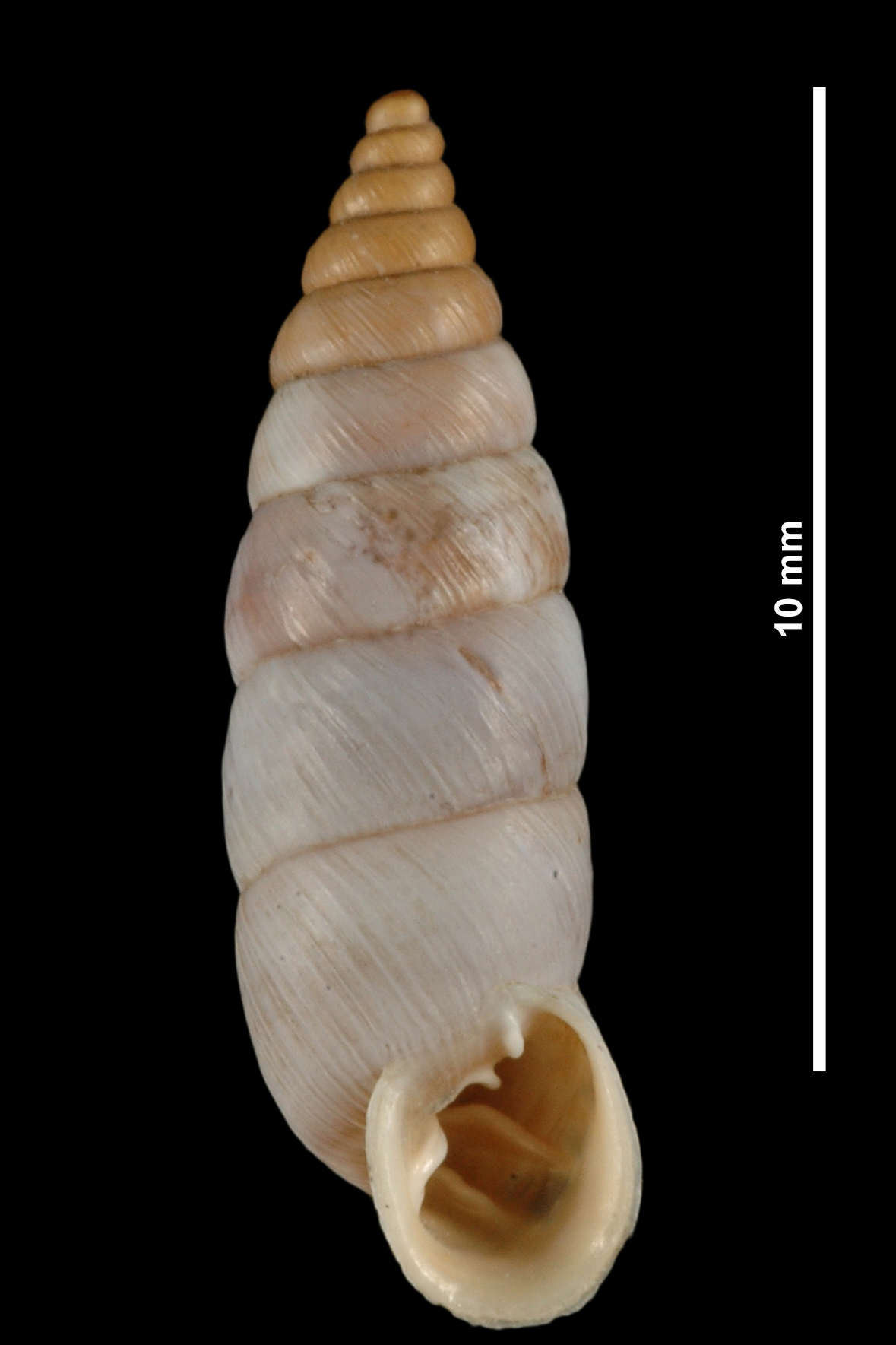
- Shell of Solatopupa guidoni (specimen at MNHN, Paris)

Conservation status
- Data Deficient (IUCN 3.1)

Scientific classification
- Kingdom: Animalia
- Phylum: Mollusca
- Class: Gastropoda
- Order: Stylommatophora
- Family: Chondrinidae
- Genus: Solatopupa
- Species: S. guidoni

Binomial name
- Solatopupa guidoni (Caziot, 1903)

Synonyms
- Abida similis var. laevigata Büttner, 1926 (junior synonym); Pupa similis var. guidoni Caziot, 1904 (original combination)

= Solatopupa guidoni =

Species of gastropod

Solatopupa guidoni is a species of air-breathing land snail, a terrestrial pulmonate gastropod mollusk in the family Chondrinidae.

Subspecies

- Solatopupa guidoni guidoni (Caziot, 1904)
- Solatopupa guidoni simonettae (Giusti, 1970)

== Distribution ==
This species is found in France and Italy.
