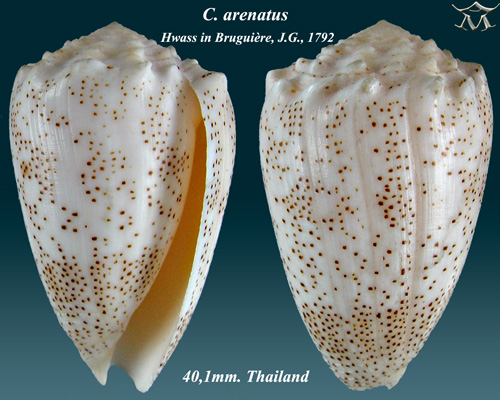
- Apertural and abapertural views of shell of Conus arenatus Hwass in Bruguière, J.G., 1792
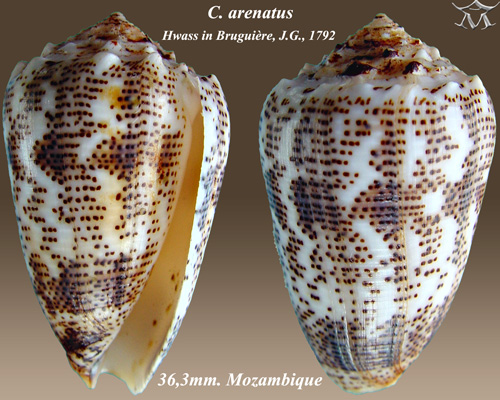

Conservation status
- Least Concern (IUCN 3.1)

Scientific classification
- Kingdom: Animalia
- Phylum: Mollusca
- Class: Gastropoda
- Subclass: Caenogastropoda
- Order: Neogastropoda
- Superfamily: Conoidea
- Family: Conidae
- Genus: Conus
- Species: C. arenatus

Binomial name
- Conus arenatus Hwass in Bruguière, 1792

Synonyms
- Conus (Puncticulis) arenatus Hwass in Bruguière, 1792 accepted, alternate representation; Conus arenatus var. aequipunctata Dautzenberg, 1937; Conus arenatus var. granulosa Lamarck, 1822; Conus arenatus var. mesokatharos Tryon, 1884; Conus arenatus var. punctisminutissimis Lamarck, 1822; Conus arenatus var. undata Dautzenberg, 1937 (invalid: junior homonym of C. undatus Kiener, 1847); Conus armatus E. A. Smith, 1891 (presumably a lapsus for arenatus); Conus catus var. granulosa Dautzenberg, 1937; Cucullus arenosus Röding, 1798; Cucullus stercusmuscarum Röding, 1798; Puncticulis arenatus E. A. Smith, 1891; Puncticulis arenatus bizona Coomans, Moolenbeek & Wils, 1981; Puncticulis arenatus var. punctisminutissus Lamarck, 1822; Puncticulis arenatus var. undata Dautzenberg, 1937; Puncticulis arenatus Hwass in Bruguière, 1792

= Conus arenatus =

Species of sea snail

Conus arenatus, common name the sand-dusted cone, is a species of sea snail, a marine gastropod mollusk in the family Conidae, the cone snails and their allies.

These snails are predatory and venomous. They are capable of stinging humans, therefore live ones should be handled carefully or not at all.

== Description ==
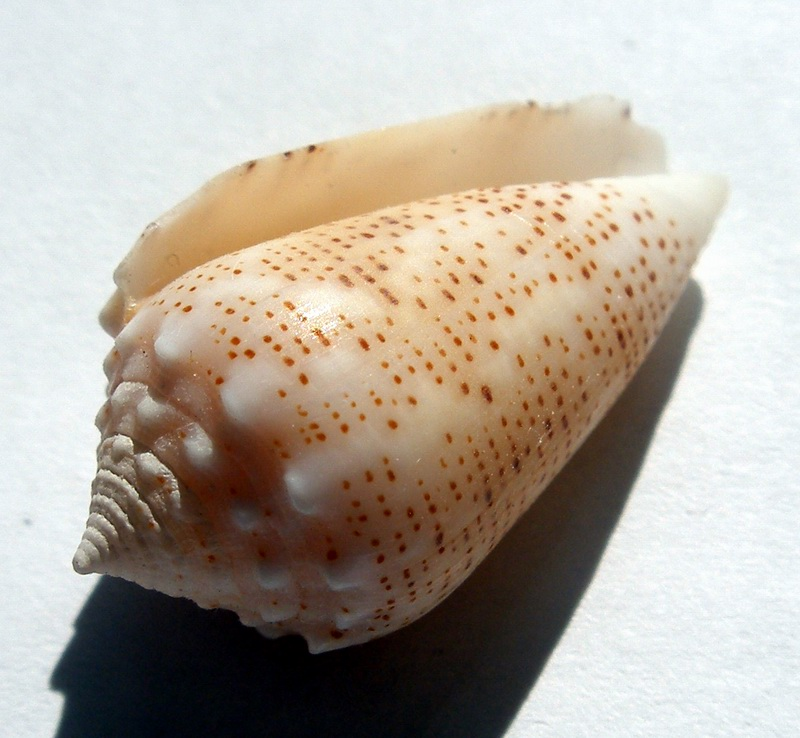
The shell of Conus arenatus

The size of the shell varies between 25 mm and 90 mm. The shell is stoutly turbinated, coronated on the spire. The color of the shell is white, sprinkled in a waved longitudinal manner with very small, close brown dots, sometimes forming indistinct bands. The aperture has usually a light flesh-color.

== Distribution ==
This marine species is occurs in the Red Sea and in the Indo-Pacific; and off Australia (Northern Territory, Queensland, Western Australia). The species now also occurs in the Mediterranean off Israel, having invaded as a Lessepsian migrant through the Suez Canal.
