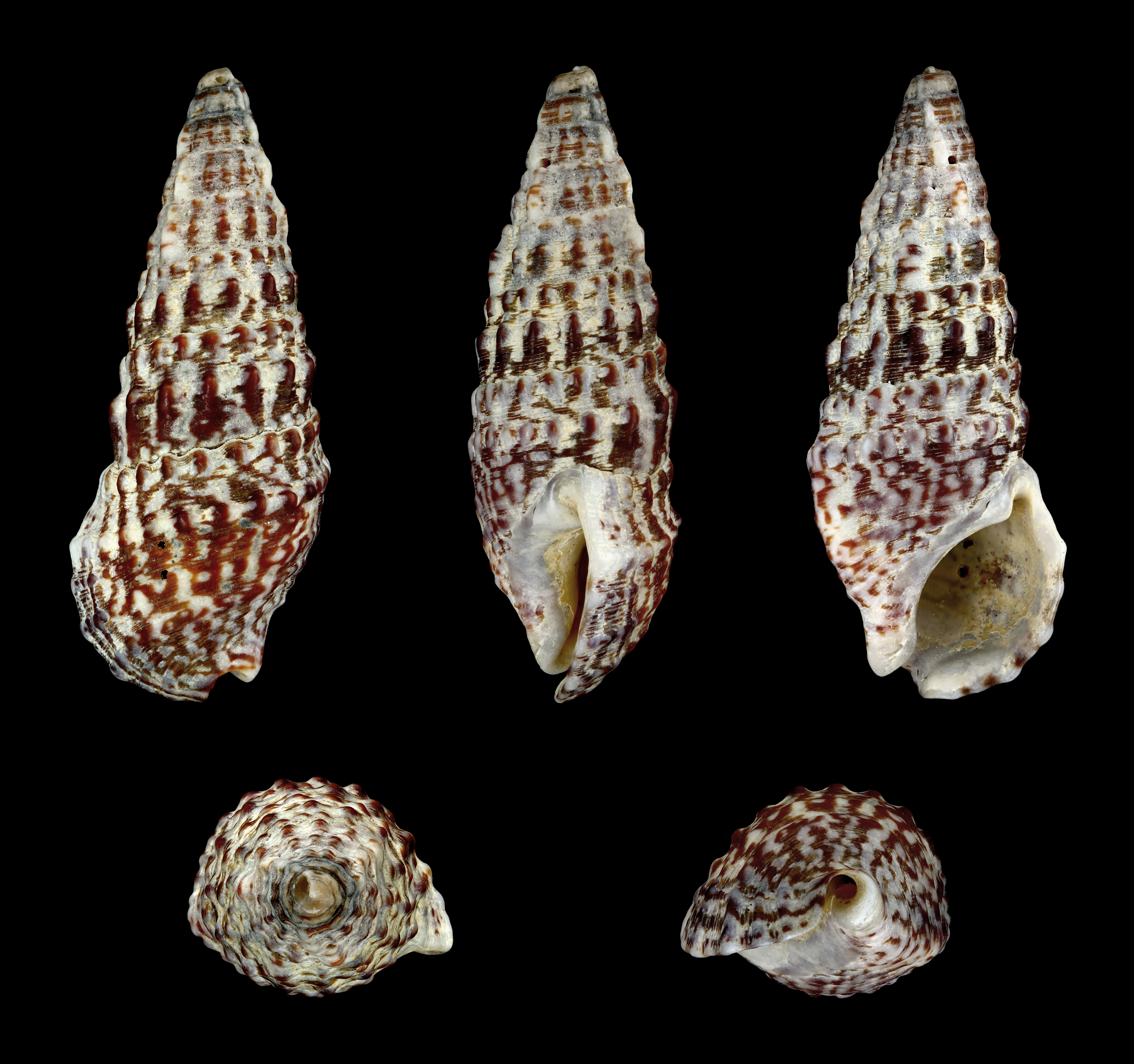
- Five views of a shell of Cerithium vulgatum

Scientific classification
- Kingdom: Animalia
- Phylum: Mollusca
- Class: Gastropoda
- Subclass: Caenogastropoda
- Order: incertae sedis
- Family: Cerithiidae
- Genus: Cerithium
- Species: C. vulgatum

Binomial name
- Cerithium vulgatum Bruguière, 1792

Synonyms
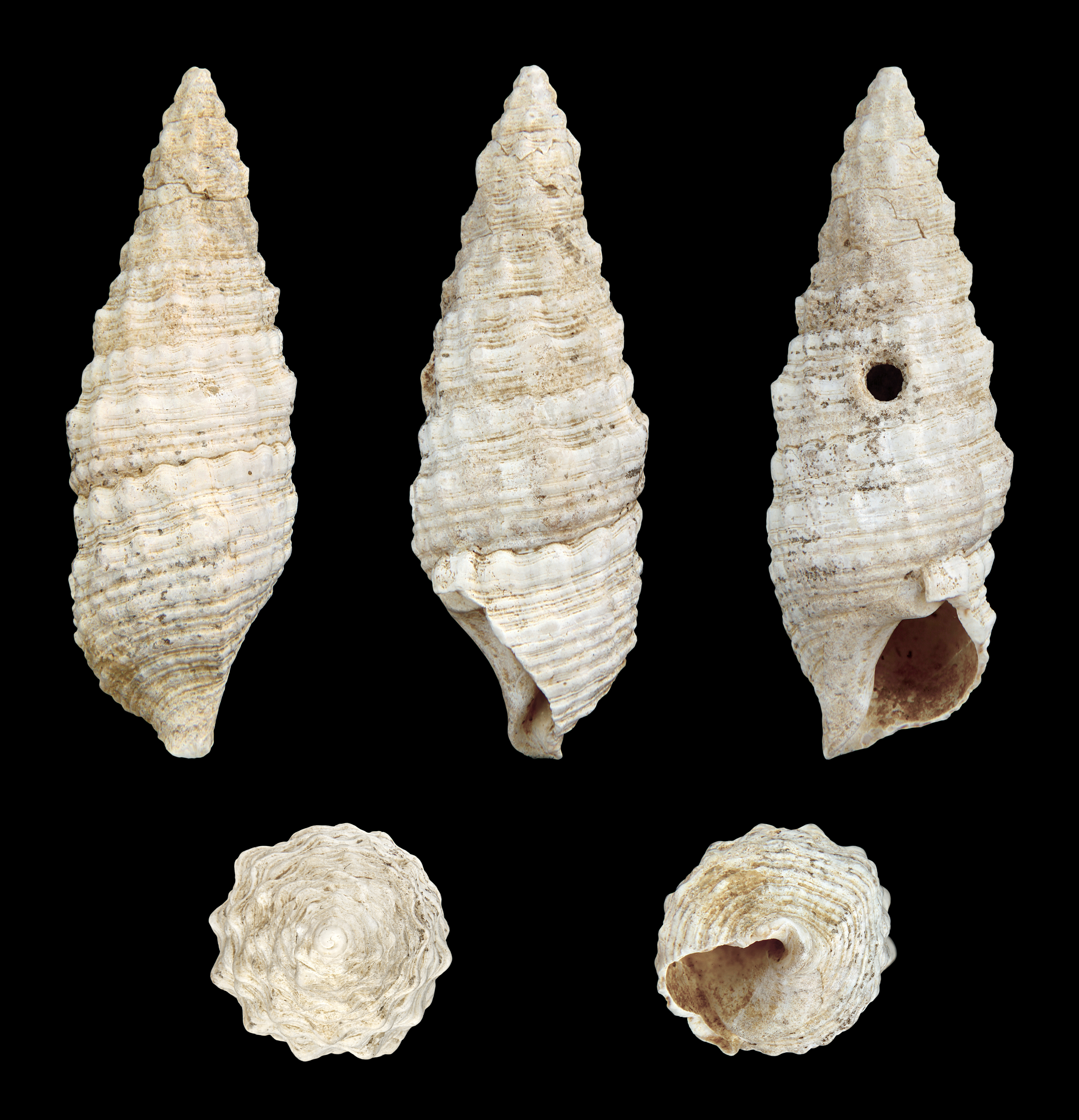
- Cerithium rupestre Risso, 1826 Fossil of the same species from the Pliocene

= Cerithium vulgatum =

Species of gastropod

Cerithium vulgatum is a species of sea snail, a marine gastropod mollusk in the family Cerithiidae.

== Description ==
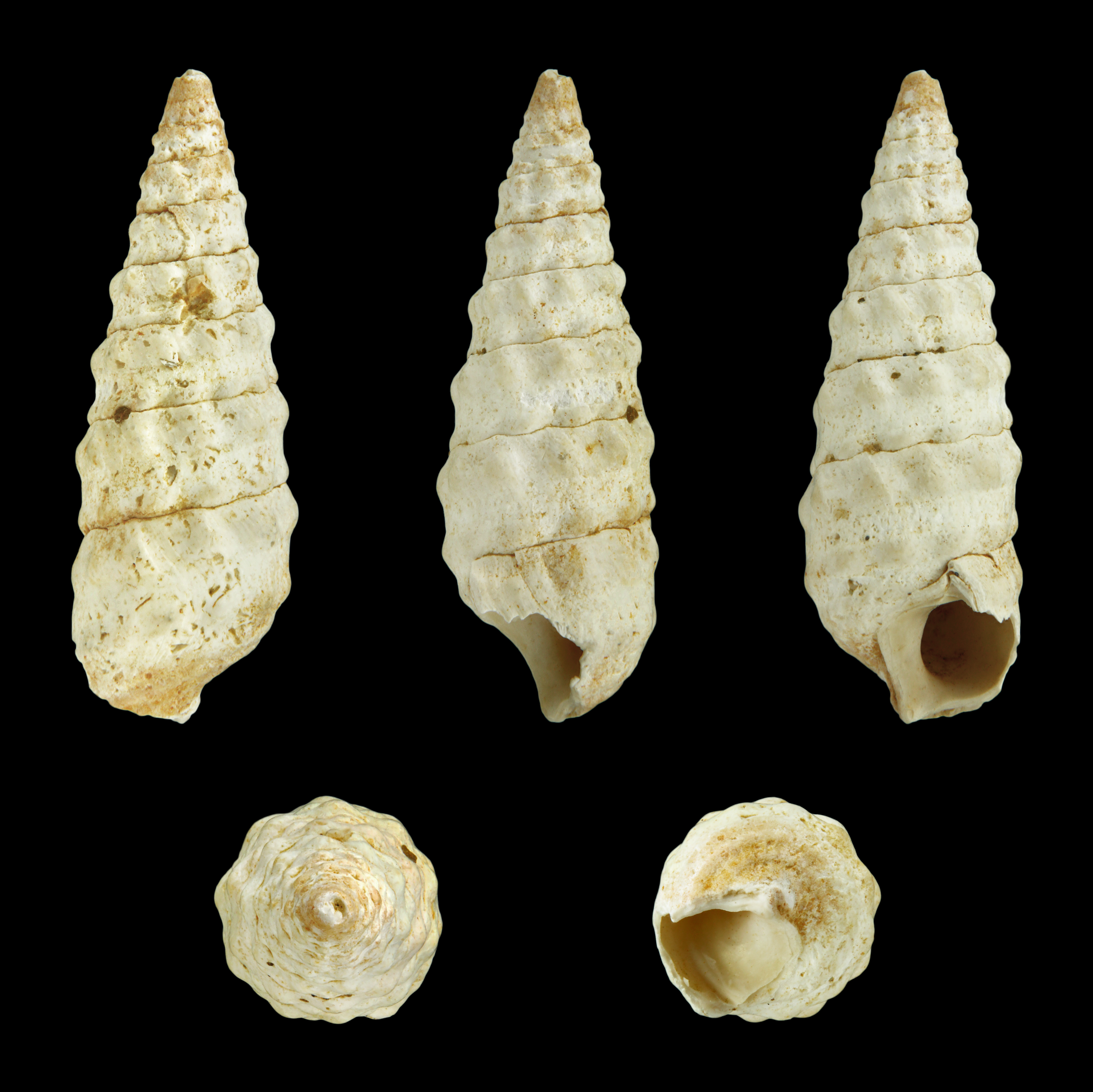
Cerithium vulgatum ssp. europaeum

== Distribution ==
This species can be found in European waters and in the Mediterranean Sea.
