= Conus robini =

Scientific classification
- Kingdom: Animalia
- Phylum: Mollusca
- Class: Gastropoda
- Subclass: Caenogastropoda
- Order: Neogastropoda
- Superfamily: Conoidea
- Family: Conidae
- Genus: Conus
- Species: C. robini

Binomial name
- Conus robini (Limpalaër & Monnier, 2012)

Synonyms
- Conus (Pionoconus) robini (Limpalaër & Monnier, 2012) · accepted, alternate representation; Pionoconus robini Limpalaër & Monnier, 2012 (original combination)

Species of sea snail

Conus robini is a species of sea snail, a marine gastropod mollusc in the family Conidae, the cone snails, cone shells or cones.

These snails are predatory and venomous. They are capable of stinging humans.

The epithet of this species was named after Alain Robin.

== Description ==
The size of the shell varies between 20 mm and 32 mm.

== Distribution ==
This marine species is endemic to the Philippines, off Balabac Island.
