= Conus atimovatae =

Scientific classification
- Kingdom: Animalia
- Phylum: Mollusca
- Class: Gastropoda
- Subclass: Caenogastropoda
- Order: Neogastropoda
- Superfamily: Conoidea
- Family: Conidae
- Genus: Conus
- Species: C. atimovatae

Binomial name
- Conus atimovatae (Bozzetti, 2012)

Synonyms
- Conus (Pionoconus) atimovatae (Bozzetti, 2012); Pionoconus atimovatae Bozzetti, 2012

Species of sea snail

Conus atimovatae is a species of sea snail, a marine gastropod mollusc in the family Conidae, the cone snails, cone shells or cones. Their shells are typically brown with white streaks.

These snails are predatory and venomous. They are capable of stinging humans.

== Description ==
The size of the shell attains 21 mm.

== Distribution ==
This marine species occurs off at Southern Madagascar.
