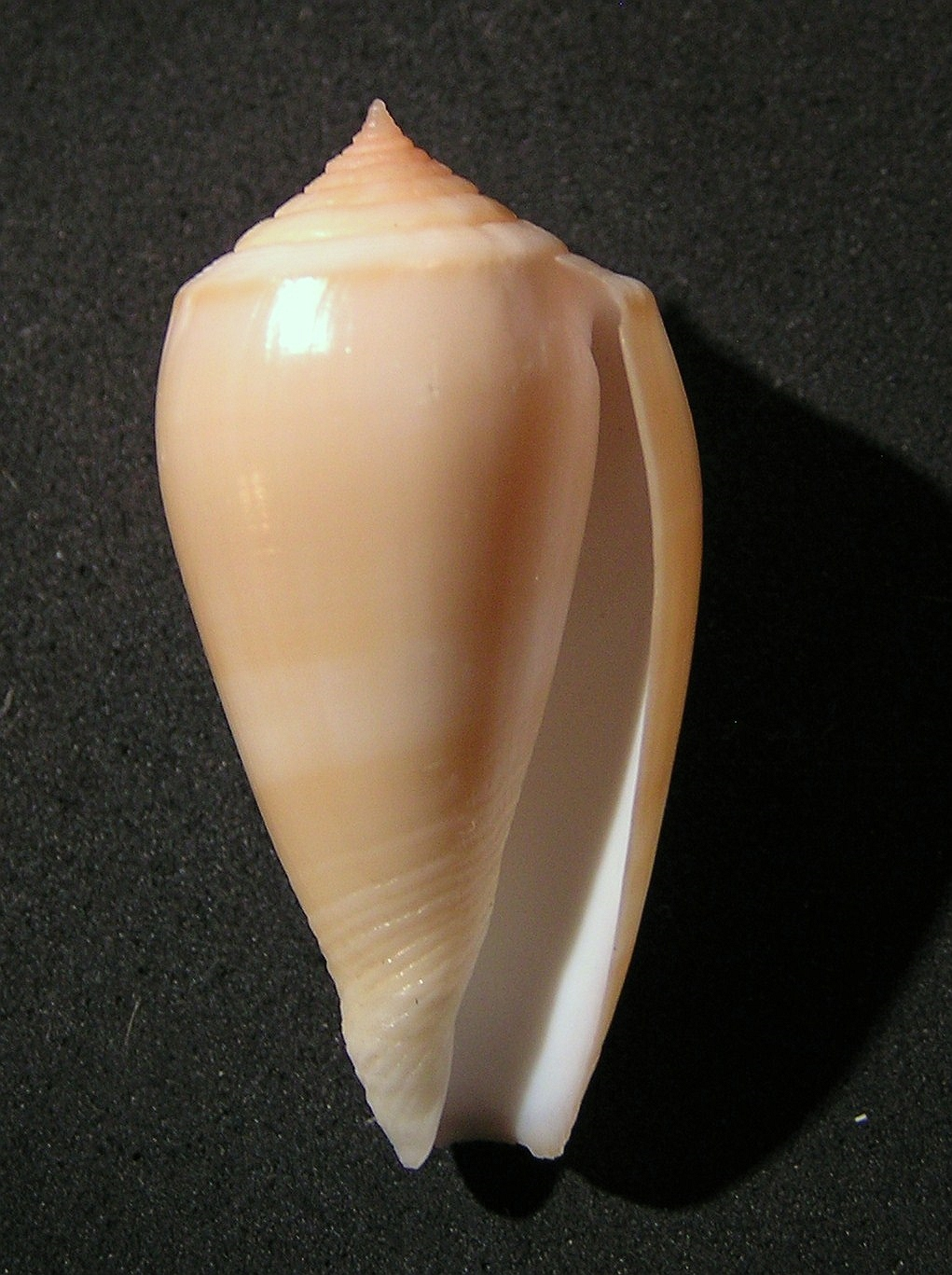
- Apertural view of Conus leobottonii

Scientific classification
- Kingdom: Animalia
- Phylum: Mollusca
- Class: Gastropoda
- Subclass: Caenogastropoda
- Order: Neogastropoda
- Superfamily: Conoidea
- Family: Conidae
- Genus: Conus
- Species: C. leobottonii

Binomial name
- Conus leobottonii Lorenz, 2006

Synonyms
- Conus (Pionoconus) leobottonii Lorenz, 2006 · accepted, alternate representation; Pionoconus leobottonii (Lorenz, 2006)

= Conus leobottonii =

Species of sea snail

Conus leobottonii, common name, the Sartorial cone, is a species of sea snail, a marine gastropod mollusk in the family Conidae, the cone snails and their allies.

Like all species within the genus Conus, these snails are predatory and venomous. They are capable of stinging humans, therefore live ones should be handled carefully or not at all.

== Description ==
The size of an adult shell varies between 27 mm and 53 mm.

== Distribution ==
This species is found in the Pacific Ocean off the Philippines.

== Gallery ==
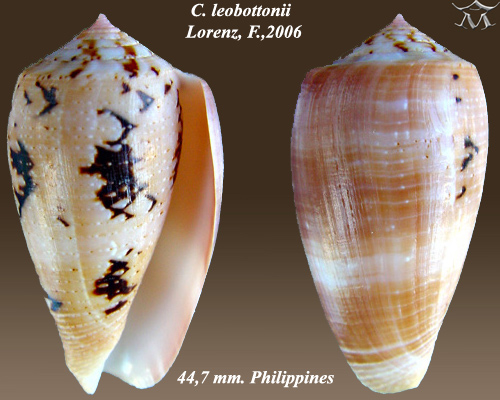
Conus leobottonii Lorenz, F., 2006

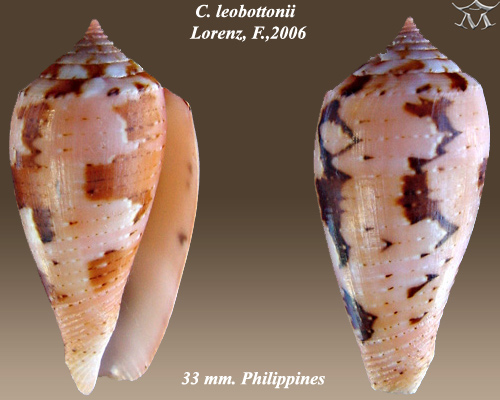
Conus leobottonii Lorenz, F., 2006
