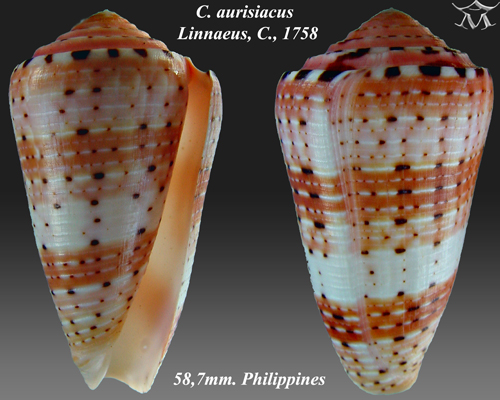
- Apertural and abapertural views of shell of Conus aurisiacus Linnaeus, C., 1758
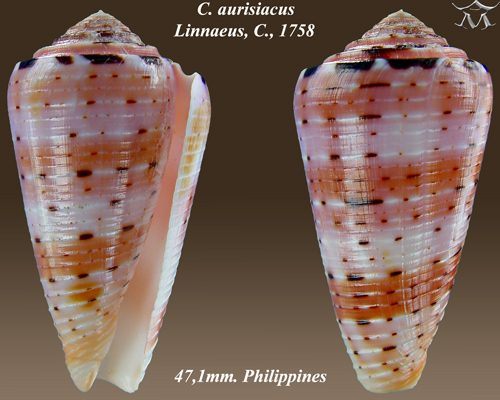

Conservation status
- Least Concern (IUCN 3.1)

Scientific classification
- Kingdom: Animalia
- Phylum: Mollusca
- Class: Gastropoda
- Subclass: Caenogastropoda
- Order: Neogastropoda
- Superfamily: Conoidea
- Family: Conidae
- Genus: Conus
- Species: C. aurisiacus

Binomial name
- Conus aurisiacus Linnaeus, 1758

Synonyms
- Conus (Pionoconus) aurisiacus Linnaeus, 1758 · accepted, alternate representation; Pionoconus aurisiacus (Linnaeus, 1758)

= Conus aurisiacus =

Species of sea snail

Conus aurisiacus, common name the aurisiacus cone, is a species of sea snail, a marine gastropod mollusk in the family Conidae, the cone snails and their allies.

Like all species within the genus Conus, these snails are predatory and venomous. They are capable of stinging humans, therefore live ones should be handled carefully or not at all.

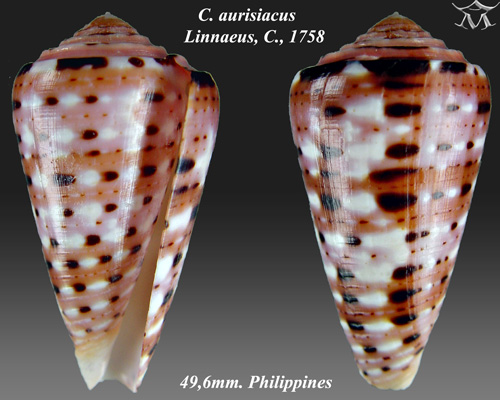
Conus aurisiacus Linnaeus, C., 1758

== Description ==
The size of the shell varies between 43 mm and 95 mm. The shell shows slight revolving ridges, sometimes granulated below. The spire is channeled and striate. The color of the shell is pink-white, with deeper-colored bands, distantly encircled by lines of short dashes and dots of chocolate. The spire shows conspicuous chocolate markings.

== Distribution ==
This marine species occurs off the Philippines, Indonesia and Australia.
