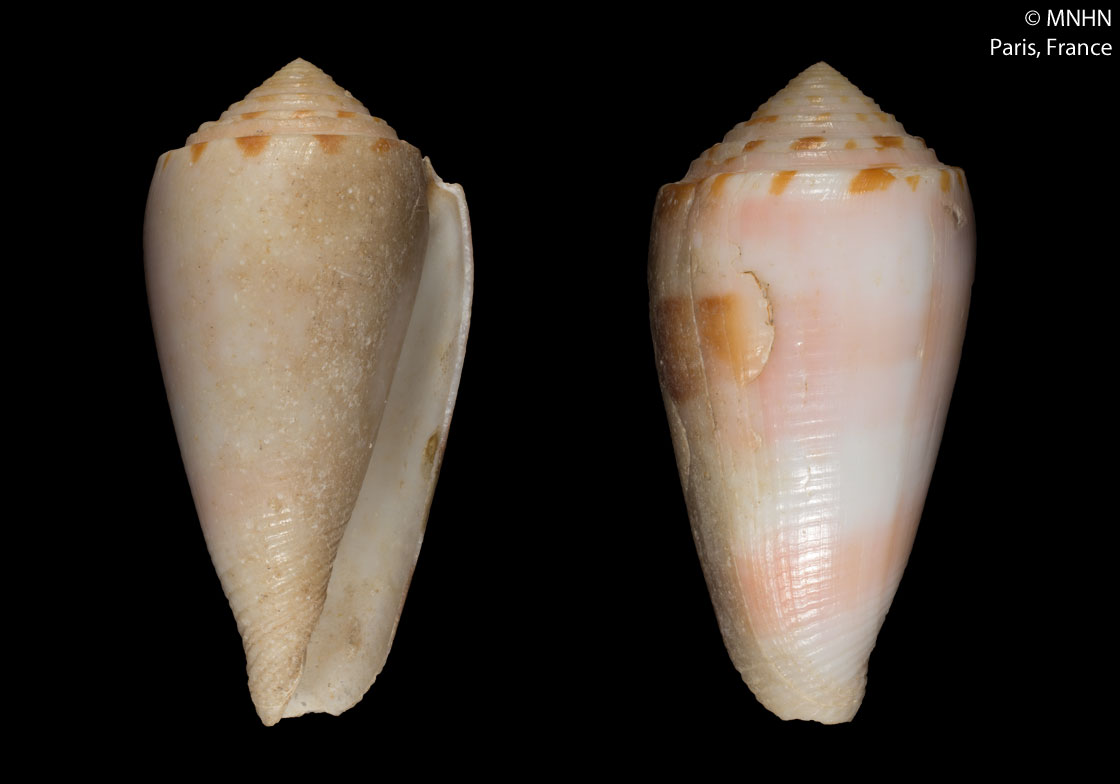
- Shell of Conus boutetorum (paratype at MNHN, Paris)

Scientific classification
- Kingdom: Animalia
- Phylum: Mollusca
- Class: Gastropoda
- Subclass: Caenogastropoda
- Order: Neogastropoda
- Superfamily: Conoidea
- Family: Conidae
- Genus: Conus
- Species: C. boutetorum

Binomial name
- Conus boutetorum Richard & Rabiller, 2013

Synonyms
- Conus (Pionoconus) boutetorum Richard & Rabiller, 2013 accepted, alternate representation; Pionoconus boutetorum (Richard & Rabiller, 2013)

= Conus boutetorum =

Species of sea snail

Conus boutetorum is a species of sea snail, a marine gastropod mollusk in the family Conidae, the cone snails, cone shells or cones.

These snails are predatory and venomous. They are capable of stinging humans.

== Distribution ==
This marine species occurs in the Pacific Ocean off Tahiti
