= Conus koukae =

Scientific classification
- Domain: Eukaryota
- Kingdom: Animalia
- Phylum: Mollusca
- Class: Gastropoda
- Subclass: Caenogastropoda
- Order: Neogastropoda
- Superfamily: Conoidea
- Family: Conidae
- Genus: Conus
- Species: C. koukae

Binomial name
- Conus koukae (Monnier, Limpalaër & Robin, 2013)

Synonyms
- Conus (Pionoconus) koukae (Monnier, Limpalaër & Robin, 2013) · accepted, alternate representation; Pionoconus koukae Monnier, Limpalaër & Robin, 2013 (original combination)

Species of sea snail

Conus koukae is a species of sea snail, a marine gastropod mollusk in the family Conidae, the cone snails, cone shells or cones.

These snails are predatory and venomous. They are capable of stinging humans.

== Description ==
The size of the shell varies between 35 mm and 47 mm.

== Distribution ==
This marine species occurs off Masirah and Muscat, Oman
