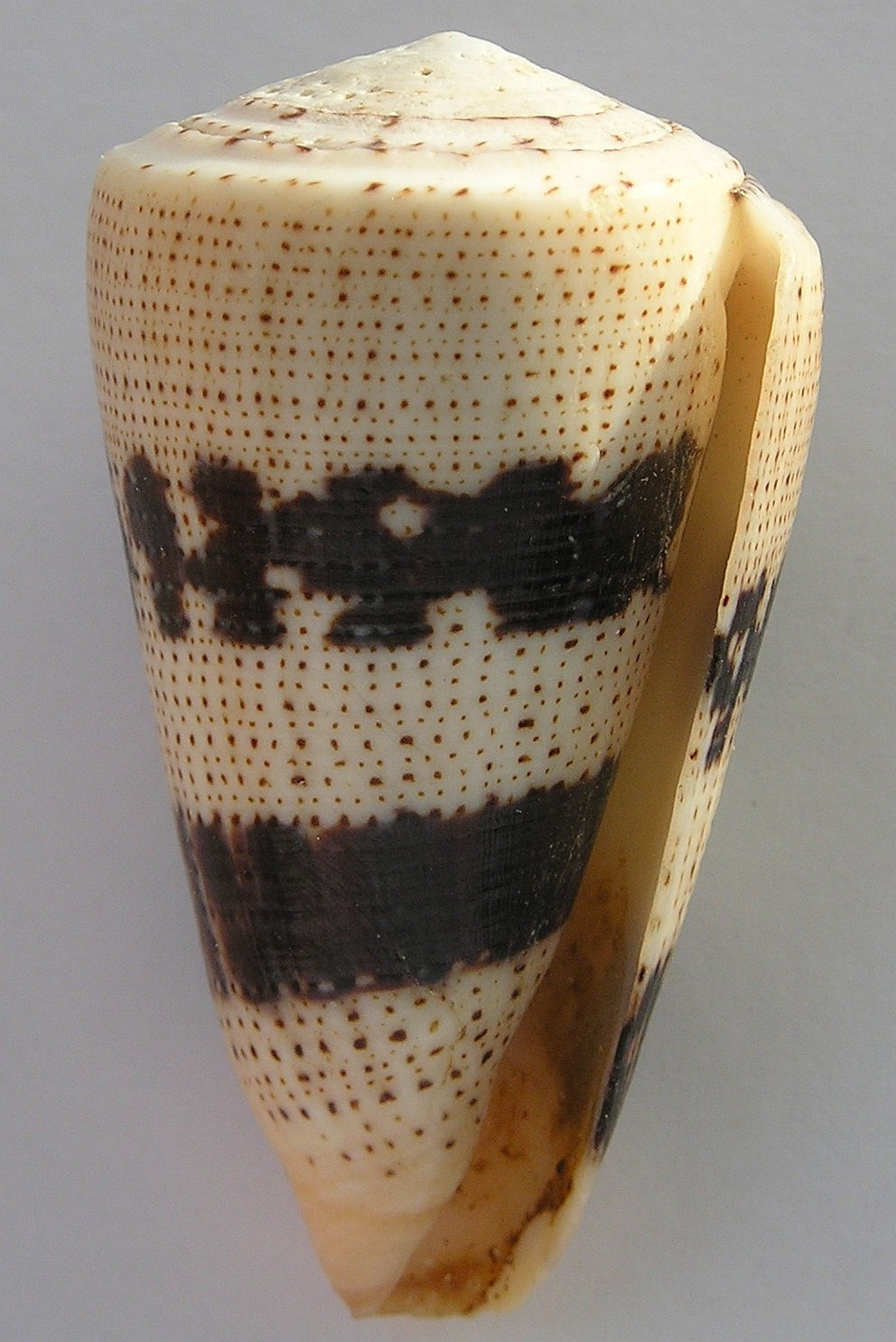
- Apertural view of a shell of Conus augur

Conservation status
- Least Concern (IUCN 3.1)

Scientific classification
- Kingdom: Animalia
- Phylum: Mollusca
- Class: Gastropoda
- Subclass: Caenogastropoda
- Order: Neogastropoda
- Superfamily: Conoidea
- Family: Conidae
- Genus: Conus
- Species: C. augur

Binomial name
- Conus augur sensu Lightfoot, 1786

Synonyms
- Conus (Strategoconus) augur sensu Lightfoot, 1786 accepted, alternate representation; Conus augur Hwass in Bruguiere, 1792; Conus punctatus Gmelin, 1791; Conus magus Röding, 1798; Conus punctatus Gmelin, 1791; Cucullus magus Röding, 1798 (junior secondary homonym of Conus magus Linnaeus, 1758); Cucullus pulverulentus Röding, 1798; Vituliconus augur (Lightfoot, J., 1786)

= Conus augur =

Species of sea snail

Conus augur, commonly known as the auger cone, is a species of sea snail, a marine gastropod mollusk in the family Conidae, which includes the cone snails, cone shells, or cones.

Like all species in the genus Conus, these snails are predatory and venomous. They are capable of stinging humans; therefore, live ones should be handled carefully or not at all.

== Description ==
The size of an adult shell varies between 45 mm and 76 mm. The creamy white shell is encircled by close rows of very small chestnut dots, with two bands of irregular brown markings—one above and the other below the middle of the body whorl. The spire is maculated with brown.

== Distribution ==
This marine species occurs in the Indian Ocean, particularly along the Aldabra Atoll and off the coast of Madagascar; as well as in the Southwest Pacific Ocean.

== Gallery ==
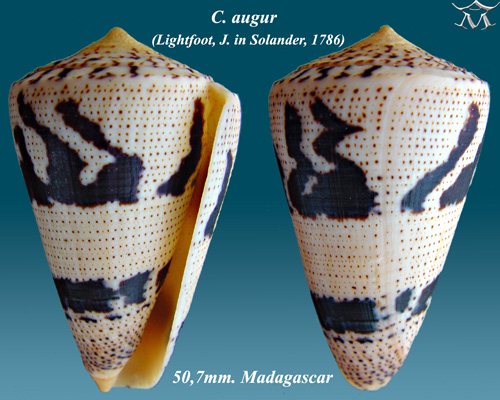
Conus augur (Lightfoot, J. in Solander, 1786)

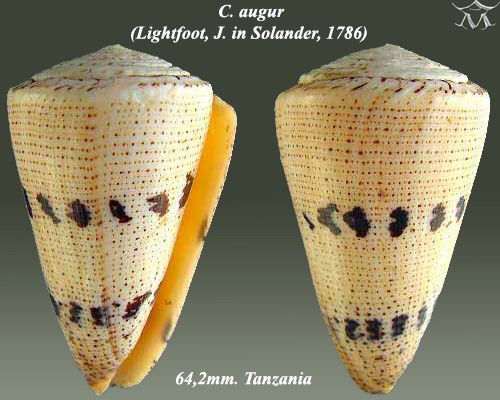
Conus augur (Lightfoot, J. in Solander, 1786)

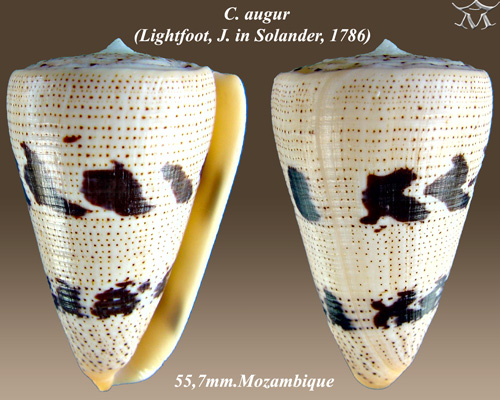
Conus augur (Lightfoot, J. in Solander, 1786)

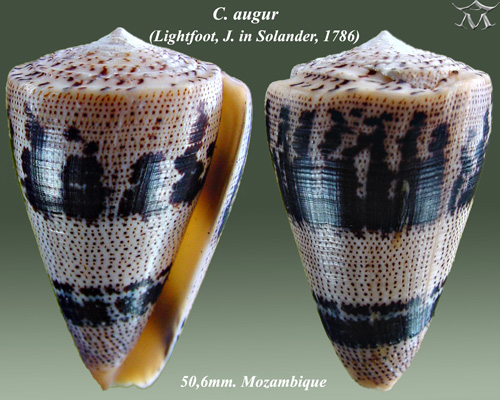
Conus augur (Lightfoot, J. in Solander, 1786)
