= Conus morrisoni =

Scientific classification
- Domain: Eukaryota
- Kingdom: Animalia
- Phylum: Mollusca
- Class: Gastropoda
- Subclass: Caenogastropoda
- Order: Neogastropoda
- Superfamily: Conoidea
- Family: Conidae
- Genus: Conus
- Species: C. morrisoni

Binomial name
- Conus morrisoni G. Raybaudi Massilia, 1991

Synonyms
- Conus (Pionoconus) morrisoni G. Raybaudi Massilia, 1991 · accepted, alternate representation; Pionoconus morrisoni (G. Raybaudi Massilia, 1991)

Species of sea snail

Conus morrisoni is a species of sea snail, a marine gastropod mollusk in the family Conidae, the cone snails and their allies.

Like all species within the genus Conus, these snails are predatory and venomous. They are capable of stinging humans, therefore live ones should be handled carefully or not at all.

== Description ==
Original description: "The shell is small (20-30 mm), oblong-ovate, having a conical spire consisting of 9 whorls with a doubled-whorled protoconch. Surface of sloping whorls are flat and finely incised with transverse threads; the penultimate whorl is concave and forming a distinct angulate shoulder. The sides are convexly curved, and the body whorl is covered with irregular undulating spiral ridges, which are often granulose. The ground colour is white, with a deep pink protoconch and the very first postnuclear whorls. The body whorl is entirely covered with cloudy patches of vermillion and white. Specimens are also seen in orange-brown instead of red, with a smooth surface. The aperture is white to pinkish and moderately wide, distending slightly towards the anterior end.

External Morphology of mollusk: A syphon which is white with blotches of light brown-tan and having its rim encircled with a pink to orange narrow band; the foot being also white with the same light brown-tan blotches. Operculum small and narrow."

The size of the shell varies between 25 mm and 52 mm.

== Distribution ==
Locus typicus: "Ashmore Reef, Timor Sea, approx. 610 kilometres North of Broome, N-W Australia."

This species occurs in the Timor Sea, Australia.
