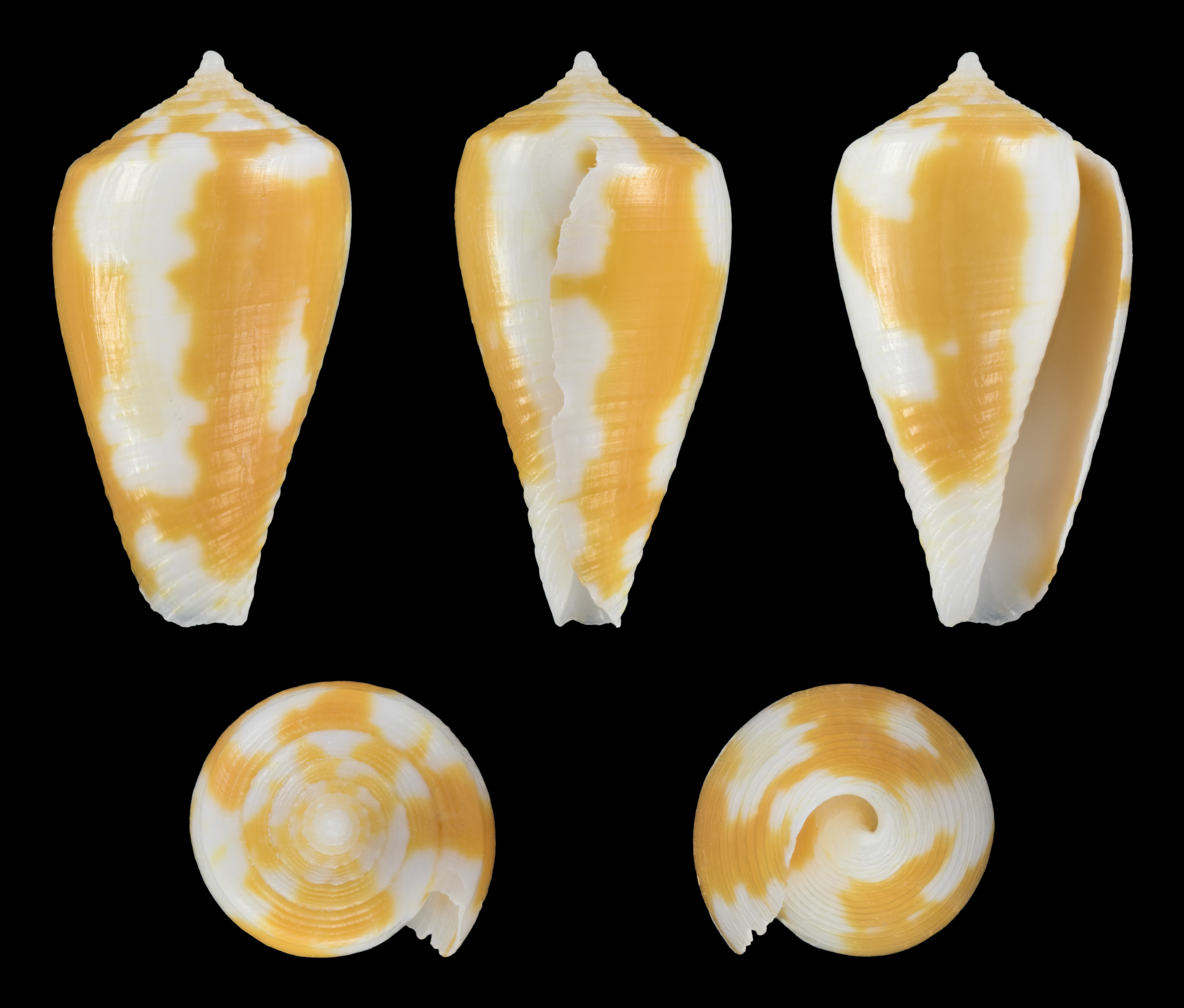
- Five views of a shell of Conus fischoederi Röckel, D. & A.J. da Motta, 1983

Conservation status
- Least Concern (IUCN 3.1)

Scientific classification
- Kingdom: Animalia
- Phylum: Mollusca
- Class: Gastropoda
- Subclass: Caenogastropoda
- Order: Neogastropoda
- Superfamily: Conoidea
- Family: Conidae
- Genus: Conus
- Species: C. fischoederi

Binomial name
- Conus fischoederi Röckel & da Motta, 1983

Synonyms
- Conus (Pionoconus) fischoederi Röckel & da Motta, 1983 · accepted, alternate representation; Pionoconus fischoederi (Röckel & da Motta, 1983)

= Conus fischoederi =

Species of sea snail

Conus fischoederi is a species of sea snail, a marine gastropod mollusk in the family Conidae, the cone snails and their allies.

Like all species within the genus Conus, these snails are predatory and venomous. They are capable of stinging humans, therefore live ones should be handled carefully or not at all.

== Description ==
The size of the shell varies between 20 mm and 49 mm.

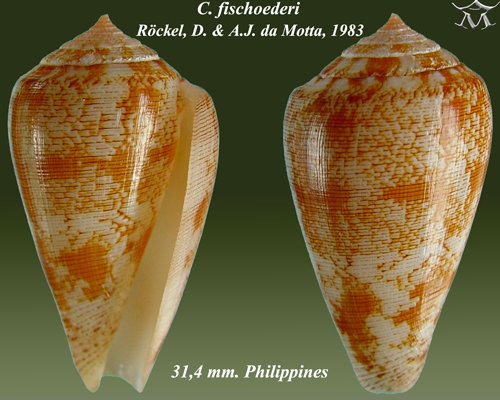

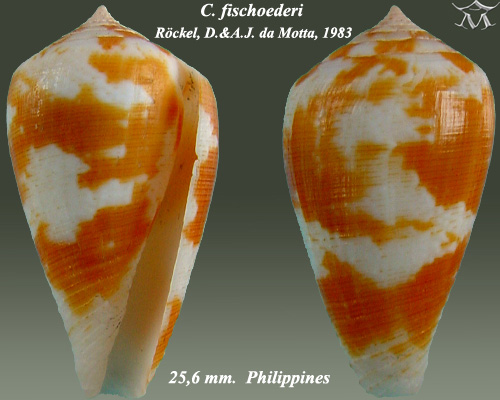

== Distribution ==
This marine species occurs off the Philippines and Western Thailand.
