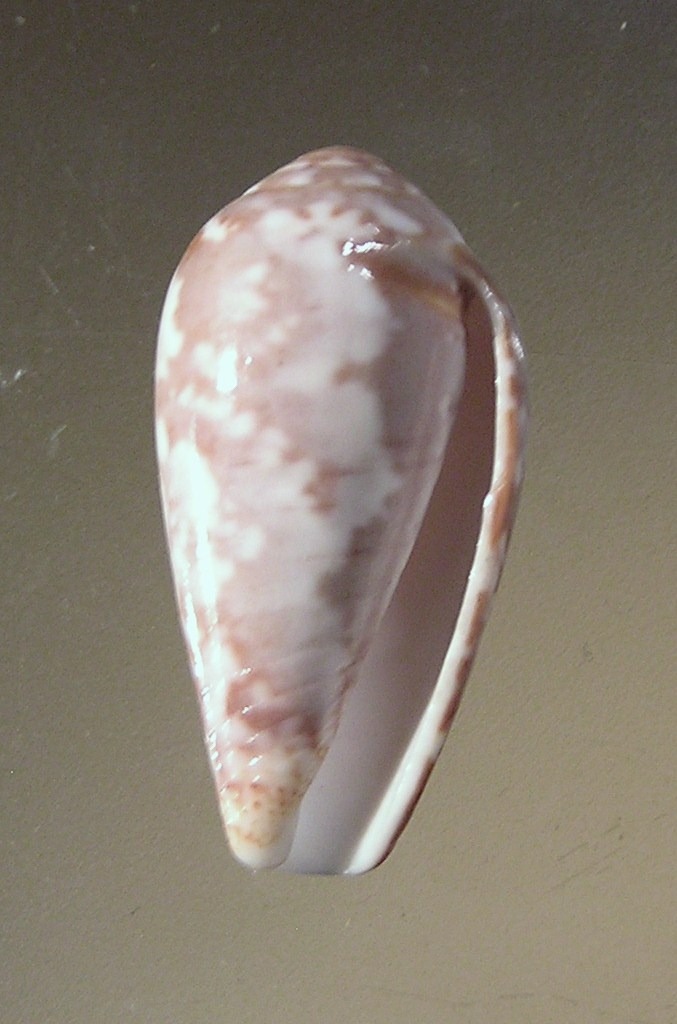
- Apertural view of a shell of Conus barbara

Scientific classification
- Kingdom: Animalia
- Phylum: Mollusca
- Class: Gastropoda
- Subclass: Caenogastropoda
- Order: Neogastropoda
- Superfamily: Conoidea
- Family: Conidae
- Genus: Conus
- Species: C. barbara

Binomial name
- Conus barbara Brazier, 1898

Synonyms
- Conus (Pionoconus) barbara Brazier, 1898 · accepted, alternate representation; Pionoconus barbara (Brazier, 1898)

= Conus barbara =

Species of sea snail

Conus barbara is a species of sea snail, a marine gastropod mollusk in the family Conidae, the cone snails, cone shells or cones.

These snails are predatory and venomous. They are capable of stinging humans.

== Description ==
The size of the shell varies between 20 mm and 40 mm.

(Original description) The shell is elongated and subcylindrical with a turbinated shape. Its smooth, white surface is sporadically mottled with bluish-brown patches and adorned with spiral patterns of interrupted brown dots and opaque white lines. The spire is obtuse, consisting of eight whorls separated by a narrow suture that features three deep spiral grooves. While the base is deeply grooved and finely punctured, the aperture remains very narrow at the posterior end before widening toward the anterior. The peristome is slightly angled, revealing a bluish-white interior.

== Distribution ==
This marine species occurs off Western Australia and the Solomon Islands.
