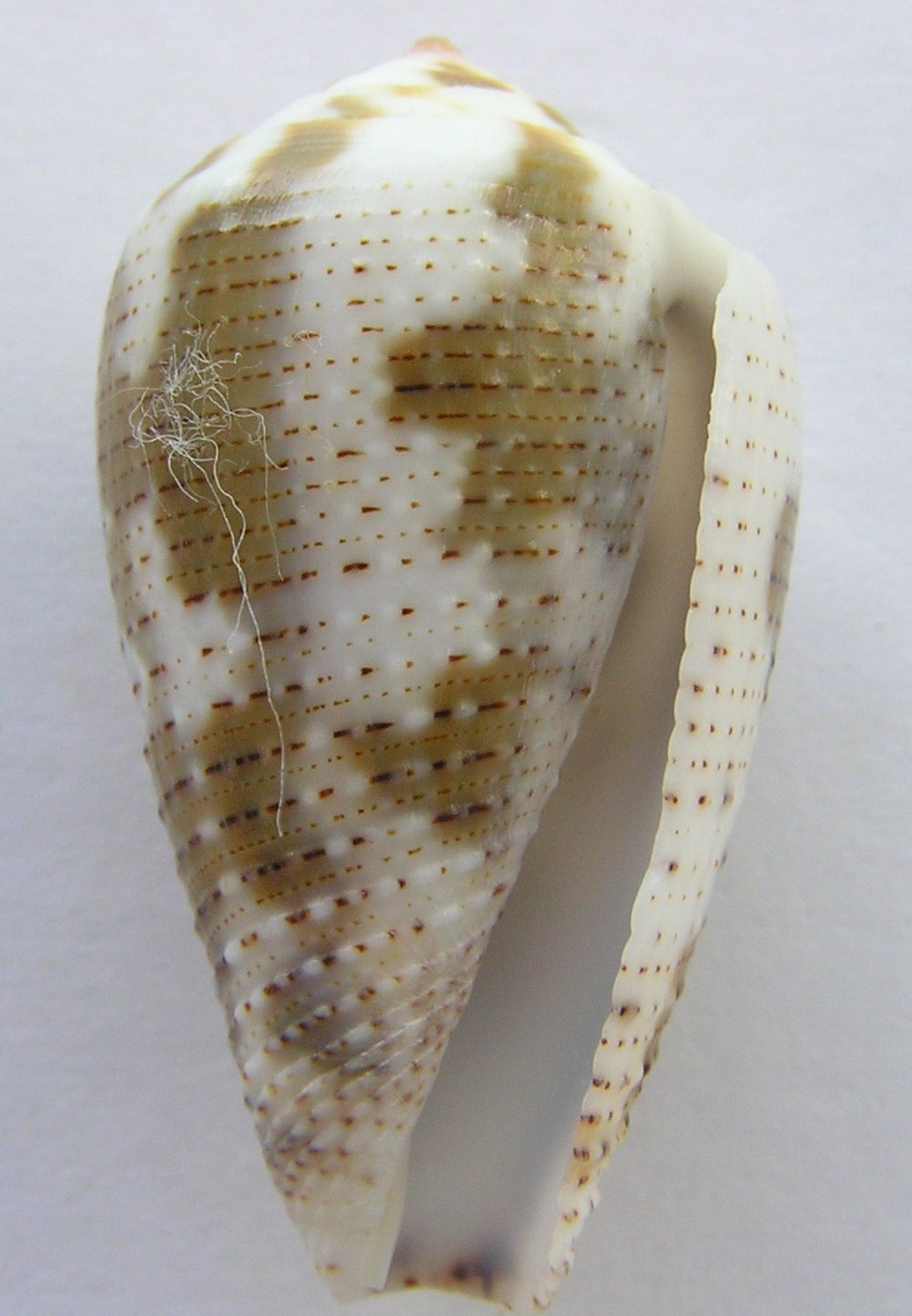
- Apertural view of a shell of Conus nigropunctatus

Scientific classification
- Kingdom: Animalia
- Phylum: Mollusca
- Class: Gastropoda
- Subclass: Caenogastropoda
- Order: Neogastropoda
- Superfamily: Conoidea
- Family: Conidae
- Genus: Conus
- Species: C. nigropunctatus

Binomial name
- Conus nigropunctatus G. B. Sowerby II, 1858

Synonyms
- Conus (Pionoconus) nigropunctatus G. B. Sowerby II, 1858 · accepted, alternate representation; Conus nigropunctatus elatensis Wils, 1971; Conus nigropunctatus var. peledi Wils, 1971; Pionoconus nigropunctatus (G. B. Sowerby II, 1858)

= Conus nigropunctatus =

Species of sea snail

Conus nigropunctatus, common name the black-spot cone, is a species of sea snail, a marine gastropod mollusk in the family Conidae, the cone snails, cone shells or cones.

These snails are predatory and venomous. They are capable of stinging humans.

== Description ==
The size of the shell varies between 25 mm and 50 mm. The bulbous shell has a convex, striate spire. The body whorl has rounded striate, which are usually obsolete above, granular below. The color is olive, chestnut-, chocolate- or pink-brown, variously marbled and flecked with white, often faintly white-banded below the middle. The shell is encircled by a series of chocolate-colored dots.

== Distribution ==
This marine species occurs in the Red Sea and the Western Pacific
