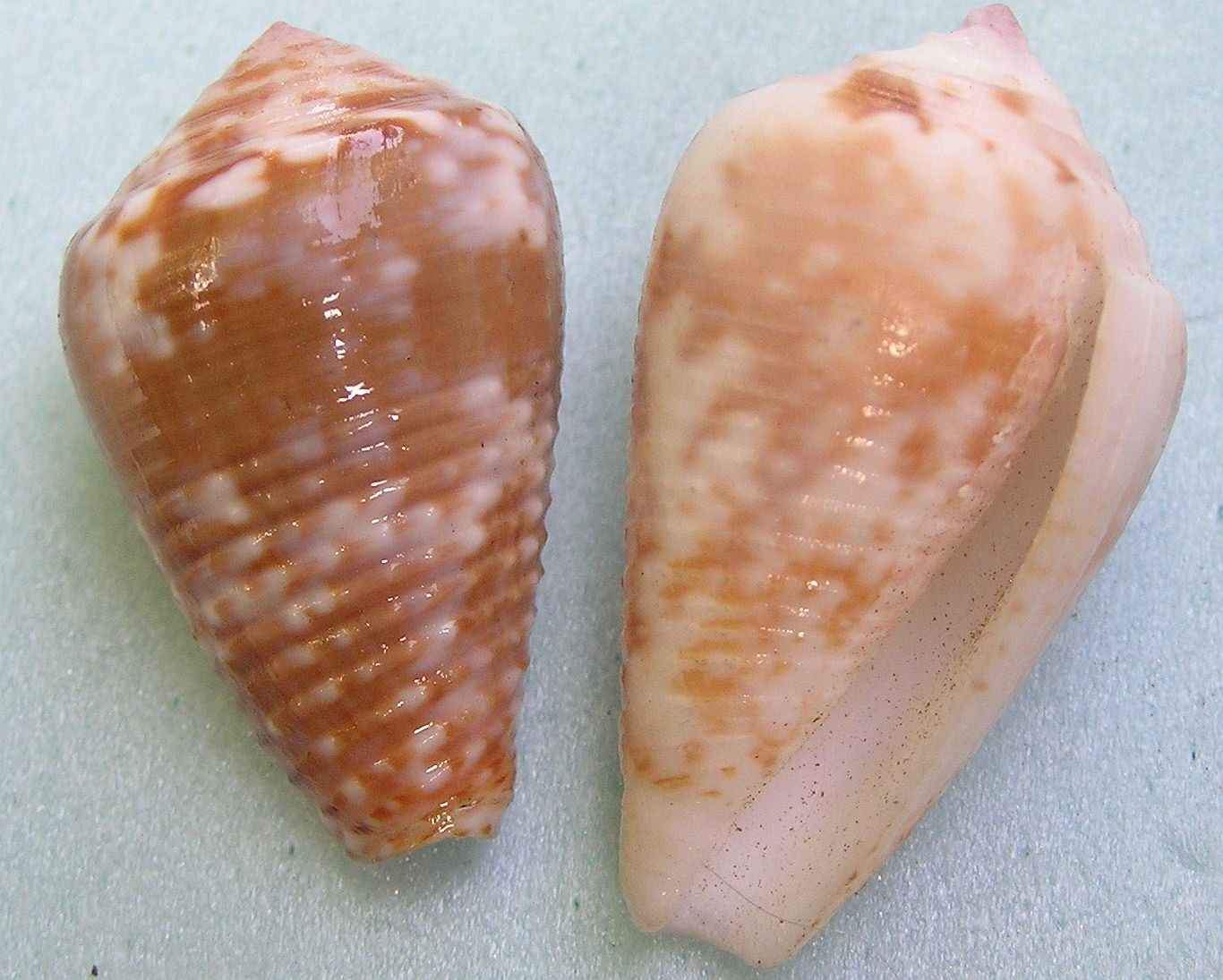
- Shell of Conus catus

Conservation status
- Least Concern (IUCN 3.1)

Scientific classification
- Kingdom: Animalia
- Phylum: Mollusca
- Class: Gastropoda
- Subclass: Caenogastropoda
- Order: Neogastropoda
- Superfamily: Conoidea
- Family: Conidae
- Genus: Conus
- Species: C. catus

Binomial name
- Conus catus Hwass in Bruguière, 1792

Synonyms
- Conus (Pionoconus) catus Hwass in Bruguière, 1792 accepted, alternate representation; Conus catus var. fuscoolivaceus Dautzenberg, 1937; Conus catus var. granulata Wils, 1971 (unavailable name); Conus catus var. rubrapapillosa Dautzenberg, 1937; Conus collisus var. granulosus Barros e Cunha, 1933 (invalid: junior homonym of C. arenatus var. granulosa Lamarck, 1822); Conus discrepans G.B. Sowerby II, 1833; Conus reflectus G. B. Sowerby III, 1877; Conus reflexus G. B. Sowerby III, 1887; Cucullus nubilis Röding, 1798; Pionoconus catus (Hwass in Bruguière, 1792)

= Conus catus =

Species of sea snail

Conus catus, common name the cat cone, is a species of sea snail, a marine gastropod mollusk in the family Conidae, the cone snails and their allies.

Like all species within the genus Conus, these snails are predatory and venomous. They are capable of stinging humans, therefore live ones should be handled carefully or not at all.

== Description ==
The size of an adult shell varies between 24 mm and 52 mm. The shell is bulbous, with a convex, striate spire. The body whorl is striate, the striae rounded, usually obsolete above, granular below, olive, chestnut-, chocolate- or pink-brown, variously marbled and flecked with white, often faintly white-banded below the middle. In the variety nigropunctatus, the shell is colored as above and encircled by series of chocolate-colored dots.

== Distribution ==
This species occurs in the Red Sea, the Indian Ocean off the Aldabra Atoll, Chagos, Madagascar, Mauritius, Tanzania and KwaZuluNatal; in the tropical Indo-West Pacific Region (Papua New Guinea, Marquesas, New Caledonia); off Australia (New South Wales, the Northern Territory, Queensland and Western Australia).
