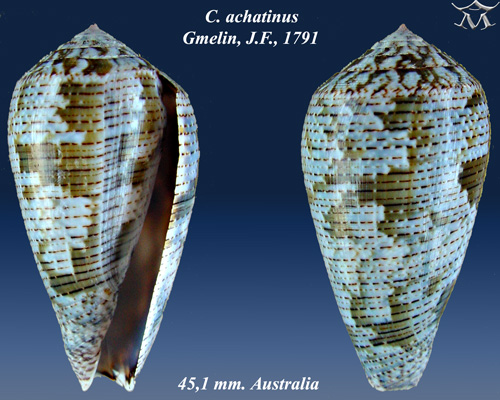
- Apertural and abapertural views of shell of Conus achatinus Gmelin, J.F., 1791
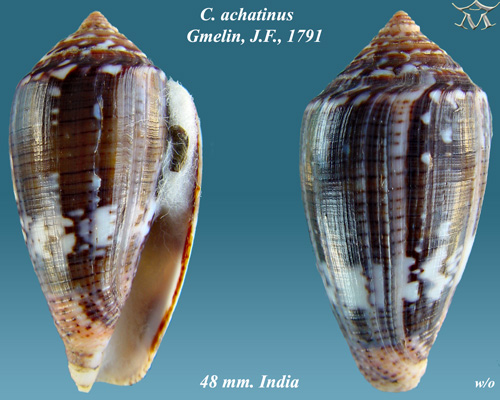

Conservation status
- Least Concern (IUCN 3.1)

Scientific classification
- Kingdom: Animalia
- Phylum: Mollusca
- Class: Gastropoda
- Subclass: Caenogastropoda
- Order: Neogastropoda
- Superfamily: Conoidea
- Family: Conidae
- Genus: Conus
- Species: C. achatinus

Binomial name
- Conus achatinus Gmelin, 1791

Synonyms
- Chelyconus achatinus (Gmelin, 1791); Conus (Pioconus) achatinus Gmelin, 1791 accepted, alternate representation; Conus achatinus var. infumata Dautzenberg, 1937; Conus ranunculus Hwass in Bruguière, 1792; Cucullus ventricosus , 1798 (objective junior synonym of Conus achatinus Gmelin, 1791); Pionoconus achatinus (Gmelin, 1791)

= Conus achatinus =

Species of sea snail

Conus achatinus, common name the turtle cone or the agate cone, is a species of sea snail, a marine gastropod mollusk in the family Conidae, the cone snails and their allies.

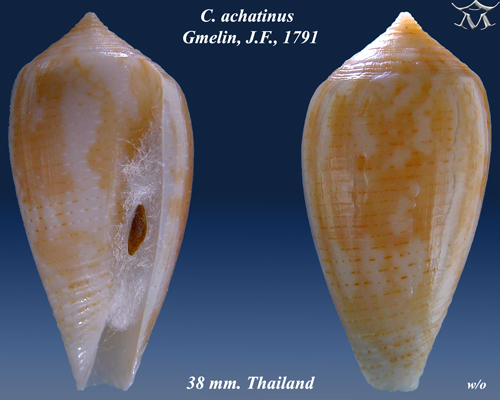
Conus achatinus Gmelin, J.F., 1791

These snails are predatory and venomous. They are capable of stinging humans, therefore live ones should be handled carefully or not at all.

== Description ==
The size of an adult shell varies between 35 mm and 100 mm. The shell is bulbous, with a somewhat elevated, lightly striated spire and rounded shoulders. The body whorl is rounded with convex sides, sometimes with granular striae below. The shell is pale blue, marbled with pinkish or purplish white and olivaceous-brown, under a light brown, thin epidermis, everywhere encircled by close-set narrow brown lines, which are usually broken up into brown and white articulations.

The varieties Conus achatinus var. infumata Dautzenberg, 1937 and Conus achatinus var. violacea Barros & C.M.I. Cunha, 1933 are accepted as Conus achatinus Gmelin, 1791

== Distribution ==
This species occurs in the Red Sea and in the Indian Ocean off the Mascarene Basin; in the Indo-West Pacific; off Australia (Northern Territory, Queensland, Western Australia). It is variable throughout its range.
