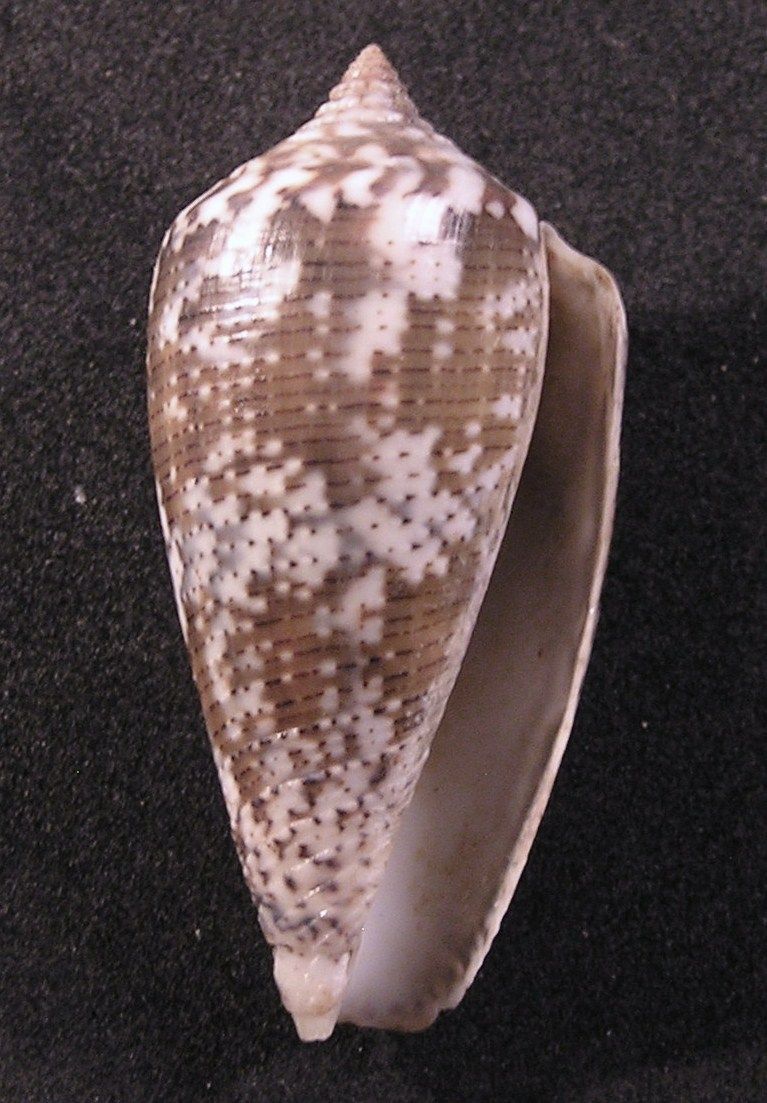
- Apertural view of a shell of Conus monachus

Conservation status
- Least Concern (IUCN 3.1)

Scientific classification
- Kingdom: Animalia
- Phylum: Mollusca
- Class: Gastropoda
- Subclass: Caenogastropoda
- Order: Neogastropoda
- Superfamily: Conoidea
- Family: Conidae
- Genus: Conus
- Species: C. monachus

Binomial name
- Conus monachus Linnaeus, 1758

Synonyms
- Conus (Pionoconus) monachus Linnaeus, 1758 · accepted, alternate representation; Conus contusus Reeve, 1848; Conus frostianus Brazier, 1898; Conus nebulosus Gmelin, 1791; Conus vinctus A. Adams, 1855; Cucullus cinerarius Röding, 1798; Cucullus guttatus Röding, 1798; Cucullus maculosus Röding, 1798; Pionoconus monachus (Linnaeus, 1758); Pionoconus vinctus (A. Adams, 1855)

= Conus monachus =

Species of sea snail

Conus monachus, common name the monastic cone, is a species of sea snail, a marine gastropod mollusk in the family Conidae, the cone snails, cone shells or cones.

These snails are predatory and venomous. They are capable of stinging humans.

== Description ==
The size of the shell varies between 18 mm (0.71 in) and 74 mm (2.9 in). The shell is a little inflated and distantly grooved below. The spire is striate and somewhat convex. The shell is white, longitudinally marbled and flecked with dull blue or purple. It captures its prey by using the "taser-and-tether" (harpoon) strategy. This means it stuns its prey by using venom and extends a proboscis from its rostrum and "hooks" the fish, the same way a harpoon would.

== Distribution and habitat ==
This marine species occurs in the Indo-Pacific. It is found in the neritic zone and resides in muddy sand and under rocks.
