= Conus arafurensis =

Scientific classification
- Kingdom: Animalia
- Phylum: Mollusca
- Class: Gastropoda
- Subclass: Caenogastropoda
- Order: Neogastropoda
- Superfamily: Conoidea
- Family: Conidae
- Genus: Conus
- Species: C. arafurensis

Binomial name
- Conus arafurensis (Monnier, Limpalaër & Robin, 2013)

Synonyms
- Conus (Pionoconus) arafurensis Monnier, Limpalaër & Robin, 2013 accepted, alternate representation; Pionoconus arafurensis Monnier, Limpalaër & Robin, 2013

Species of sea snail

Conus arafurensis is a species of sea snail, a marine gastropod mollusk in the family Conidae, the cone snails, cone shells or cones.

These snails are predatory and venomous. They are capable of stinging humans.

== Description ==
The size of the shell varies between 25 mm and 51 mm.

== Distribution ==
This species occurs in the Arafura Sea.
