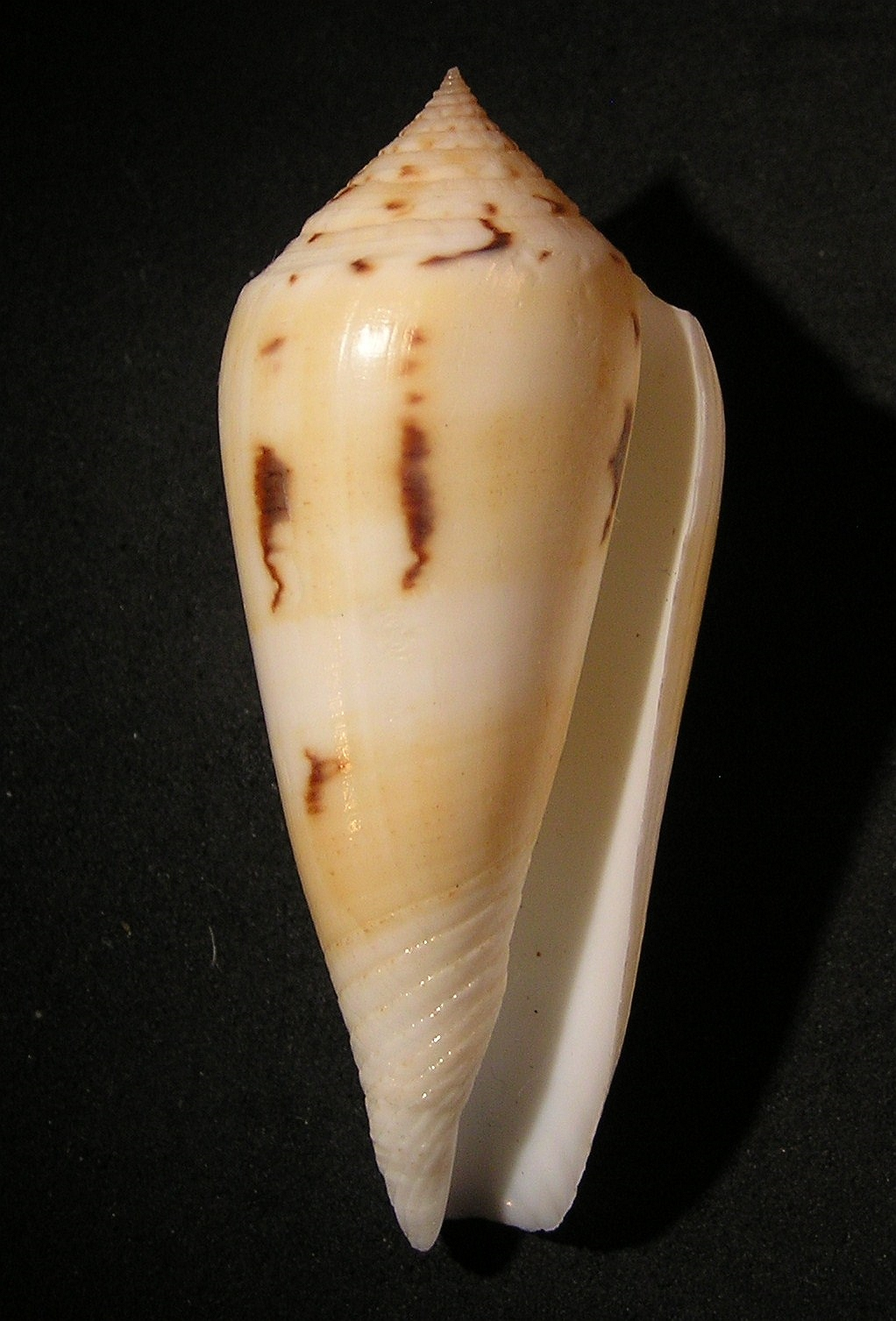
- Apertural view of Conus consors daullei

Conservation status
- Least Concern (IUCN 3.1)

Scientific classification
- Kingdom: Animalia
- Phylum: Mollusca
- Class: Gastropoda
- Subclass: Caenogastropoda
- Order: Neogastropoda
- Superfamily: Conoidea
- Family: Conidae
- Genus: Conus
- Species: C. consors

Binomial name
- Conus consors G. B. Sowerby I, 1833

Synonyms
- Conus (Pionoconus) consors G. B. Sowerby I, 1833 · accepted, alternate representation; Conus anceps A. Adams, 1855; Conus daullei Crosse, 1858; Conus innexus A. Adams, 1855; Conus poehlianus G. B. Sowerby III, 1887; Conus turschi da Motta, 1985; Pionoconus consors (G.B. Sowerby I, 1833)

= Conus consors =

Species of sea snail

Conus consors, common name the singed cone, is a species of sea snail, a marine gastropod mollusk in the family Conidae, the cone snails and their allies.

Like all species within the genus Conus, these snails are predatory and venomous. They are capable of stinging humans, therefore live ones should be handled carefully or not at all.

== Description ==
The size of an adult shell varies between 33 mm and 118 mm. The depressed spire is conical, with a shallow channel and revolving striae, sometimes tessellated with chestnut. The body whorl is rather narrow, somewhat convex, grooved towards the base, somewhat round-shouldered, rather thin. The color of the shell is white, yellowish and orange-brown, variously clouded and indistinctly banded. The aperture is white.

== Distribution ==
This marine species occurs in the Indo-West Pacific Region to the Marshall Islands, in Melanesia and off Queensland, Australia.
