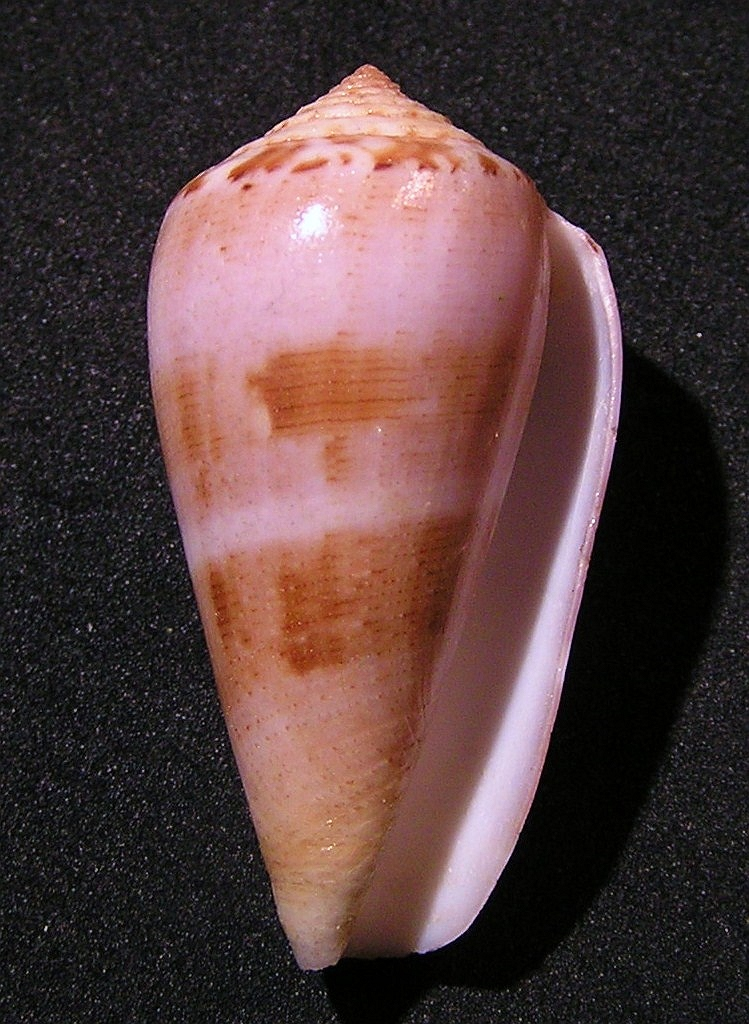
- Apertural view of a shell of Conus fulmen

Conservation status
- Least Concern (IUCN 3.1)

Scientific classification
- Kingdom: Animalia
- Phylum: Mollusca
- Class: Gastropoda
- Subclass: Caenogastropoda
- Order: Neogastropoda
- Superfamily: Conoidea
- Family: Conidae
- Genus: Conus
- Species: C. fulmen

Binomial name
- Conus fulmen Reeve, 1843

Synonyms
- Chelyconus fulmen (Reeve, 1843); Chelyconus fulmen kirai Kuroda, 1956; Conus (Pioconus) fulmen Reeve, 1843 accepted, alternate representation; Conus fulmen kirai Kuroda, 1956; Conus modestus G. B. Sowerby II, 1833 (name suppressed by ICZN Opinion 1699); Conus wistaria Shikama, 1970; Pionoconus fulmen (Reeve, 1843)

= Conus fulmen =

Species of sea snail

Conus fulmen, common name the thunderbolt cone, is a species of sea snail, a marine gastropod mollusk in the family Conidae, the cone snails and their allies.

Like all species within the genus Conus, these snails are predatory and venomous. They are capable of stinging humans, therefore live ones should be handled carefully or not at all.

== Description ==
The size of an adult shell varies from 45 mm and 80 mm.

The shell is somewhat elongately ovate, smooth and slightly grooved towards the base. The color of the shell is pale rose-purple, white round the middle; longitudinally marked with two or three very prominent, broad, waved, purple-brown streaks. The spire is obtusely convex, variegated with purple-brown. The apex is rose-tinted.

== Distribution ==
This marine species occurs off Vietnam and South Japan to the Ryukyus

== Gallery ==
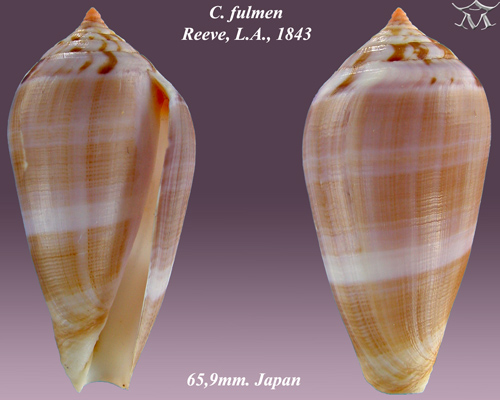
Conus fulmen Reeve, L.A., 1843

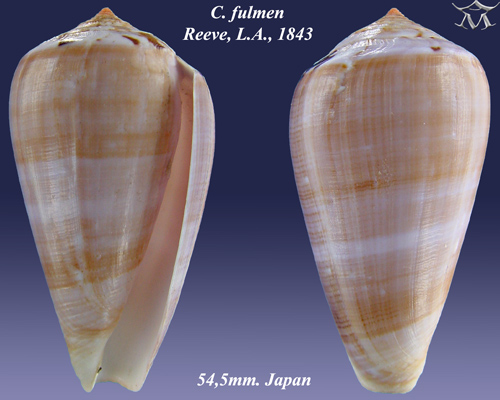
Conus fulmen Reeve, L.A., 1843
