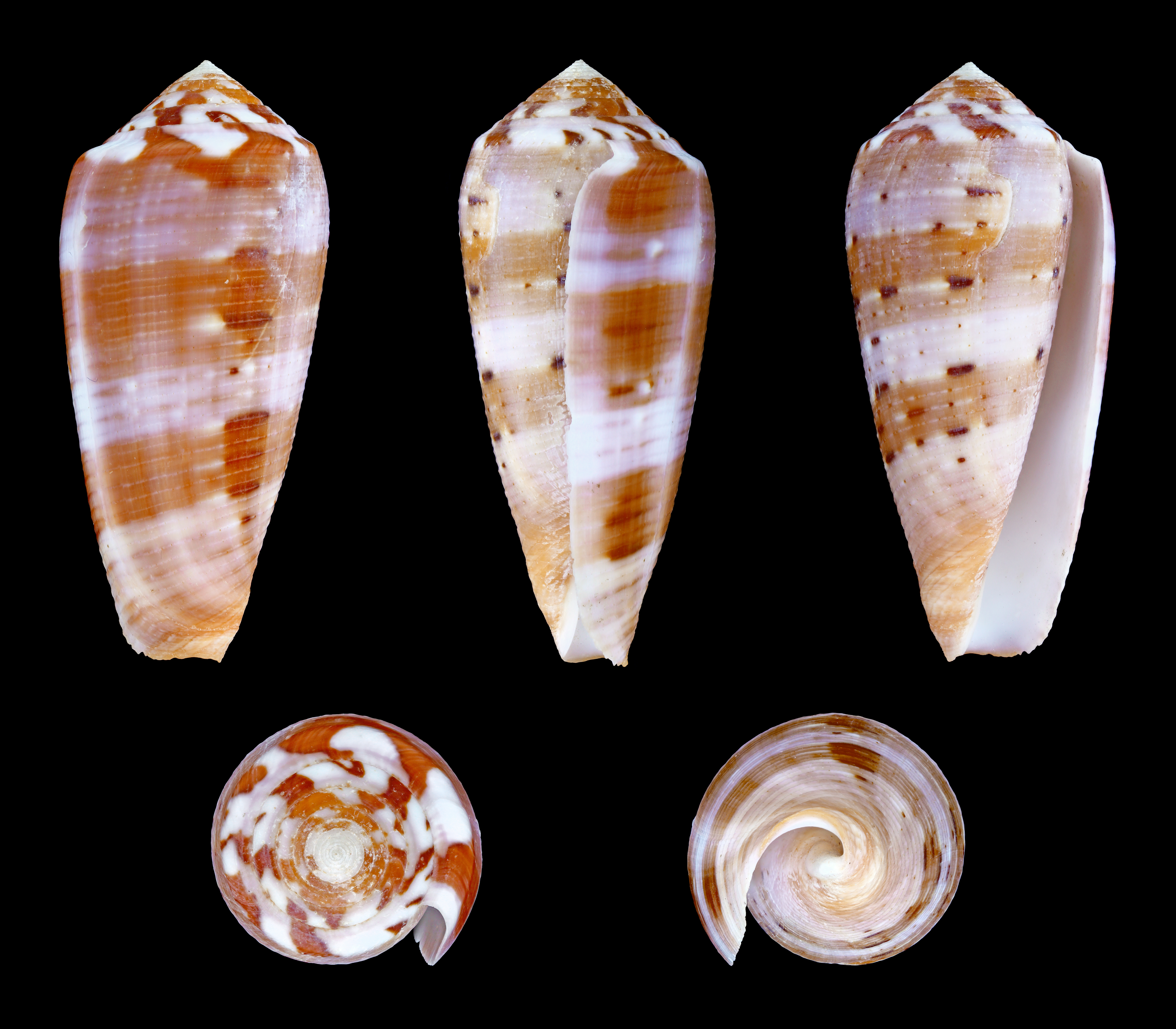
- Five views of a shell of Conus circumcisus Born, I. von, 1778

Conservation status
- Least Concern (IUCN 3.1)

Scientific classification
- Kingdom: Animalia
- Phylum: Mollusca
- Class: Gastropoda
- Subclass: Caenogastropoda
- Order: Neogastropoda
- Superfamily: Conoidea
- Family: Conidae
- Genus: Conus
- Species: C. circumcisus

Binomial name
- Conus circumcisus Born, 1778

Synonyms
- Conus (Pionoconus) circumcisus Born, 1778 accepted, alternate representation; Conus affinis Gmelin, 1791; Conus brazieri G. B. Sowerby III, 1881; Conus dux Hwass in Bruguière, 1792; Conus terebellum Röding, 1798; Conus unicolor G. B. Sowerby I, 1833; Cucullus purpuratus Röding, 1798; Cucullus terebellum Röding, 1798; Pionoconus circumcisus (Born, 1778)

= Conus circumcisus =

Species of sea snail

Conus circumcisus, common names the circumcision cone or the auger cone, the borer shell, or the leader cone, is a species of sea snail, a marine gastropod mollusk in the family Conidae, the cone snails and their allies.

Like all species within the genus Conus, these snails are predatory and venomous. They are capable of stinging humans, therefore live ones should be handled carefully or not at all.

== Description ==
The thin shell is striated throughout. The color of the shell is yellowish or violaceous white, clouded.with chestnut, with distant revolving series of chestnut spots and short lines, most conspicuous on two irregular lighter bands.

The shell of Conus brazieri G. B. Sowerby III, 1881 is rather solid, with revolving striae throughout. Its color is whitish, tinged with pale rose-pink, with two broad, light yellowish brown bands, sprinkled here and there with a few very minute brown spots. The spire is conspicuously marked with dark brown blotches.

Shell size 75 mm.

== Distribution ==
This marine species occurs in the Pacific Ocean off the Moluccas, the Philippines, the Marshall Islands, Solomon Islands and Vanuatu; off Australia (the Northern Territory and Western Australia)

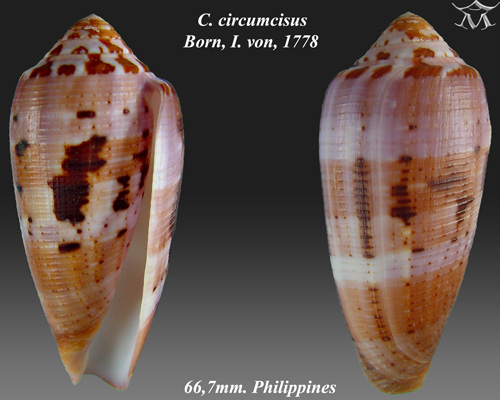
Conus circumcisus Born, I. von, 1778

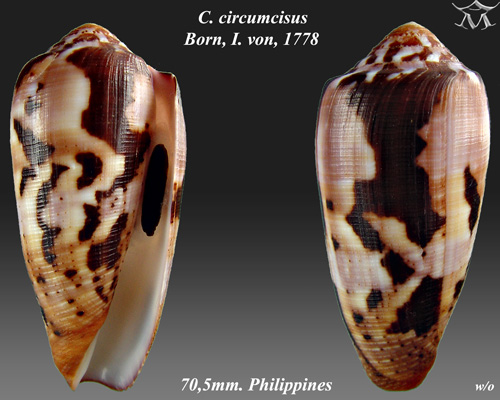
Conus circumcisus Born, I. von, 1778

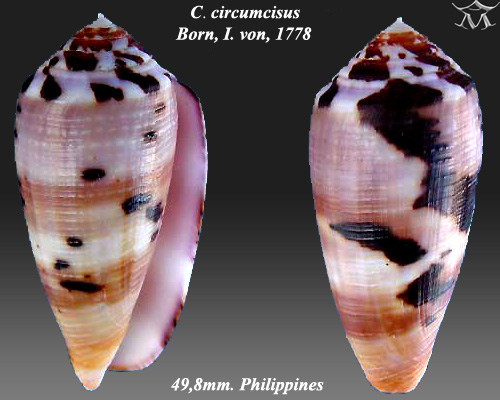
Conus circumcisus Born, I. von, 1778

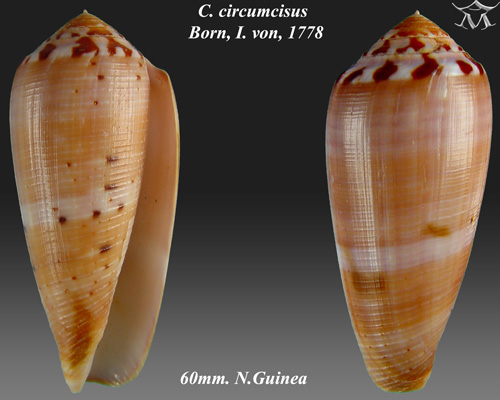
Conus circumcisus Born, I. von, 1778
