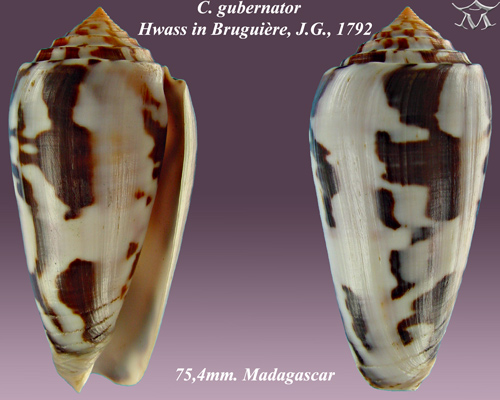
- Apertural and abapertural views of shell of Conus gubernator Hwass in Bruguière, J.G., 1792

Scientific classification
- Kingdom: Animalia
- Phylum: Mollusca
- Class: Gastropoda
- Subclass: Caenogastropoda
- Order: Neogastropoda
- Superfamily: Conoidea
- Family: Conidae
- Genus: Conus
- Species: C. gubernator

Binomial name
- Conus gubernator Hwass in Bruguière, 1792

Synonyms
- Conus (Pionoconus) gubernator Hwass in Bruguière, 1792 · accepted, alternate representation; Conus boivini Kiener, 1845; Conus leehmani da Motta & Röckel, 1979; Conus sutoreanus da Motta & Röckel, 1979; Conus sutorianus Weinkauff, 1874; Conus terminus Lamarck, 1822; Conus veillardi da Motta, 1990; Pionoconus gubernator (Hwass in Bruguière, 1792)

= Conus gubernator =

Species of sea snail

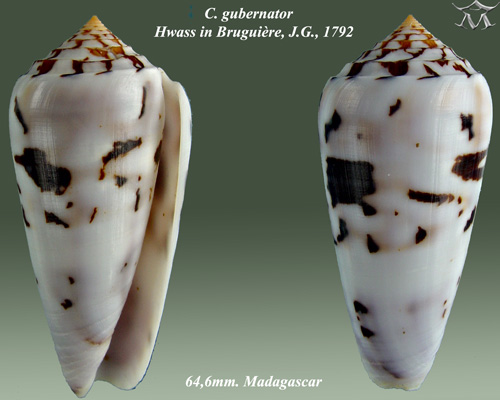
Conus gubernator Hwass in Bruguière, J.G., 1792

Conus gubernator, common name the governor cone, is a species of sea snail, a marine gastropod mollusk in the family Conidae, the cone snails and their allies.

Like all species within the genus Conus, these snails are predatory and venomous. They are capable of stinging humans, therefore live ones should be handled carefully or not at all.

== Description ==
The size of the shell varies between 50 mm and 106 mm. The whorls of the spire are carinate, channeled and striate. They are tessellated with chestnut. The body whorl is pink-white, longitudinally clouded with chestnut or chocolate, often obscurely two-banded. There are several distant sulci towards the base.

== Distribution ==
This marine species occurs in the Western Indian Ocean off Madagascar, Tanzania, Mauritius, Chagos and the Mascarene Basin.

== Gallery ==
Below are several color forms:

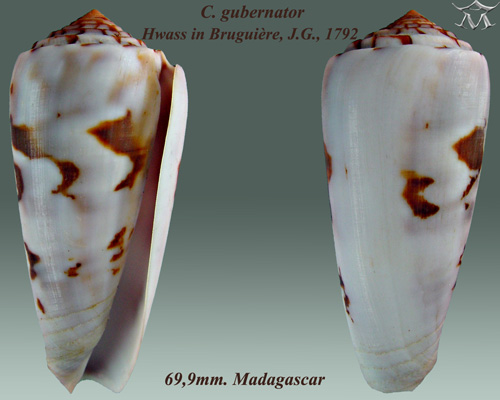
Conus gubernator Hwass in Bruguière, J.G., 1792

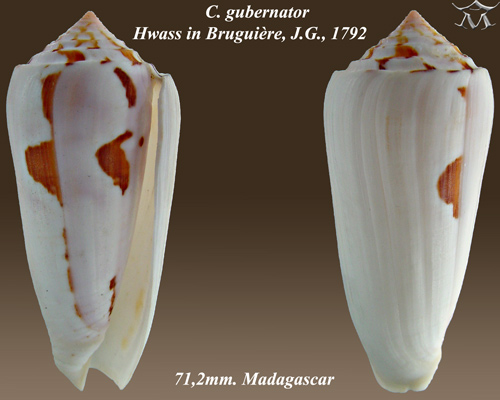
Conus gubernator Hwass in Bruguière, J.G., 1792

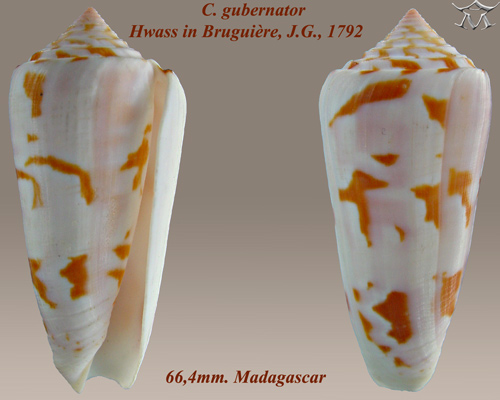
Conus gubernator Hwass in Bruguière, J.G., 1792

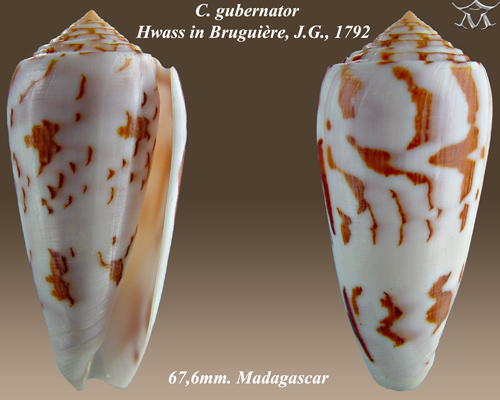
Conus gubernator Hwass in Bruguière, J.G., 1792

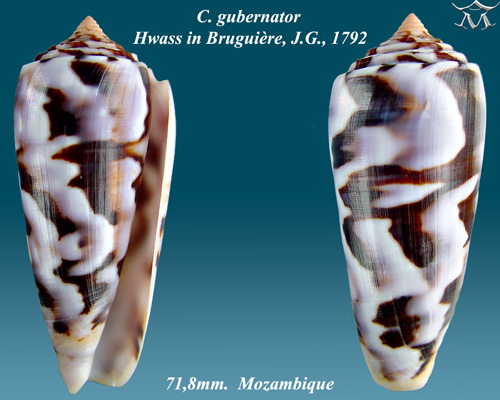
Conus gubernator Hwass in Bruguière, J.G., 1792

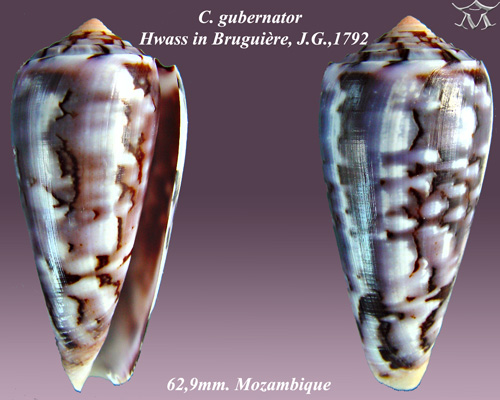
Conus gubernator Hwass in Bruguière, J.G., 1792

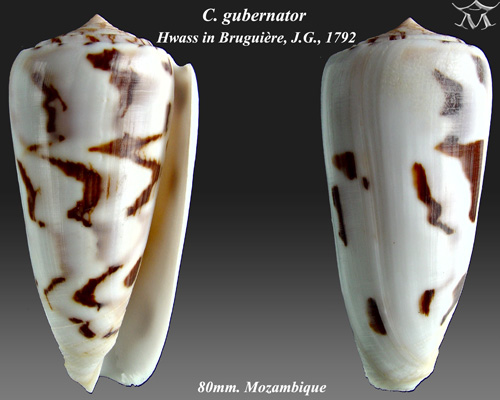
Conus gubernator Hwass in Bruguière, J.G., 1792

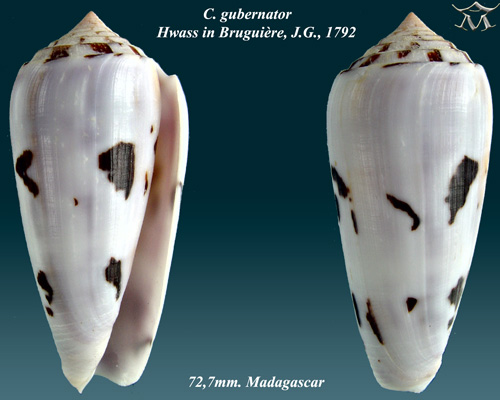
Conus gubernator Hwass in Bruguière, J.G., 1792

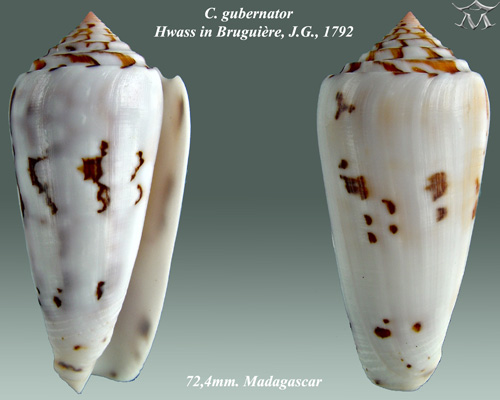
Conus gubernator Hwass in Bruguière, J.G., 1792

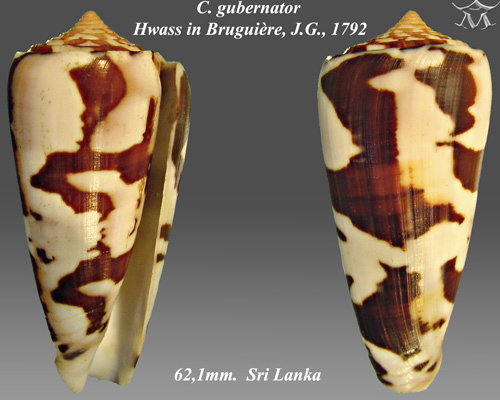
Conus gubernator Hwass in Bruguière, J.G., 1792
