= Hermes (disambiguation) =

Hermes is a god in Greek mythology.

Hermes may also refer to:

== Arts, entertainment and media ==
=== Fictional characters ===
- Hermes (Harry Potter), Percy Weasley's owl
- Hermes (Marvel Comics)
- Hermes Conrad, in the animated TV series Futurama
- Hermes, a talking motorcycle in the anime Kino's Journey
- Hermès Costello, in the manga Stone Ocean
- Hermes, in Hermes & Renato, a Brazilian comedy troupe
- Hermes, in the 2013 video game Goodbye Deponia

=== Other uses ===
- Hermes (classical philology journal), a German periodical founded in 1866
- Hermes (publication), a literary journal published by the University of Sydney Union
- Hermes (sculpture), Milwaukee, Wisconsin, U.S.
- Hermes Records, an Iranian record label
- Hermes (fictional spacecraft), in the novel and film The Martian

== Businesses ==
- Hermès, a French luxury-goods manufacturer
- Hermes Airlines, a Greek airline 2011–2016
- Hermes Aviation, a Maltese airline 2014-2015
- Hermes Europe, a German delivery company
- EFG Hermes, an Egyptian financial services company
- Federated Hermes, an American investment manager
- Hermes Investment Management, a fund manager subsidiary of Federated Hermes
- Hermes Press, an American publisher

== Military ==
- HMS Hermes, the name of several ships of the British Royal Navy
- Hermes-class post ship, a class of Royal Navy sailing ships built in the early 19th century
- Hermes-class sloop, a Royal Navy class of four paddlewheel steam sloops built in the 1830s
- USS Hermes, later USS Lanikai, a yacht commissioned into the United States Navy in World Wars I and II
- Hermes program, an American missile development program (1944–1954)
- Hermes (missile), a family of Russian guided missiles
- Operation Hermes (disambiguation), the name of several events
- Elbit Hermes 90, an Israeli unmanned aerial vehicle (UAV)
- Elbit Hermes 450, an Israeli UAV
- Elbit Hermes 900, an Israeli UAV

== People and legendary figures ==
- Hermes (given name), including a list of people and legendary figures with the name
- Hermes (surname), including a list of people with the name

== Places ==
- Hermes, Oise, France
- Hermes Glacier, Antarctica
- Hermes Point, Antarctica

== Science and technology ==
=== Aerospace ===
- Cirrus Hermes, a British 1930s aero engine
- Hermes (satellite), a failed American satellite
- Hermes (spacecraft), a proposed European spaceplane

=== Astronomy ===
- 69230 Hermes, an asteroid
- HERMES, an instrument fitted to the Anglo-Australian Telescope
- the ancient Greek name for the planet Mercury
- Popular Astronomy (UK magazine), called Hermes until 1981

=== Biology ===
- Hermes (gastropod), a subgenus of molluscs

=== Computing ===
- Hermes Agent
- Hermes (BBS), bulletin board software
- Hermes (programming language), developed by IBM
- Hermes Project, a C++/Python library of algorithms
- Hermes, a converter for mass spectrometry data formats
- Hermes, codename of the ORiNOCO family of wireless networking technology

=== Other science and technology ===
- HERMES experiment, a particle physics experiment
- Hotspot Ecosystems Research on the Margins of European Seas (HERMES), a deep-sea multidisciplinary project
- Hermes protocol, a machine-to-machine communication standard used in the SMT assembly industry
- HTC Hermes, or HTC TyTN, a personal digital assistant
- Hermes, a brand of typewriters, including the Hermes 3000

== Sports ==
- Hermes DVS, a Dutch multi-sport club
- Hermes F.C., a Scottish football club
- Kokkolan Hermes, a Finnish ice hockey team
- Hermes Ladies' Hockey Club, an Irish field hockey club

== Transportation ==
- Hermes Road Measurement System
- Handley Page Hermes, a 1940s/1950s British airliner
- MV Hermes, later MV Pozarica, a cargo ship launched in 1945

== Other uses ==
- HERMES method, a project management method developed by the Swiss government

== See also ==
- Hermis, an American racehorse foaled in 1899
- Ermes (disambiguation)
- Hermus (disambiguation)
- Hermaeus, a 1st century BC Indo-Greek king
- Hermeus, an American startup company
