= Conus (Hermes) =

- Apertural view of shell of Conus nussatella Linnaeus, 1758 collected off Dar es Salaam, Tanzania

Scientific classification
- Kingdom: Animalia
- Phylum: Mollusca
- Class: Gastropoda
- Subclass: Caenogastropoda
- Order: Neogastropoda
- Family: Conidae
- Genus: Conus
- Subgenus: Hermes; Montfort, 1810

Type species
- Conus nussatella Linnaeus, 1758

Synonyms
- Hermes Montfort, 1810

Subgenus of gastropods

Hermes is a subgenus of sea snails, marine gastropod molluscs in the family Conidae, the cone snails and their allies.

In the new classification of the family Conidae by Puillandre N., Duda T.F., Meyer C., Olivera B.M. & Bouchet P. (2015), Hermes has become a subgenus of Conus: Conus (Hermes) Montfort, 1810 (type species: Conus nussatella Linnaeus, 1758) represented as Conus Thiele, 1929

== Distinguishing characteristics ==
The Tucker & Tenorio 2009 taxonomy distinguishes Hermes from Conus in the following ways:

- Genus Conus sensu stricto Linnaeus, 1758

Shell characters (living and fossil species)

The basic shell shape is conical to elongated conical, has a deep anal notch on the shoulder, a smooth periostracum and a small operculum. The shoulder of the shell is usually nodulose and the protoconch is usually multispiral. Markings often include the presence of tents except for black or white color variants, with the absence of spiral lines of minute tents and textile bars.

Radular tooth (not known for fossil species)

The radula has an elongated anterior section with serrations and a large exposed terminating cusp, a non-obvious waist, blade is either small or absent and has a short barb, and lacks a basal spur.

Geographical distribution

These species are found in the Indo-Pacific region.

Feeding habits

These species eat other gastropods including cones.

- Subgenus Hermes Montfort, 1810

Shell characters (living and fossil species)

The shell is elongated and subcylindrical in shape with a tubular body whorl. The protoconch is multispiral. The anal notch is shallow. The shoulders are rounded to subangular. The shell is ornamented with nodules which die out in the early spire whorls, two or more cords on the whorl tops, and well developed ridges on the body whorl. The periostracum is smooth, and the operculum is small.

Radular tooth (not known for fossil species)

The anterior section of the radular tooth is shorter than the length of the posterior section, and the blade is long and may cover the full length of the anterior section. A basal spur is present, the barb is short. The radular tooth has serrations, and a terminating cusp.

Geographical distribution

The species in this genus occur in the Indo-Pacific region, including Australia.

Feeding habits

The radular tooth suggests that these cone snails are vermivorous, meaning that the cones prey on polychaete worms, however Hermes nussatellus has been reported to feed on mollusks.

== Species list ==
This list of species is based on the information in the World Register of Marine Species (WoRMS) list. Species within the genus Hermes include:

- Hermes nussatella (Linnaeus, 1758): synonym of Conus (Hermes) nussatella Linnaeus, 1758 represented as Conus nussatella Linnaeus, 1758

The following species have become synonyms of other subgenera of Conus or Conasprella.

- Hermes artoptus (G.B. Sowerby I, 1833): synonym of Conus artoptus G.B. Sowerby I, 1833
- Hermes austroviola (Röckel & Korn, 1992): synonym of Conus austroviola Röckel & Korn, 1992
- Hermes kawanishii Shikama, 1970: synonym of Conus nussatella Linnaeus, 1758
- Hermes lizarum Raybaudi Massilia & da Motta, 1992: synonym of Conasprella lizarum (Raybaudi Massilia & da Motta, 1992)
- Hermes terryni (Tenorio & Poppe, 2004): synonym of Conus terryni Tenorio & Poppe, 2004
- Hermes triggi Cotton, 1945: synonym of Conasprella ximenes (Gray, 1839)
- Hermes viola (Cernohorsky, 1977): synonym of Conus viola Cernohorsky, 1977
- Hermes violaceus (Gmelin, 1791): synonym of Conus violaceus Gmelin, 1791
