= Hermus (disambiguation) =

Hermus is the name of several figures in Greek mythology.

Hermus or Hermos (Ancient Greek: Ἕρμος) may also refer to:

- Hermus or Hermos, ancient name of the Gediz River, now in Turkey
- Hermus (Attica), an ancient town of Attica, Greece
- Hermus (surname), several people

== See also ==
- Hermeus (aerospace startup)
- Hermes (disambiguation)
