= SMEMA =

Surface mount equipment manufacturers association

SMEMA is an acronym for the Surface Mount Equipment Manufacturers Association.

In 1999 they merged with the IPC to form the IPC SMEMA Council.

One standard they have is for the wiring of communications between Surface mount technology producing machinery such as a Stencil Printer or a Pick and Place Machine on an Electronics production line. This allows the machines, including the "bridges" between the two known simply as conveyors, to communicate that they are busy, or awaiting a circuit board. The communication only goes sequentially, as there is no addressing. Instead the machine's SMEMA cables connect to each other's upstream or downstream plug. The plugs and wires are multimate connectors and receptacles consisting of 14 wire connections. However, only 4 wires are used for data, while the 8th pin connection is the shielding.

== History ==
In 1984 a group of North American capital equipment suppliers started their collaboration to develop the original SMEMA specification. No formal document was available until 1987. Core companies credited with founding of SMEMA are Dynapert, Zevatech, Universal Instruments, MPM and BTU. Core members include Ernest Roberts (Dynapert), Robert Black (Zevatech), Patrick Torigian (Universal Instruments) and Gary Freeman (MPM).

The current version of the standard is IPC/SMEMA 9851–2007, published in February 2007, which superseded version 1.2.

In April 2017 the Hermes protocol was released as an intended upgrade to and replacement of SMEMA. By the end of 2018 IPC has confirmed to recognize The Hermes Standard to be the successor to “the SMEMA Standard” IPC-SMEMA-9851, which has been the only globally accepted and broadly established standard for machine to machine communication in SMT with regards to PCB handover. Accordingly, The Hermes Standard was assigned an IPC naming code: It can now officially be referred to as IPC-HERMES-9852.

=== Specifications ===
The specifications are for single board transfer systems with conveyors as the transporters. Specifications state that the boards should be moving from left to right although the same standard does apply to board transfers going right to left. For proper sequencing of boards, two signal lines should be used; "Board Available" and "Machine Ready", the signal "Failed Board Available" is optional

Conveyor Height: Each machine shall have the transport conveyor height adjustable from 940 to 965mm (37 to 38 in) from the floor to the bottom of the PC board.

Fixed Rail: For the purpose of the standard, the front rail is defined as the fixed rail.

Tooling Pins: Tooling pins, if used, should be on the front edge of the board (next to the fixed transport rail). A recommended hole diameter is 4mm (0.157 in) Distance from the edge should be 7.6mm (0.299 in).
