= Jessie and John F. Kern House =

German Renaissance Revival style home

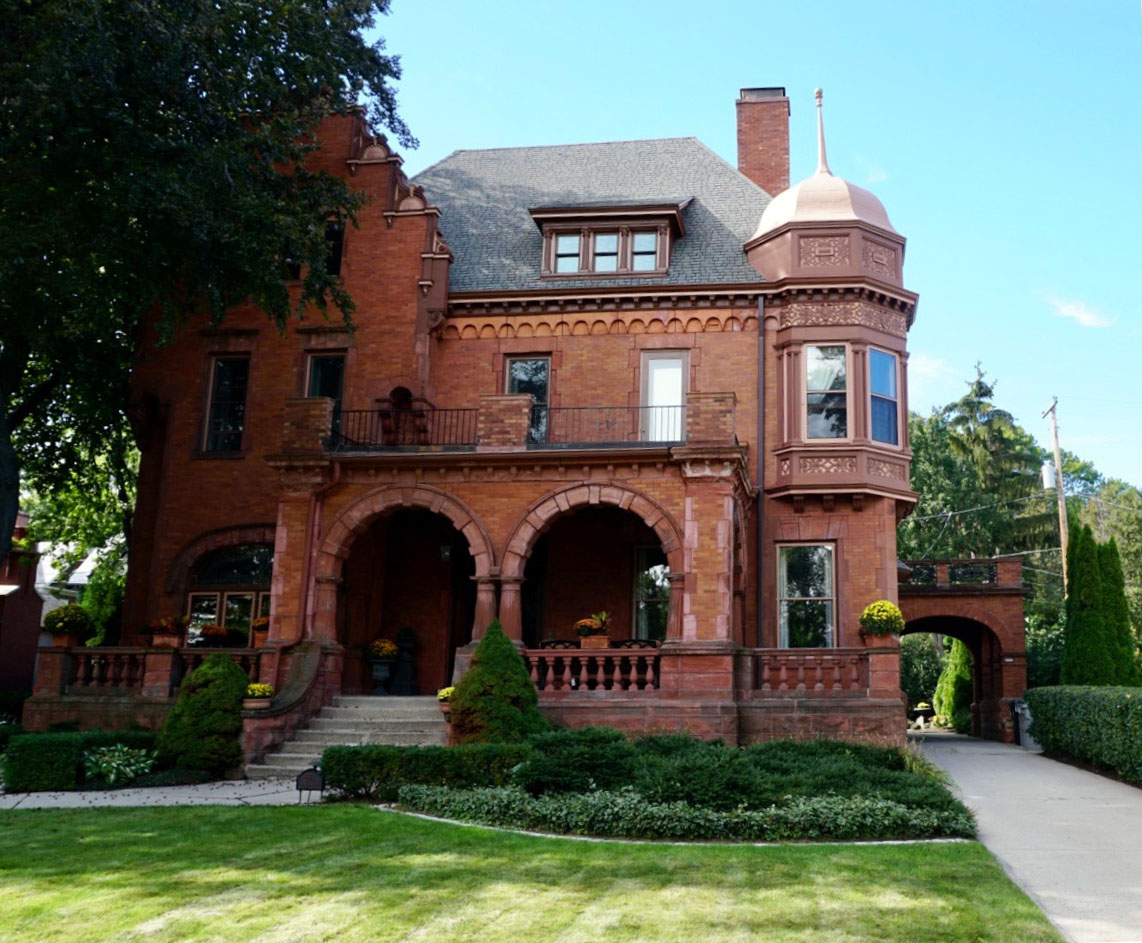
- John Kern Mansion
- Interactive map of Jessie and John F. Kern House
- 43.063611°N 87.874167°W
- Location: 2569 N Wahl Ave, Milwaukee, WI 53211
- Nearest city: Milwaukee, Wisconsin

History
- Built: 1900
- Built for: Wisconsin industrialist John Kern
- Original use: Home

Site notes
- Area: 5,686 square feet
- Architect(s): Crane & Barkhausen
- Architectural style: German Renaissance Revival
- Governing body: Wisconsin Historical Society
- Owner: Jeffery and Karin Hembrock

The Jessie and John F. Kern House is a German Renaissance Revival style mansion completed in 1900. The home was built for Wisconsin Industrialist John Kern. The home is located in Milwaukee, Wisconsin in the Gilman's Subdivision of Part of Lockwood's Addition in the North Point North Historic District. The home was completed in 1900 and was listed in the Wisconsin state register July 16, 1999, and added to the National Register March 24, 2000.

== History ==
John Kern purchased the land on Park Avenue in 1899 and in August 1899, it was reported in the local news that Kern would build the home at cost between $20,000 and $25,000 (approximately $659,197.59 to $751,557.69 in 2021 dollars). The building was to be constructed with stone and brick and Crane & Barkhausen were to be the architects. The Krueger family bought the home in the 1930s. In the 1950s the home was converted into a duplex. In subsequent years the home was remodeled and repurposed and now it survives as a historic masion.

== Architectural elements ==
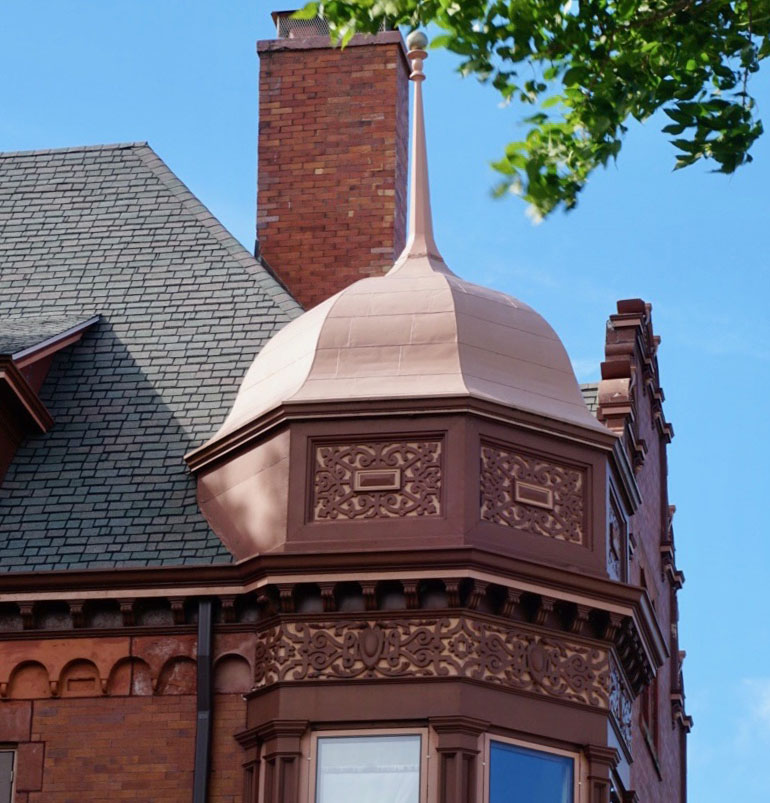
Cupola on the Jessie and John F. Kern House

The building is an example of German Renaissance Revival style. The building is considered a villa. The wealthy Germans in the Milwaukee area built many homes in the style. The home has a brick facade and arcaded corbeling which are typical of this German revival style. The ornamental iron work was done by Cyril Colnik. The home is considered to be one of the first to have zoned air conditioning system. The home has 16 rooms: five bedrooms, four and a half baths. The front of the building features an octagonal bartizan. The front porch has large stone arches. The interior of the home has stained glass windows in every room, woodwork throughout and a multiple fireplaces. The floors are adorned with beautiful inlaid wood. The home's parlor is replete with Honduran mahogany.

== See also ==
- National Register of Historic Places listings in Milwaukee, Wisconsin
