= Hotspot Ecosystem Research and Man's Impact On European Seas =

International multidisciplinary project that studies deep-sea ecosystems

HERMIONE project logo

Hotspot Ecosystem Research and Man's Impact On European Seas (HERMIONE) is an international multidisciplinary project, started in April 2009, that studies deep-sea ecosystems. HERMIONE scientists study the distribution of hotspot ecosystems, how they function and how they interconnect, partially in the context of how these ecosystems are being affected by climate change and impacted by humans through overfishing, resource extraction, seabed installations (oil platforms, etc.) and pollution. Major aims of the project are to understand how humans are affecting the deep-sea environment and to provide policy makers with accurate scientific information, enabling effective management strategies to protect deep sea ecosystems. The HERMIONE project is funded by the European Commission's Seventh Framework Programme, and is the successor to the HERMES project, which concluded in March 2009.

== Introduction ==
Europe's deep-ocean margin, from the Arctic to the Iberian Margin, and across the Mediterranean to the Black Sea, spans a distance of over 15,000 km and hosts a number of diverse habitats and ecosystems. Deep water coral reefs, undersea mountains populated by a multitude of organisms, vast submarine canyon systems, and hydrothermal vents are some of the features contained therein. The traditional view of the deep-sea realm as a hostile and barren place was discredited long ago, and scientists now know that much of Europe's deep sea is rich and diverse.

However, the deep sea is increasingly threatened by humans: most of this deep-ocean frontier lies within Europe's Exclusive Economic Zone (EEZ) and has significant potential for the exploitation of biological, energy, and mineral resources. Research and exploration over the last two decades has shown clear signs of direct and indirect anthropogenic impacts in the deep sea, resulting from such activities as overfishing, littering and pollution. This raises concerns because deep-sea processes and ecosystems are not only important for the marine web of life, but also fundamentally contribute to the global biogeochemical cycle.

The knowledge obtained by the HERMES project (EC FP6), has contributed to our understanding of deep-sea ecosystems. The HERMIONE project investigates ecosystems at critical sites on Europe's deep-ocean margin, aiming to make major advances in knowledge of their distribution and functioning, and their contribution to ecosystem goods and services. HERMIONE places emphasis on the human impact on the deep sea, and on the translation of scientific information into science policy for the sustainable use of marine resources. To achieve this, HERMIONE uses an integrated interdisciplinary approach; experts in biology, ecology, biodiversity, oceanography, geology, sedimentology, geophysics, and biogeochemistry, will work alongside socio-economists and policy-makers.

== Hotspot research ==
The HERMIONE project focuses on deep-sea "hotspot" ecosystems including submarine canyons, open slopes and deep basins, chemosynthetic environments, deep water coral reefs, and seamounts. Hotspot ecosystems support high species diversity, numbers of individuals, or both, and are therefore important in maintaining margin-wide biodiversity and abundance. HERMIONE research ranges from investigation of the ecosystems' dimensions, distribution, interconnection and functioning, to understanding the potential impacts of climate change and anthropogenic disturbance. The ultimate objective is to provide stakeholders and policymakers with the scientific knowledge necessary to support deep-sea governance, sustainable management and conservation of these ecosystems.

To obtain the data needed, HERMIONE scientists are spending over 1000 days at sea, using more than 50 research vessels across Europe. Sharing vessels and equipment between partners will help through shared knowledge, expertise and data, and will also maximize the research effort, increasing efficiency and productivity. Technology will be used, with Remotely Operated Vehicles (ROVs) one of the critical pieces of equipment being used for a wide range of maneuvers and surveys, from precision sampling of methane gas at cold seeps to microbathymetry mapping to examine the structure of the seabed. Large arrays of instrumented moorings, shared by different partner institutions, will be deployed in experimental areas, allowing HERMIONE to develop experimental strategies beyond any national capacity.

=== Study areas ===
Map of HERMIONE areas of scientific research

The HERMIONE study sites were selected on the following basis:

- The Arctic because of its importance in monitoring climate change;
- Nordic margin with abundant cold-water corals, extensive hydrocarbon exploration and the Haakon-Mosby mud volcano (HMMV) natural laboratory;
- Celtic margin with a mid-latitude canyon, cold water corals and the long term Porcupine Abyssal Plain (PAP) monitoring site;
- Portuguese margin with the highly diverse Nazare and Setubal canyons;
- Seamounts in the Atlantic and western Mediterranean as important biodiversity hotspots potentially under threat;
- Mid Atlantic Ridge (MAR) ESONET site to link cold seep to hot seep chemosynthetic studies;
- Mediterranean cold water cascading sites in the Gulf of Lions and outflows of the Adriatic and Aegean Seas.

The HMMV, PAP, MAR and central Mediterranean sites link to the ESONET long-term monitoring sites and will provide valuable background information.

== Hotspot ecosystems ==
=== Cold-water coral reefs ===
Deep water coral reefs are found along the northeast Atlantic and central Mediterranean margins, and are important biodiversity hotspots. The recent HERMES project lists more than 2000 species associated with cold-water coral reefs worldwide. As well as flourishing live coral, the dead coral frameworks and rubble that are frequently found close by attract a myriad of fauna from the microscopic to the mega, and may be fundamental in coral ecosystem replenishment. Coral reefs provide a habitat for fish, a refuge from predators, a rich food source, a nursery for young fish, and are also potential sources of a wide range of medicines to treat ailments from cancer to cardiovascular disease.

There are several known coral hotspot areas on Europe's deep-ocean margin, including the Scandinavian, Rockall-Porcupine and central Mediterranean margins, and there remain many questions about them, such as how each of the sites are connected to one another, how they arose, what drives the distribution of the reefs, how the larvae disperse and settle, how the corals and associated species reproduce, finding their physiological thresholds, how they will fare with increased ocean warming, and whether ocean warming induces a spread of coral reefs further north into the Arctic Ocean. New research will also build on previous work to define the physical environment around cold-water coral reefs such as hydrodynamic and sedimentary regimes, which will help to understand biological responses.

HERMIONE scientists use cutting-edge technology to try to answer these questions. High-resolution mapping of the seafloor will be carried out to determine the location and distribution of cold-water corals, and photographic observations will be made to assess changes in the status of known reefs over time, such as their response to climatic variation or their recovery from destruction by fishing trawlers. To assess biodiversity and its relationship with environmental factors such as climate change, DNA barcoding and other molecular techniques will be used.

=== Submarine canyons ===
Submarine canyons are deep, steep-sided valleys that form on continental margins. Stretching from the shelf to the deep sea, they dissect much of the European margin. They are one of the most complex seascapes known to humans; their rugged topography and challenging environmental conditions mean that they are also one of the least explored. Advances in technology over the last two decades have allowed scientists to uncover some of the mysteries of canyons, the size of which often rival the Grand Canyon, USA.

One of the most important discoveries is that canyons are major sources and sinks for sediment and organic matter on continental margins. They act as fast-track pathways for sediment and organic matter from the shelf to the deep sea, and can act as temporary depots for sediment and carbon storage. Particle flux through canyons has been found to be between two and four times greater than on the open slope, though the transfer of particles through canyons is thought to be largely "event-driven", which introduces a highly variable aspect to canyon conditions. Determining what drives sediment transport and deposition within canyons is one of the major challenges for HERMIONE.

The capacity of canyons to focus and concentrate organic matter can promote high abundances and diversity of fauna. However, variability in environmental conditions and topography is very high, both within and between canyons, and this is reflected in the variability of the structure and dynamics of the biological communities. Our understanding of biological processes in canyons has greatly improved with the use of submersibles and ROVs, but this research has also revealed that the relationships between fauna and canyons are more complex than previously thought. The diversity of submarine canyons and their fauna means that it is difficult to make generalisations that can be used to create policies for canyon ecosystem management. It is important that the role of canyons in maintaining biodiversity, and how potential anthropogenic impacts may affect this, is better understood. HERMIONE will address this challenge by examining canyon ecosystems from different biogeochemical provinces and topographic settings, in light of the complex interactions among habitat (topography, water masses, currents), mass and energy transfer, and biological communities.

=== Open slopes and deep basins ===
Open slopes and deep basins comprise > 90% of the ocean floor and 65% of the Earth's surface, and many of the goods and services provided by the deep sea (e.g., oil, gas, climate regulation and food) are produced and stored by them. They are involved in global biogeochemical and ecological processes, and are essential for the functioning of the biosphere and human wellbeing.

Recent research in the HERMES (EC-FP6) project gathered a large body of information on local biodiversity at large scales, different latitudes and in different hotspot ecosystems, but the research also highlighted the high degree of complexity of deep-sea habitats. This information is fundamental to our understanding of the factors that control biodiversity at much larger scales, from hundreds to thousands of kilometres. HERMIONE will conduct further studies on the mosaic of habitats found in deep-sea slopes and basins, and will investigate the relationships within and between these habitats, their biodiversity and ecology, and their interconnection with other hotspot ecosystems.

Investigating the impacts of anthropogenic activities and climate change in the deep sea is a theme that runs through all HERMIONE research. To the biological communities on open slopes and in deep basins, seafloor warming through climate change is a major threat. Up to 85% of methane reservoirs along the continental margin could be destabilised, which would not only release climate-warming methane gas into the atmosphere, but would also have unknown and potentially devastating consequences on benthic communities. The role of climatic variation on deep-sea benthos is not well understood, although large-scale changes in the structure of seafloor communities have been observed over the last two decades. The use of long-term, deep-sea observatories, e.g., the Hausgarten deep-sea observatory in the Arctic and the time-series analysis of the Catalan margin and Southern Adriatic Sea, will help HERMIONE scientists to examine recent changes in benthic communities, and to study decadal variability in physical processes, such as the dense shelf water cascading events in submarine canyons.

HERMIONE aims to provide quantitative estimates of the potential consequences of biodiversity loss on ecosystem functioning, to examine how deep-sea benthos adapt to large-scale changes, and, for the first time, to create conceptual models integrating deep-sea biodiversity and quantitative analyses of ecosystem functioning and processes.

=== Seamounts ===
Seamounts are underwater mountains that rise from the depths of the ocean, and whose summits can sometimes be found just a few hundred metres below the sea surface. To be classified as a seamount the summit must be 1000 m higher than the surrounding seafloor, and under this definition there are an estimated 1000–2800 seamounts in the Atlantic Ocean and around 60 in the Mediterranean Sea.

Seamounts enhance water flow through localised tides, eddies, and upwelling, and these physical processes may enhance primary production. Seamounts may therefore be considered as hotspots of marine life; fauna benefit from the enhanced hydrodynamics and phytoplankton supply, and thrive on the slopes and summits. Suspension feeders, such as gorgonian sea fans and the cold-water corals like Lophelia pertusa, often dominate the rich benthic (seafloor-dwelling) communities. The enhanced abundance and diversity of fauna is not limited to benthic species, as fish are known to aggregate over seamounts. Unfortunately, this knowledge has led to increasing commercial exploitation of seamount fish by the fishing industry, and a number of seamount fish populations have already been depleted. Part of HERMIONE research will assess the threats and impacts of human activities on seamounts, including comparing data from seamounts in different stages of fisheries exploitation to understand more about the impacts of fishing activities., both on target species and non-target species, and their habitats.

Current understanding of seamount ecosystems remains limited regarding how their ecosystem functions and biodiversity relate to surrounding marine areas. Studying these dynamics is essential to clarify the ecological connectivity between seamounts and adjacent environments. Future research focus areas such as HERMIONE research include determining whether these underwater features serve as centres of speciation or function as ecological "stepping stones" that facilitate faunal colonisation and dispersal across ocean basins.

=== Chemosynthetic ecosystems ===
Chemosynthetic environments - such as hot vents, cold seeps, mud volcanoes and sulphidic brine pools - show the highest biomass and productivity of all deep-sea ecosystems. The chemicals found in the fluids, gases and mud that escape from such systems provide an energy source for chemosynthetic bacteria and archaea, which are the primary producers in these systems. A huge variety of fauna profits from the association with chemosynthetic microbes, supporting large communities that can exist independently of sunlight. Some of these environments, such as methane (cold) seeps, can support up to 50,000 times more biomass than communities that rely on photosynthetic production alone. Owing to the extreme gradients and diversity in physical and chemical factors, hydrothermal vents also remain incredibly fascinating ecosystems. HERMIONE researchers aim to illustrate the tight coupling between geosphere and biosphere processes, as well as their immense heterogeneity and interconnectivity, by observing and comparing the spatial and temporal variation of chemosynthetic environments in European Sea’s.

Methane cycling and carbonate formation by microorganisms in chemosynthetic environments have implications for the control of greenhouse gases. Methane can be trapped and stored under the seabed as a gas hydrate, and under different conditions, can either be controlled by microbial consumption, or can escape into the surrounding seawater, and ultimately the atmosphere. Our understanding of the biological controls of methane seepage and feedback mechanisms for global warming is limited. The distribution and structure of cold seep communities can act as an indicator for changes in methane fluxes in the deep sea, e.g. by seafloor warming. Using multibeam echosounder data and 3D seismic data with in situ studies at seep sites, and by investigating the life histories of fauna at such ecosystems, HERMIONE scientists aim to understand more about their interconnectivity and resilience, and the implications for climate change.

The great variety of fauna present in chemosynthetic environments is a real challenge to scientists. Only a tiny fraction of microorganisms at vents and seeps has been identified, and a huge amount is still to be discovered. Their identification, their association with fauna, and the relationship between their diversity, function and habitat, are vital areas of research as biological communities act as important filters, controlling up to 100% of vent and seep emissions. By using DNA barcoding and genome analysis in addition to traditional methods of identification and experimentation, HERMIONE scientists will study the relationship between community structure and ecosystem functioning at a variety of vents, seeps, brine pools and mud volcanoes.

== Socio-economics, governance and science-policy interfaces ==
With increasing ocean exploration over the last two decades has come the realisation that humans have had an extensive impact on the world’s oceans, not just close to our shores, but also reaching down into the deep sea. From destructive fishing practices and exploitation of mineral resources to pollution and litter, evidence of human impact can be found in virtually all deep-sea ecosystems. In response, the international community has set a series of ambitious goals aimed at protecting the marine environment and its resources for future generations. Three of these initiatives, decided on by world leaders during the 2002 World Summit on Sustainable Development (Johannesburg), are to achieve a significant reduction in biodiversity loss by 2010, to introduce an ecosystems approach to marine resource assessment and management by 2010, and to designate a network of marine protected areas by 2012. A crucial requirement for implementing these is the availability of high-quality scientific data and knowledge, as well as effective science-policy interfaces to ensure the policy relevance of research and to enable the rapid translation of scientific information into science policy.

HERMIONE aims to provide this by filling the knowledge gap about threatened deep-sea ecosystems and their current status with respect to anthropogenic impacts (e.g. litter, chemical contamination). Socio-economists and natural scientists work together in HERMIONE, researching the socio-economics of anthropogenic impacts, mapping human activities that affect the deep sea, assessing the potential for valuing deep-sea ecosystem goods and services, studying governance options and designing and implementing real-time science-policy interfaces.

HERMIONE natural and social science results will provide national, regional (EU), and global policy-makers and other stakeholders with the information needed to establish policies to ensure the sustainable use of the deep ocean and conservation of deep-sea ecosystems.
