= Ermes =

Ermes may refer to:

- ERMES, the European radio paging system
- Ermes (name), including a list of people with the name
- Ermes di Colorêt (1622–1692), Italian count and writer
- Ermes, a brand name used in 2003 as the successor to Woolworth department stores in Cyprus

== See also ==
- Ērģeme, a village in Latvia
- Ernes, a commune in Normandy, France
