= Hermus (surname) =

Hermus is a surname. Notable people with the surname include:

- Antony Hermus (born 1973), Dutch conductor
- Milou Hermus (1947–2021), Dutch artist
- Randee Hermus (born 1979), Canadian soccer player
