= Villa Terrace Museum and Gardens =

Historic house in Wisconsin, United States

- Lloyd R. Smith House
- U.S. National Register of Historic Places
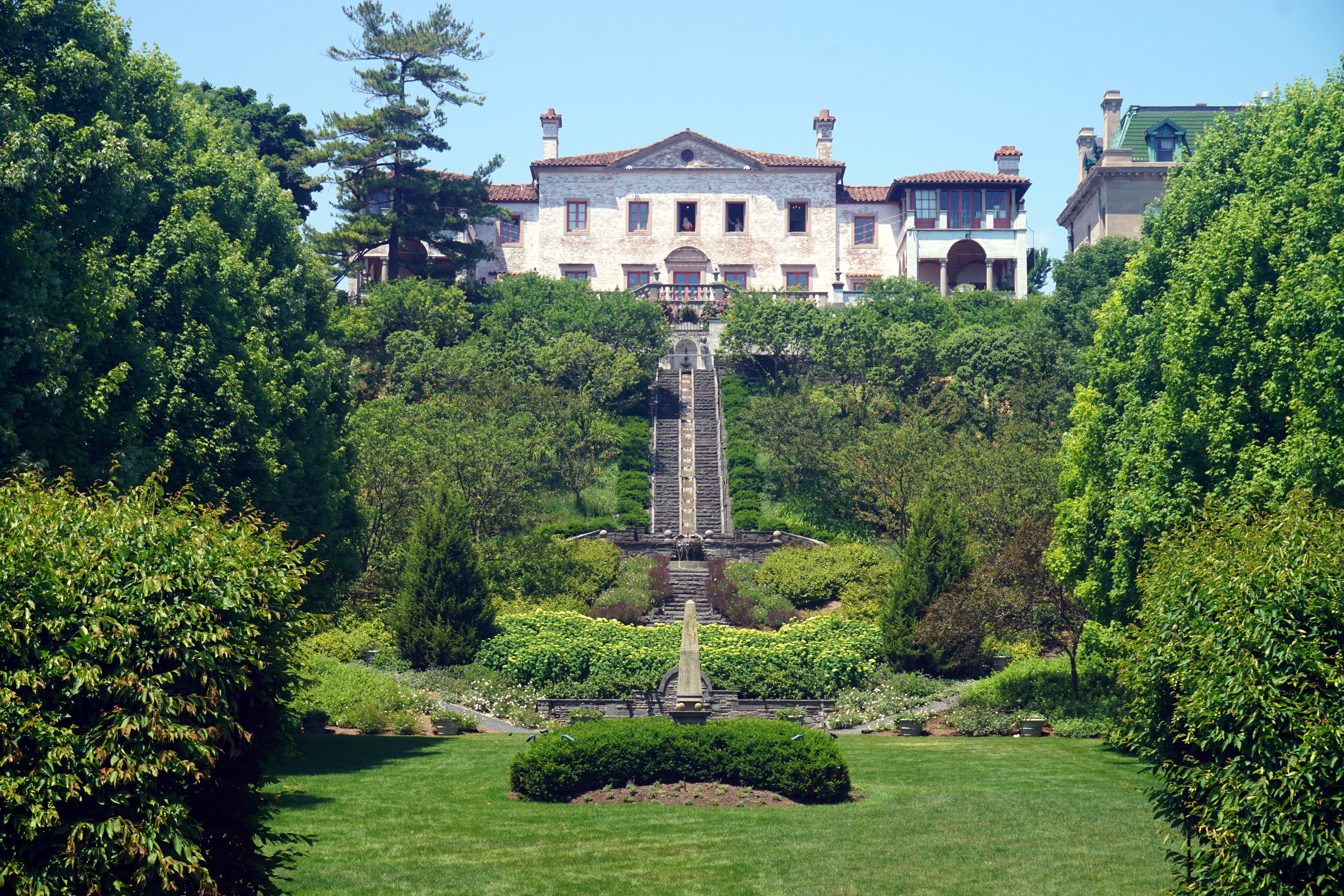
- Location: 2220 N. Terrace Ave., Milwaukee, Wisconsin
- Coordinates: 43°3′27.6″N 87°52′50.54″W
- Built: 1923
- Architect: David Adler, Rose Standish Nichols
- Architectural style: Renaissance
- NRHP reference No.: 74000107
- Added to NRHP: December 30, 1974

Villa Terrace is a historic house in Milwaukee, Wisconsin. It was built in 1924 for the Lloyd R. Smith family - an Italian Renaissance-style home on a bluff above Lake Michigan. Since 1966 the house and grounds have housed the Villa Terrace Museum. It is listed on the National Register of Historic Places as Lloyd R. Smith House. Villa Terrace is a popular site for weddings and receptions in Milwaukee.

== History ==
Lloyd Smith (1883–1944) was the president of A.O. Smith Corporation. He married Agnes Gram in 1915. After returning from a trip to Italy, Lloyd and Agnes commissioned architect David Adler to design their new home. The architecture and water stairs were inspired by Villa Cicogna Mozzoni (built in the 1560s) in Lombardy, Italy. Smith called the house Sopra Mare, which is Italian for "above the sea." The general form is a rectangle surrounding an open central courtyard. Walls are of red brick that has been painted white. The roof is covered with barrel tile. Inside, the original rooms included a dining room with a beamed ceiling of pecky cypress wood, a living room with 2 fireplaces and pegged walnut floor, and a library. The ironwork in the home is from the Milwaukee studio of Cyril Colnik, an Austrian-born blacksmith. The parti of the house is extremely similar to Crane Cottage at the Jekyll Island Club, also designed by Adler.

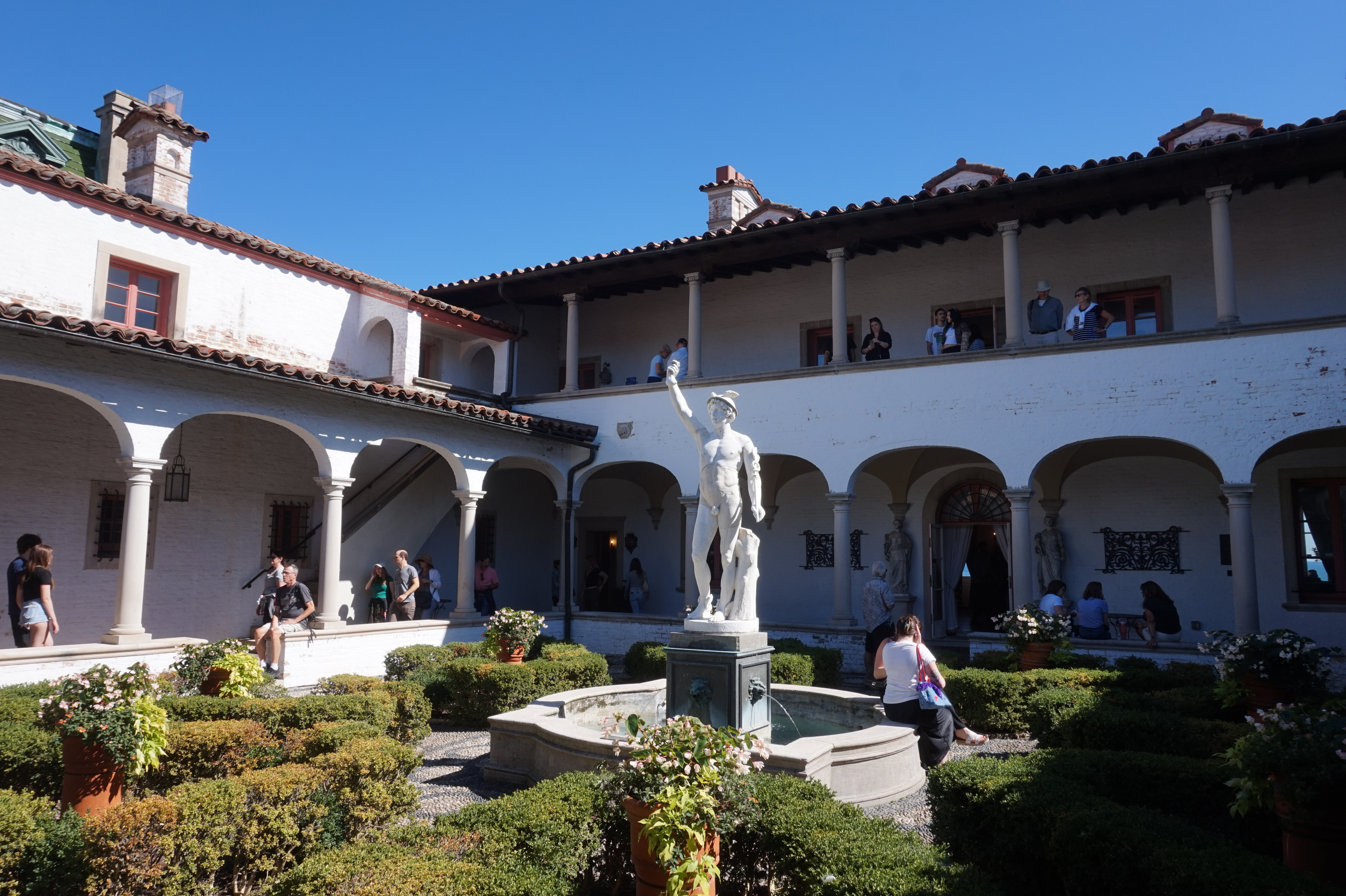
Courtyard of Villa Terrace

The surrounding bluff is landscaped with terraces and formal gardens, a "water stairway," fishponds, and two secret gardens. Rose Standish Nichols is credited with the original landscape design.

Lloyd Smith died in 1944. In 1966 Agnes donated their home to Milwaukee County to serve as a Decorative Arts Museum. Some rooms were converted to offices, but the house and grounds changed little with the transition from home to museum. In 1976, a formal planting of sugar maple bosques with privet hedges and white gravel was installed.

Villa Terrace's art collection features fine and decorative arts dating from the 15th through the 19th centuries, wrought iron masterpieces by Cyril Colnik and changing exhibitions. It is also the host of a Garden Lecture series, in which attendees are able to learn more about planning and maintenance for their home gardens.

== Renaissance Garden ==
In 1997, the Friends of Villa Terrace committed themselves to restore the gardens at Villa Terrace. Based on the master plan created by Dennis Buettner of Buettner & Associates, volunteers with the Renaissance Garden Club began two years of site clearing in the spring of 1998. Construction of the gardens began in 2000 and continued for two more years. After four years of work, the gardens officially opened to the public in September 2002. Since that time, the gardens have been continuously maintained by the Friends of Villa Terrace.

== See also ==
- Hermes
