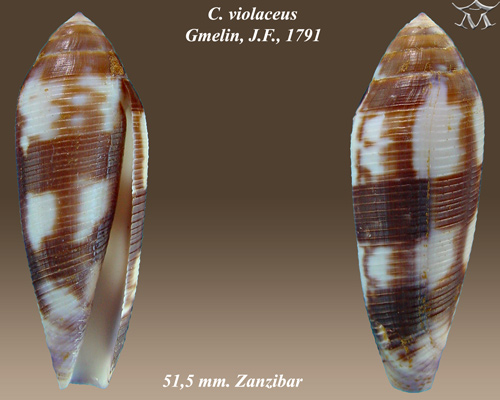
- Apertural and abapertural views of shell of Conus violaceus Gmelin, J.F., 1791
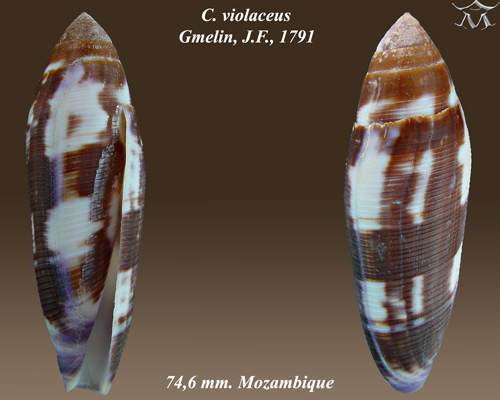

Scientific classification
- Kingdom: Animalia
- Phylum: Mollusca
- Class: Gastropoda
- Subclass: Caenogastropoda
- Order: Neogastropoda
- Superfamily: Conoidea
- Family: Conidae
- Genus: Conus
- Species: C. violaceus

Binomial name
- Conus violaceus Gmelin, 1791

Synonyms
- Conus (Virgiconus) violaceus Gmelin, 1791 · accepted, alternate representation; Conus tendineus Hwass in Bruguière, 1792; Hermes violaceus (Gmelin, 1791); Pseudohermes violaceus (Gmelin, 1791)

= Conus violaceus =

Species of sea snail

Conus violaceus, common name the tendineus cone, is a species of sea snail, a marine gastropod mollusk in the family Conidae, the cone snails and their allies.

Like all species within the genus Conus, these snails are predatory and venomous. They are capable of stinging humans, therefore live ones should be handled carefully or not at all.

The homonym Conus violaceus Link, H.F. 1807 is a synonym of Conus glans Bruguière, M. 1792.

== Description ==
The size of the medium-sized to large shell varies between 39 mm and 93 mm. The shell is moderately solid and glossy. The light-brown spire has a medium height with a rounded and sharp apex. Its sutures are narrowly channeled. The shoulder is indistinct. The body whorl has a narrow conoid-cylindrical shape. The white aperture is narrow, widening anteriorly. The thick outer lip is straight, sloping somewhat below the shoulder. The ground color of the shell is white, crossed with light brown axial streaks and three chestnut spiral bands. The base of the shell is tinged with violet.

== Distribution ==
This species occurs in the Indian Ocean off East Africa, Mauritius, Chagos and the Mascarene Islands. It is very rare off the Tamil Nadu Coast of India.
