= Hermes (sculpture) =

Public artwork in Milwaukee, Wisconsin

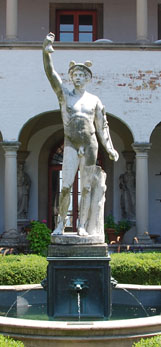
- Artist: Unknown
- Location: Villa Terrace Decorative Arts Museum, Milwaukee
- 43.057565°N 87.880854°W
- Owner: The Garden Club

Hermes is a public artwork located at the Villa Terrace Decorative Arts Museum at 2200 North Terrace Avenue in Milwaukee, Wisconsin.

== Description ==
The antique Roman sculpture is 8-foot high and made of marble. While the torso dates from the first century, the balance of the statue is reputed to be the work of Gian Lorenzo Bernini, a 17th-century Italian sculptor. It depicts the Greek messenger god Hermes. Hermes stands in the courtyard of the Villa Terrace Decorative Arts Museum. In Greek mythology, Hermes is the son of Zeus and one of the twelve principal gods of Olympus. Greek mythology remembers him as graceful and athletic. His standard attributes are winged sandals and a hat. Hermes is also commonly seen with a magic wand (caduceus) that is a symbol of the medical profession because of its ability to reconcile conflicts. The statue depicts Hermes holding a traditional welcoming gift of silver coins in his right hand and a snake entwined, winged staff in his left.

== Historical information ==
Hermes was purchased from Italy in 1902 by Mary Clark Thompson from the Giustiniani collection. The statue was then on loan to Williams College in Williamstown, Massachusetts from the 1920s until its sale in the 1960s. The Milwaukee Art Center Garden Club purchased the statue in 1967 for $10,000 and commissioned a local sculptor, Dick Wilken, to create the decorative bronze pedestal for Hermes. The pedestal is designed with four lion heads and water jets with a pool surrounding the statue.

=== Acquisition ===
The Villa Terrace Decorative Arts Museum was originally named Sopra Mare, the Italian Renaissance villa style home was built in 1922 for the family of Lloyd Raymond Smith by Chicago architect David Adler. This home was private until 1966 when Milwaukee County received the villa as a gift of Mrs. John Jacob Curtis, Lloyd Smith's surviving spouse. The following year the facility opened the building to the public as a Decorative Arts Museum. In order to enhance the museum The Garden Club renovated the courtyard.
