= Milou Hermus =

Dutch painter (1947–2021)

- Born: 17 April 1947; Dordrecht, Netherlands
- Died: 11 April 2021 (aged 73)
- Occupation: painter

Milou Hermus (17 April 1947 – 11 April 2021) was a Dutch painter.

In the 1970s she became known for her 'daring' erotic illustrations for the glossy magazine Avenue. Hermus also worked for BIJ, the magazine of De Bijenkorf. After the death of her husband Ton Blommerde (1946-2005) she started making a series of life-size portraits of friends who had been models named Les belles Hollandaises (2008), including Moniek Toebosch. From 2012 onwards this series was followed by a number of life-size portraits of eighteen famous Dutch men in their shirts, entitled Hollandse Heren (2015), including Alexander Rinnooy Kan, Wim Crouwel, Wim Pijbes and Adriaan van Dis. The series has been exposed at the Kunsthal Rotterdam.

After this, she began doing double exhibitions starting in 2018 alongside Ton Blommerde, whom was also helping design a catalog of her work for future exhibition. Her plans for after the exhibition series ended were never completed and Hermus died on 11 April 2021, aged 73.
