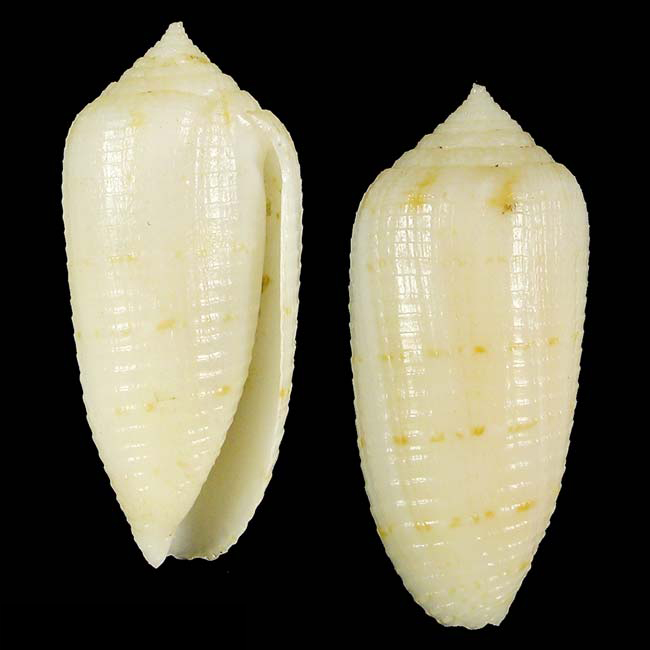
- Seashell Conus terryni

Scientific classification
- Kingdom: Animalia
- Phylum: Mollusca
- Class: Gastropoda
- Subclass: Caenogastropoda
- Order: Neogastropoda
- Superfamily: Conoidea
- Family: Conidae
- Genus: Conus
- Species: C. terryni

Binomial name
- Conus terryni Tenorio & Poppe, 2004

Synonyms
- Conus (Pseudopterygia) terryni Tenorio & Poppe, 2004 · accepted, alternate representation; Conus sagarinoi Fenzan, 2004; Hermes terryni (Tenorio & Poppe, 2004); Pseudopterygia terryni (Tenorio & Poppe, 2004)

= Conus terryni =

Species of sea snail

Conus terryni is an accepted species of sea snail, a marine gastropod mollusk in the family Conidae, the cone snails and their allies. Like all species within the genus Conus, these snails are predatory and venomous. They are capable of stinging humans, therefore live C. terryni should be handled carefully or not at all.

== Description ==
The length of the shell varies between 20 mm and 30 mm. This species is a non-broadcast spawner species and does not even have its trocophore stage of larva life.

== Distribution and habitat ==
This marine species occurs off the Philippines in the Western central pacific ocean often in benthic or tropical waters.
