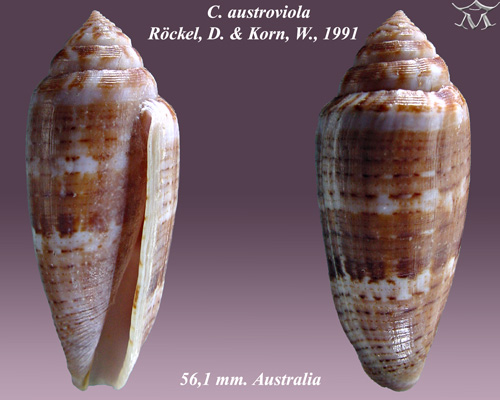
- Apertural and abapertural views of shell of Conus austroviola Röckel, D. & Korn, W., 1991

Conservation status
- Data Deficient (IUCN 3.1)

Scientific classification
- Kingdom: Animalia
- Phylum: Mollusca
- Class: Gastropoda
- Subclass: Caenogastropoda
- Order: Neogastropoda
- Superfamily: Conoidea
- Family: Conidae
- Genus: Conus
- Species: C. austroviola

Binomial name
- Conus austroviola Röckel & Korn, 1992

Synonyms
- Conus (Virgiconus) austroviola Röckel & Korn, 1992 · accepted, alternate representation; Hermes austroviola (Röckel & Korn, 1992); Pseudohermes austroviola (Röckel & Korn, 1992)

= Conus austroviola =

Species of sea snail

Conus austroviola is a species of sea snail, a marine gastropod mollusk in the family Conidae, the cone snails and their allies.

Like all species within the genus Conus, these snails are predatory and venomous. They are capable of stinging humans, therefore live ones should be handled carefully or not at all.

== Description ==
The size of the shell varies between 23 mm and 57 mm.

== Distribution ==
This marine species is endemic to Australia and occurs off the Northern Territory, Queensland, and Western Australia.
