= Hotspot Ecosystems Research on the Margins of European Seas =

International multidisciplinary research project

Hotspot Ecosystems Research on the Margins of European Seas, or HERMES, was an international multidisciplinary project, from April 2005 to March 2009, that studied deep-sea ecosystems along Europe's deep-ocean margin.

The HERMES project was funded by the European Commission's Sixth Framework Programme, and was the predecessor to the HERMIONE project, which started in April 2009.
