= Hermes (given name) =

Hermes is the messenger of the gods in Greek mythology. The masculine given name may also refer to:

- Saint Hermes, several Christian martyrs
- Hermes Trismegistus ("Hermes the thrice-greatest"), the purported author of the Hermetic Corpus, a series of Egyptian-Greek wisdom texts from the 2nd century AD and later
- Hermes L. Ames (1865–1920), New York politician
- Hermes Binner (1943–2020), Argentine physician and politician
- Hermes da Fonseca (1855–1923), Brazilian soldier and politician, 8th President of Brazil and Minister of War
- Hermes Lima (1902–1978), former Prime Minister of Brazil and jurist
- Hermes Gamonal (born 1977), Chilean former tennis player
- Hermes Neves Soares (born 1974), Brazilian footballer nicknamed Hermes
- Hermes Pan (1910–1990), American dancer and choreographer
- Hermes Phettberg (1952–2024), Austrian artist, comedian, and actor
- Hermes Ramírez (born 1948), Cuban retired sprinter
