= Ermes (name) =

Ermes is a personal name. Notable people with this name include:

- Ali Omar Ermes, artist, writer and community activist
- Ermes di Colorêt (1622–1692), Italian count and writer
- Ermes Bentivoglio (1475–1513), Italian condottiero
- Ernest Borgnine, (1917–2012), American actor
- Ermes Borsetti (1913–2005), Italian footballer
- Ermes Costello, fictional character
- Ermes Muccinelli (1927–1994), Italian footballer
- Ermes Paterlini (born 1947), Italian footballer
