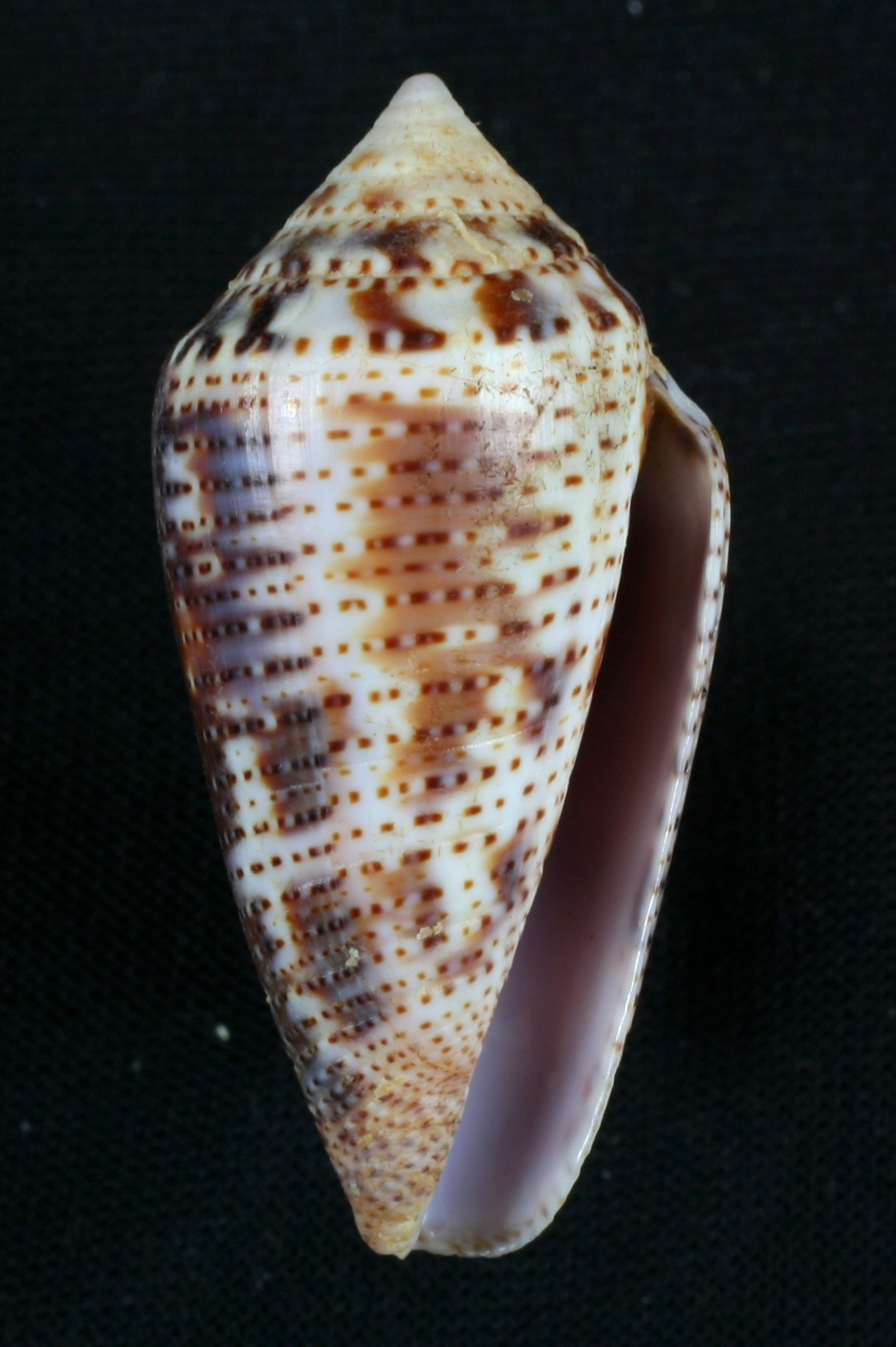
- Apertural view of shell of Conasprella ximenes (Gray, 1839)

Conservation status
- Least Concern (IUCN 3.1)

Scientific classification
- Kingdom: Animalia
- Phylum: Mollusca
- Class: Gastropoda
- Subclass: Caenogastropoda
- Order: Neogastropoda
- Superfamily: Conoidea
- Family: Conidae
- Genus: Conasprella
- Species: C. ximenes

Binomial name
- Conasprella ximenes (Gray, 1839)

Synonyms
- Conasprella (Ximeniconus) ximenes (Gray, 1839) · accepted, alternate representation; Conus interruptus Broderip & G. B. Sowerby I, 1829 (invalid: junior homonym of Conus interruptus W. Wood, 1828); Conus ximenes Gray, 1839 (original combination); Hermes triggi Cotton, 1945; Ximeniconus ximenes (Gray, 1839)

= Conasprella ximenes =

Species of gastropod

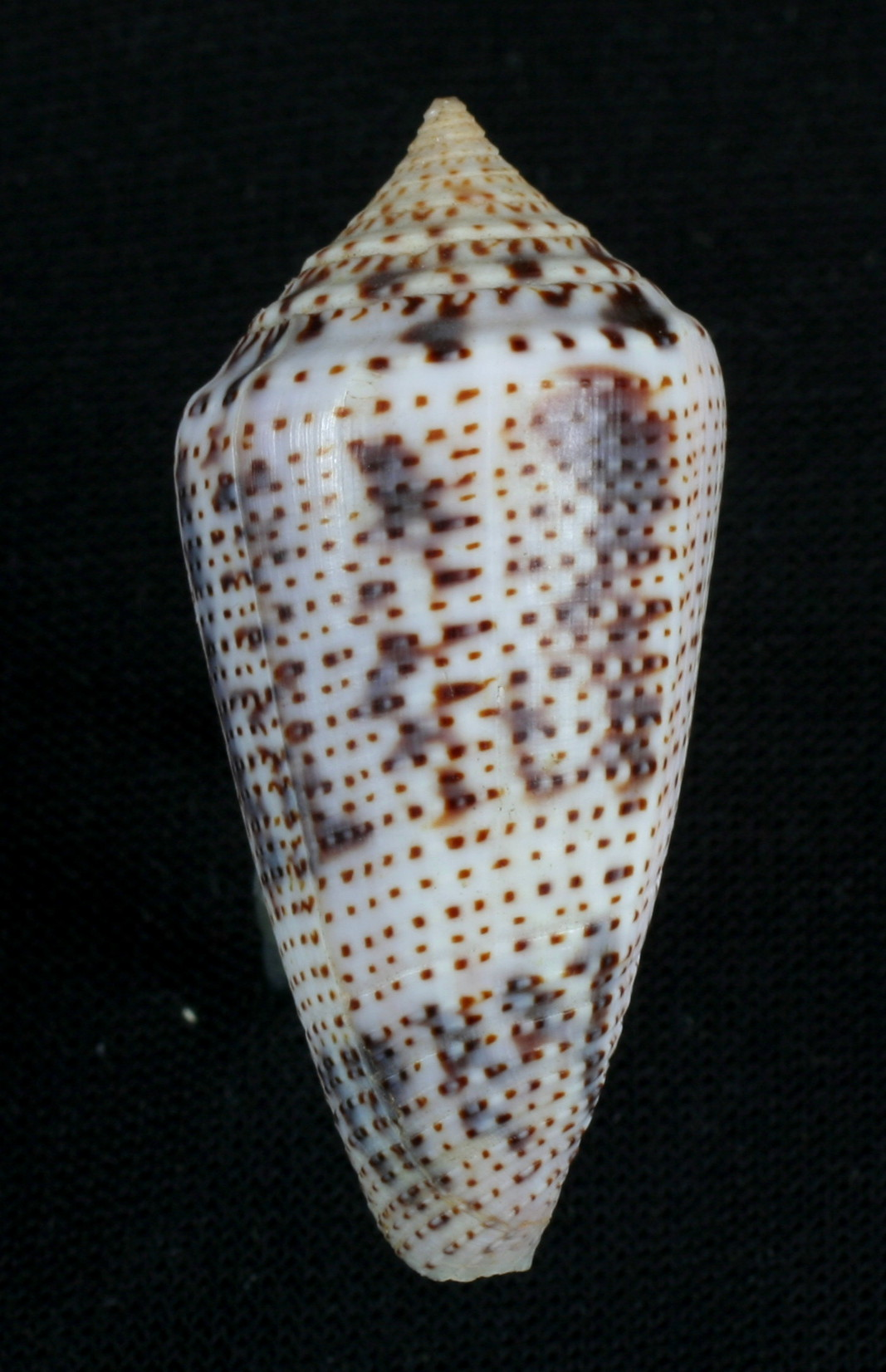
Abapertural view of shell of Conasprella ximenes (Gray, 1839)

Conasprella ximenes is a species of sea snail, a marine gastropod mollusk in the family Conidae, the cone snails and their allies.

Like all species within the genus Conasprella, these cone snails are predatory and venomous. They are capable of stinging humans, therefore live ones should be handled carefully or not at all.

== Description ==
The size of the shell varies between 20 mm and 40 mm though larger ones may exist. Conasprella ximenes have a robust, conical shell with a pointed apex and a venomous harpoon. The shell is smooth and glossy, with a variety of colors and patterns. The opening of the shell, is narrow and elongated, leading to a pointed siphonal canal.

It is a carnivorous predator that uses its harpoon to hunt and subdue its prey. The venom is delivered through the harpoon and paralyzes the prey, allowing the snail to consume it whole. The diet mainly consists of worms, small fish, and other mollusks.

== Distribution ==
This marine species occurs from the Gulf of California, Western Mexico to Peru; and off the Galápagos Islands.It can be found in coral reefs, rocky shores, and sandy bottom in depths between 10 and 50 meters, in the neritic zone (shoreline to the edge of the continental shelf).

== Gallery ==
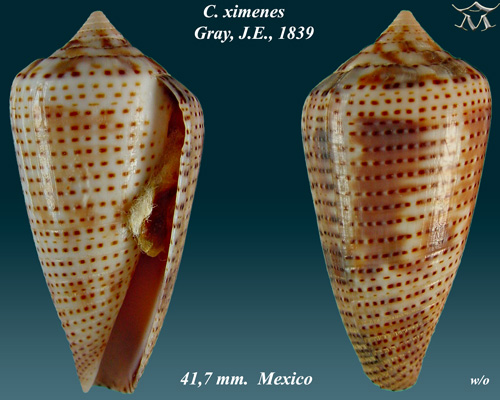
Conasprella ximenes (Gray, J.E., 1839)

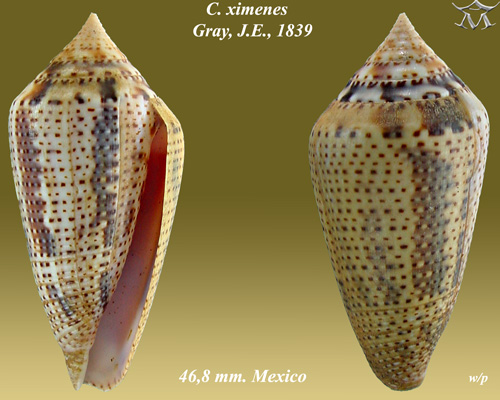
Conasprella ximenes (Gray, J.E., 1839)

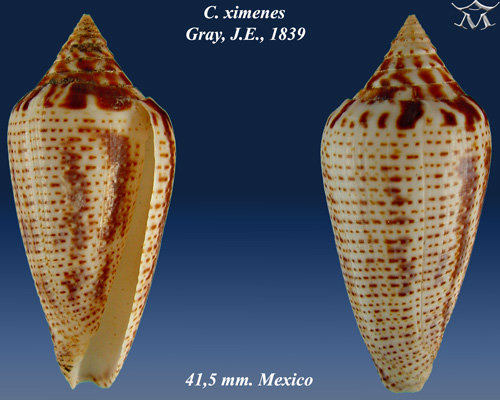
Conasprella ximenes (Gray, J.E., 1839)
