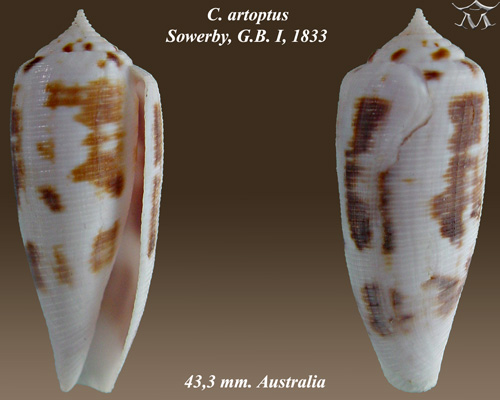
- Apertural and abapertural views of shell of Conus artoptus Sowerby, G.B. I, 1833
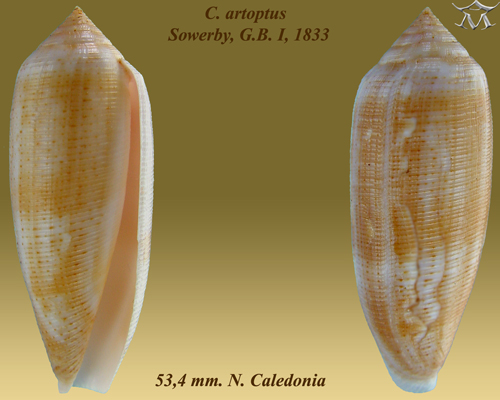

Conservation status
- Least Concern (IUCN 3.1)

Scientific classification
- Kingdom: Animalia
- Phylum: Mollusca
- Class: Gastropoda
- Subclass: Caenogastropoda
- Order: Neogastropoda
- Superfamily: Conoidea
- Family: Conidae
- Genus: Conus
- Species: C. artoptus

Binomial name
- Conus artoptus G. B. Sowerby I, 1833

Synonyms
- Conus spectabilis A. Adams, 1855; Conus (Virgiconus) artoptus G. B. Sowerby I, 1833· accepted, alternate representation; Hermes artoptus (G. B. Sowerby I, 1833); Pseudohermes artoptus (G. B. Sowerby I, 1833)

= Conus artoptus =

Species of sea snail

Conus artoptus, common name the tender cone, is a species of sea snail, a marine gastropod mollusk in the family Conidae, the cone snails and their allies.

Like all species within the genus Conus, these snails are predatory and venomous. They are capable of stinging humans, therefore live ones should be handled carefully.

== Description ==
The size of the shell varies between 35 mm and 79 mm. The shell is narrow, cylindrical, and encircled by minutely granose striae. Its color is whitish, broadly three-banded by oblong longitudinal clouds of orange-brown, the interstices brown-spotted.

== Distribution ==
This marine species occurs off the Philippines, Indo-Malaysia, the Solomon Islands, in the Sulu Sea, off Vanuatu and Australia (Northern Territory, Queensland, Western Australia)
