= Hermes protocol =

The Hermes Standard is a machine-to-machine communication standard used in the SMT assembly industry.

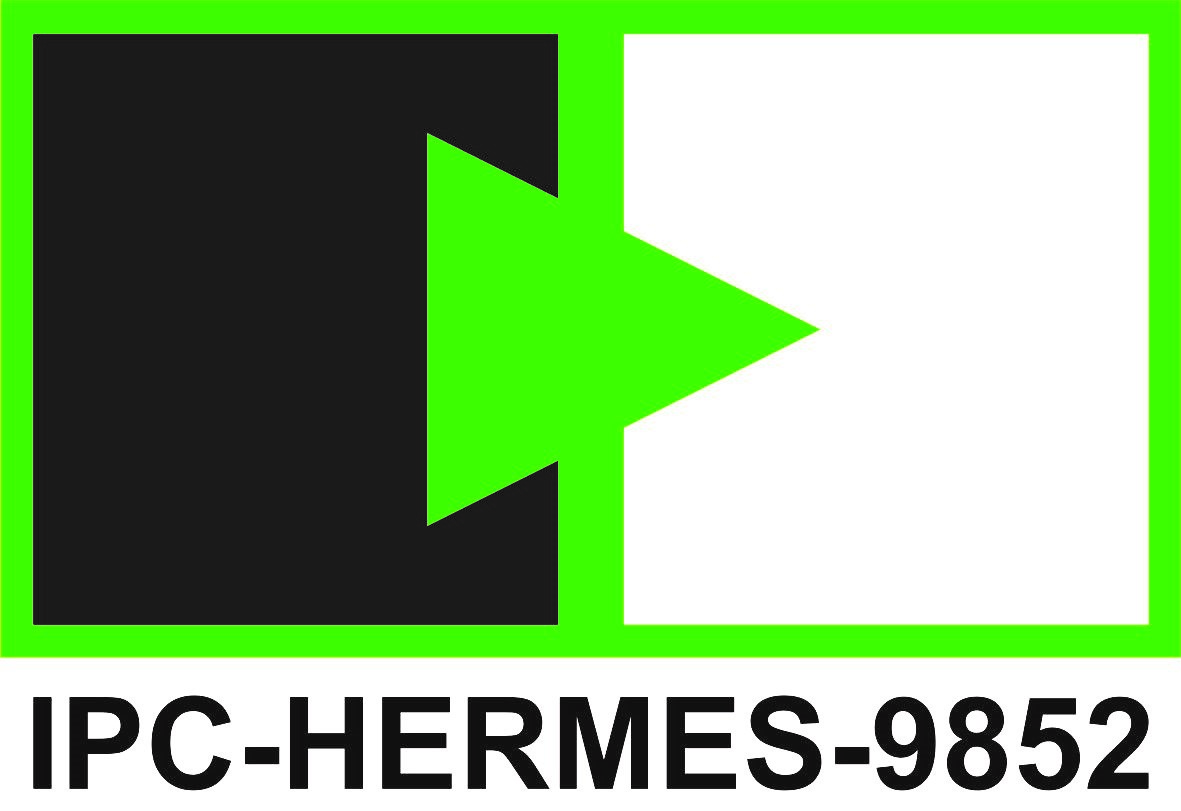
IPC-HERMES-9852

It is a successor to the SMEMA standard, introducing improvements such as: simpler physical wiring (Ethernet), use of popular data transmission formats (TCP/IP and XML), reduced number of barcode scanners (required only once at the beginning of the line), transmission of board data (such as barcodes & dimensions) to downstream machines.

By the end of 2018 IPC has confirmed to recognize The Hermes Standard to be the successor to “the SMEMA Standard” IPC-SMEMA-9851, which has been the only globally accepted and broadly established standard for machine to machine communication in SMT with regards to PCB handover. Accordingly, The Hermes Standard was assigned an IPC naming code: It can now officially be referred to as IPC-HERMES-9852.

The current version, IPC-HERMES-9852, Version 1.7 provides an electrical SMEMA interface replacement and extends the interface to communicate such things as unique identifiers for handled printed boards, equipment identifiers of the first machine noticing a printed board, barcodes, conveyor speed and specific information about the product type.

== Industry acceptance ==
The initiative was started by two companies: ASM and ASYS; by April 2017, 17 companies had joined. On November 14, 2017, Hermes received a Global SMT&Packaging Award in the category “Software Process Control” at Productronica in Munich, Germany. As of November 2021, 62 companies are members of the initiative.

4IR.UK British Systems	6TL Engineering	Achat Engineering GmbH	allSMT	ASM Assembly Systems GmbH	Asscon
ASYS Automatisierungssysteme GmbH	BESI	Bright Machines	BTU	CKD
CTI Systems	CTS	CYBEROPTICS	Digitaltest	ECD	Essemtec
EUNIL	Eunil Co., Ltd.	Exelsius	Famecs	FlexLink
GKG	GÖPEL electronic GmbH	Hanwha	Heller Industries	Innomelt	IPTE
IBL-Löttechnik GmbH	ITW EAE	JAPAN UNIX Co. Ltd.	JOT Automation Kft.	Keysight Technologies
KIC	KOH YOUNG Technology Inc.	kolb Cleaning Technology GmbH	Kulicke & Soffa	Kurtzersa
Magic Ray Technology	MIRTEC	MYCRONIC	Nordson ASYMTEK & MATRIX	Nutek Europe B.V.
OMRON Corporation	OSAI	PARMI	Pemtron	Rehm Thermal Systems GmbH
Rejoint	RG Elektrotechnologie	SEICA SpA & SEICA Automation	SAKI Corp	Scheid IT
SEHO Systems	SICK AG	SMT-Wertheim	SolderStar	Sonic Technology
SPEA S.p.A.	SYNEO	Test Research, Inc. (TRI)	Takaya	Universal Instruments	VISCOM AG
ViTrox	YJ Link Co., Ltd.	YXLON

== Specification ==
- Munich, April 2017 release of Version 1.0
- Munich, November 2017 release of Version 1.0 Revision 1
- Shanghai, April 2018 release of Version 1.1
- San Diego, January 2019 release of Version 1.2
- Online, March 2021 release of Version 1.3
- Munich and Online, November 2021 release of Version 1.4
- Online, June 2022, release of version 1.5
- Anaheim and Online, April 2024, release of version 1.6
- Shenzhen and Online, November 2024, vote of version 1.7
- Munich and Online, November 2025, revote of version 1.7 with extras

Note: The release schedule of the standard is now determined by the IPC Task Group (open to all) whose meetings occur after the Initiative meetings (open to machine builders).

The specification is freely available for download from the Hermes Standard Initiative website. At the same time, the standard is available in the IPC Online Shop.
