= Hermes (surname) =

Hermès is a surname of Provençal origin. Derived from the Old Provencal erm, meaning "a desert"/"a wasteland" plus the locative suffix -ès, meaning "associated with"/"pertinent to"/"inhabitant of", the topographic surname Hermès indicates that the original bearer lived in relative isolation upon, or was otherwise associated with, an area of barren or uncultivated land.

People with the surname Hermes include:

- Ad Hermes (1929–2002), Dutch (CDA) politician
- Andreas Hermes (1878–1964), German politician, minister in several Weimar Republic governments and member of the anti-Nazi resistance
- Carli Hermès (born 1963), Dutch photographer and commercial director
- Georg Hermes (1775–1831), German Roman Catholic philosopher and theologian
- Gertrude Hermes (1901–1983), English wood engraver, printmaker and sculptor
- Hans Hermes (1912–2003), German mathematician
- Heriberto Hermes (1932–2018), American Roman Catholic bishop
- Johann Gustav Hermes (1846–1912), German mathematician
- Johann Timotheus Hermes (1738 – 1821), German poet, novelist and Protestant theologian.
- Peter Hermes (1922–2015), West German Ambassador to the United States from 1979 to 1984, son of Andreas
- Thierry Hermès (1801-1878), French founder in 1837 of the French luxury design house Hermès
- Will Hermes (born 1960), American author, broadcaster, journalist and critic
