= Operation Hermes =

Operation Hermes may refer to:

- Operation Hermes, a coalition military operation of the Iraq War
- Joint Operation Hermes, an operation of the European Border and Coast Guard Agency
- Operation Hermes, a 1970 planned coup against Makarios, facilitated by Polycarpos Giorkatzis
