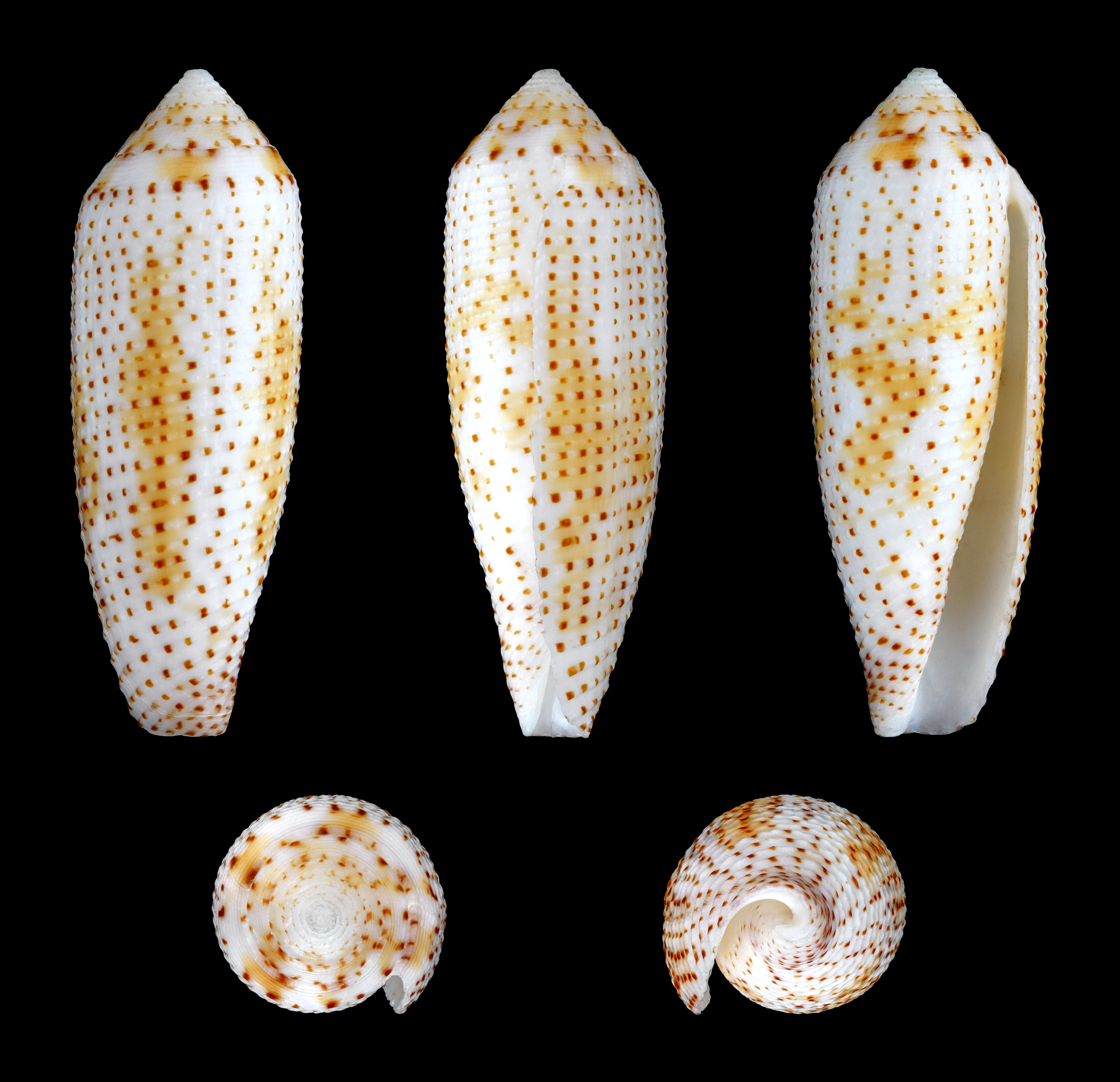
- Five views of a shell of Conus nussatella

Conservation status
- Least Concern (IUCN 3.1)

Scientific classification
- Kingdom: Animalia
- Phylum: Mollusca
- Class: Gastropoda
- Subclass: Caenogastropoda
- Order: Neogastropoda
- Superfamily: Conoidea
- Family: Conidae
- Genus: Conus
- Species: C. nussatella

Binomial name
- Conus nussatella Linnaeus, 1758

Synonyms
- Conus (Hermes) nussatella Linnaeus, 1758 · accepted, alternate representation; Conus kawanishi Shikama, T., 1970; Conus nussatella var. tenuis G. B. Sowerby I, 1834 (invalid: junior homonym of Conus tenuis G. B. Sowerby I, 1833); Gastridium nussatella Salvat, B. & Rives, C. 1975; Hermes kawanishii Shikama, 1970; Hermes nussatellus (Linnaeus, 1758)

= Conus nussatella =

Species of sea snail

Conus nussatella, common name the Nussatella cone, is a species of sea snail, a marine gastropod mollusk in the family Conidae, the cone snails and their allies.

Like all species within the genus Conus, these snails are predatory and venomous. They are capable of stinging humans, therefore live ones should be handled carefully or not at all.

== Description ==
The size of an adult shell varies between 35 mm and 95 mm. The heavy shell is closely striated, the striae minutely granular. The spire is short but acuminate. The color of the shell is yellowish white, clouded irregularly with orange-brown or light purple-brown blotches, with numerous chestnut spots on the striae.

== Distribution ==
This species is found in the sublittoral zone of the Red Sea and the entire tropical Indo-Pacific Region; off Australia (Northern Territory, Queensland and Western Australia).

== Literature ==
- Linnaeus, C. (1758). Systema Naturae per regna tria naturae, secundum classes, ordines, genera, species, cum characteribus, differentiis, synonymis, locis. Editio decima, reformata. Laurentius Salvius: Holmiae. ii, 824 pp
- Sowerby, G.B. (1st) 1834. Conus. pls 54–57 in Sowerby, G.B. (2nd) (ed). The Conchological Illustrations or coloured figures of all the hitherto unfigured recent shells. London : G.B. Sowerby (2nd).
- Dufo, M.H. 1840. Observations sur les Mollusques marins, terrestres et fluviatiles des iles Séchelles et des Amirantes. Annales des Sciences Naturelles, Paris 2 14, Zoologie: 45–80 (extrait), 166–221(suite)
- Satyamurti, S.T. 1952. Mollusca of Krusadai Is. I. Amphineura and Gastropoda. Bulletin of the Madras Government Museum, Natural History ns 1(no. 2, pt 6): 267 pp., 34 pls
- Gillett, K. & McNeill, F. 1959. The Great Barrier Reef and Adjacent Isles: a comprehensive survey for visitor, naturalist and photographer. Sydney : Coral Press 209 pp.
- Shikama, T. 1970. On some noteworthy marine Gastropoda from southwestern Japan (II). Science Reports of the Yokohama National University 16: 19–27, 1 pl.
- Wilson, B.R. & Gillett, K. 1971. Australian Shells: illustrating and describing 600 species of marine gastropods found in Australian waters. Sydney : Reed Books 168 pp.
- Salvat, B. & Rives, C. 1975. Coquillages de Polynésie. Tahiti : Papéete Les editions du pacifique, pp. 1–391.
- Cernohorsky, W.O. 1978. Tropical Pacific Marine Shells. Sydney : Pacific Publications 352 pp., 68 pls.
- Kay, E.A. 1979. Hawaiian Marine Shells. Reef and shore fauna of Hawaii. Section 4 : Mollusca. Honolulu, Hawaii : Bishop Museum Press Bernice P. Bishop Museum Special Publication Vol. 64(4) 653 pp.
- Wilson, B. 1994. Australian Marine Shells. Prosobranch Gastropods. Kallaroo, WA : Odyssey Publishing Vol. 2 370 pp.
- Röckel, D., Korn, W. & Kohn, A.J. 1995. Manual of the Living Conidae. Volume 1: Indo-Pacific Region. Wiesbaden : Hemmen 517 pp.
- Puillandre N., Duda T.F., Meyer C., Olivera B.M. & Bouchet P. (2015). One, four or 100 genera? A new classification of the cone snails. Journal of Molluscan Studies. 81: 1–23

== Gallery ==
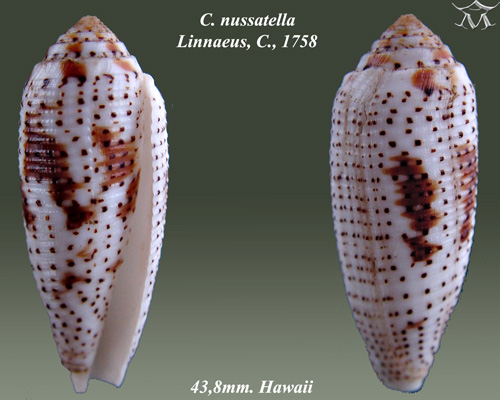
Conus nussatella Linnaeus, C., 1758

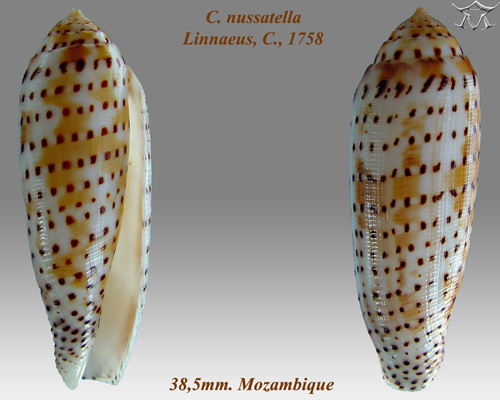
Conus nussatella Linnaeus, C., 1758

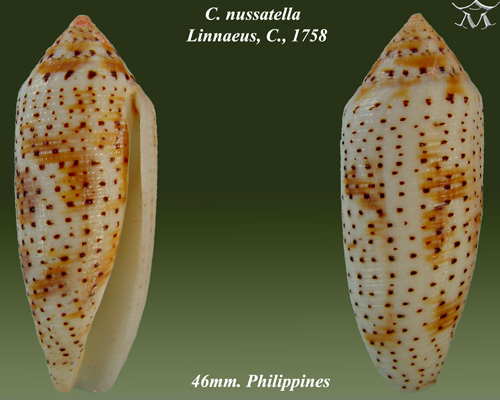
Conus nussatella Linnaeus, C., 1758

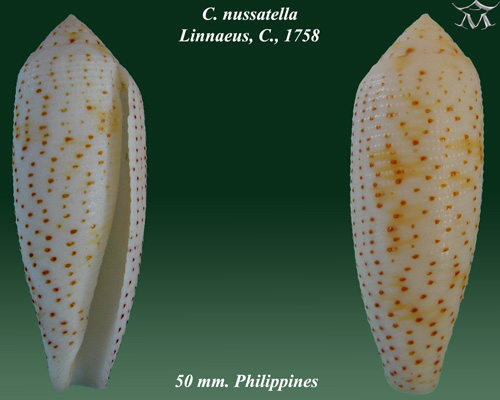
Conus nussatella Linnaeus, C., 1758
