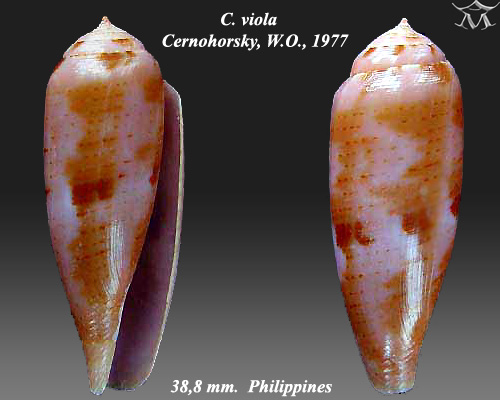
- Apertural and abapertural views of shell of Conus viola Cernohorsky, W.O., 1977
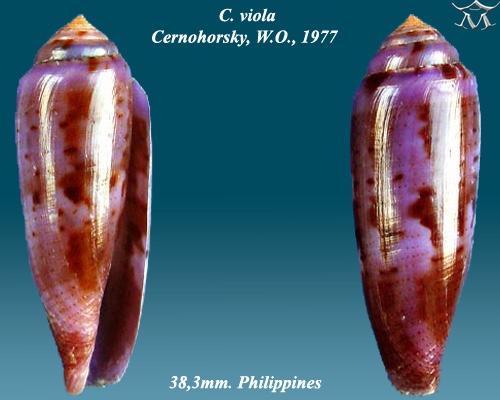

Conservation status
- Least Concern (IUCN 3.1)

Scientific classification
- Kingdom: Animalia
- Phylum: Mollusca
- Class: Gastropoda
- Subclass: Caenogastropoda
- Order: Neogastropoda
- Superfamily: Conoidea
- Family: Conidae
- Genus: Conus
- Species: C. viola

Binomial name
- Conus viola Cernohorsky, 1977

Synonyms
- Conus (Splinoconus) viola Cernohorsky, 1977 · accepted, alternate representation; Conus blatteus Shikama, 1979; Conus violaceus Reeve, 1844 (invalid: junior homonym of Conus violaceus Gmelin, 1791); Hermes viola (Cernohorsky, 1977); Isoconus viola (Cernohorsky, 1977)

= Conus viola =

Species of sea snail

Conus viola, common name the violet cone, is a species of sea snail, a marine gastropod mollusk in the family Conidae, the cone snails and their allies.

Like all species within the genus Conus, these snails are predatory and venomous. They are capable of stinging humans, therefore live ones should be handled carefully or not at all.

== Description ==
The size of the shell varies between 22 mm and 54 mm.

== Distribution ==
This marine species occurs off Okinawa, Japan and between the Philippines and North and Northwestern Australia
