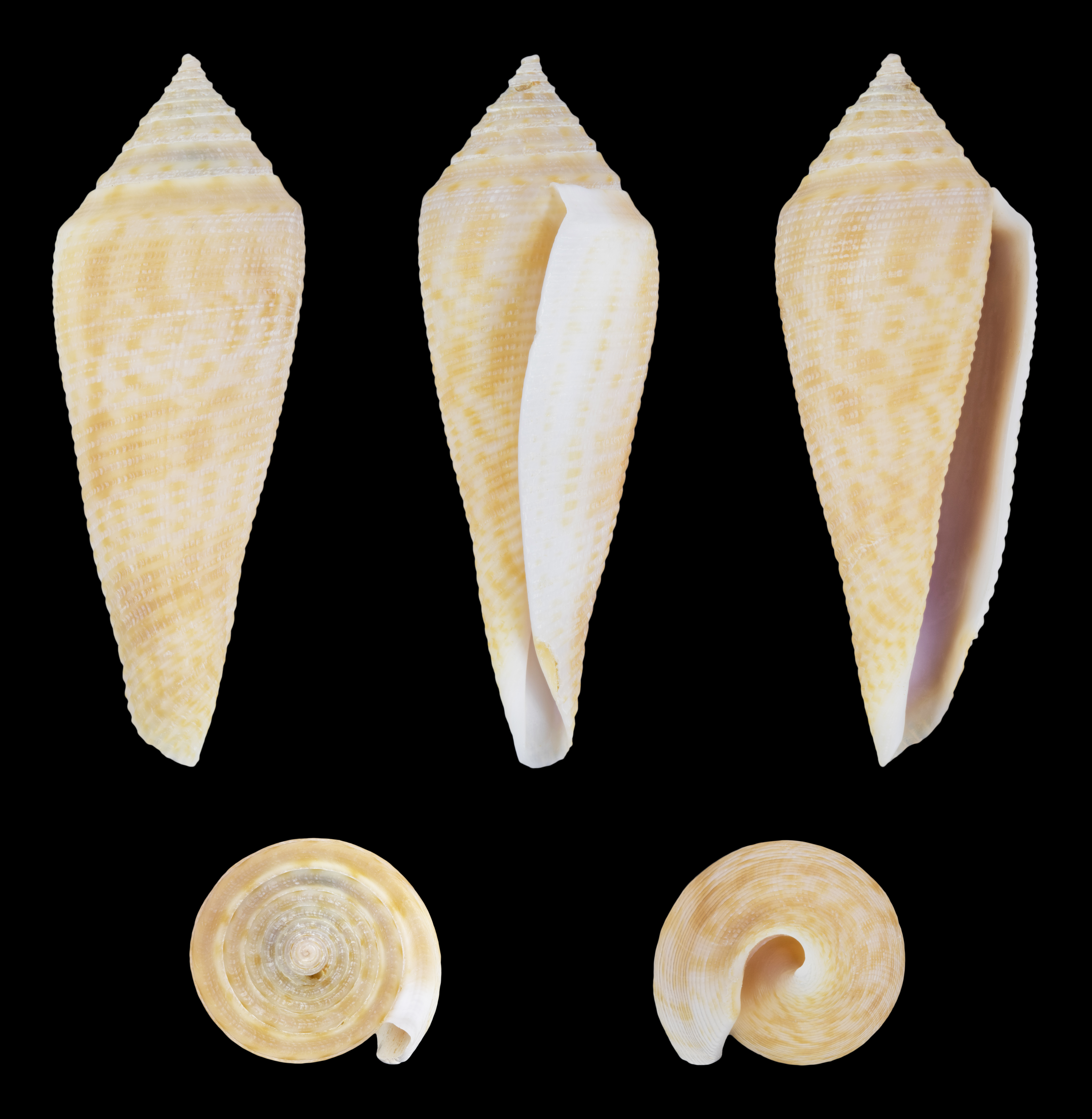
- Five views of a shell of Conasprella viminea (Reeve, L.A., 1849)

Conservation status
- Least Concern (IUCN 3.1)

Scientific classification
- Kingdom: Animalia
- Phylum: Mollusca
- Class: Gastropoda
- Subclass: Caenogastropoda
- Order: Neogastropoda
- Superfamily: Conoidea
- Family: Conidae
- Genus: Conasprella
- Species: C. viminea

Binomial name
- Conasprella viminea (Reeve, 1849)

Synonyms
- Conasprella (Fusiconus) viminea (Reeve, 1849) · accepted, alternate representation; Conus vimineus Reeve, 1849 (original combination); Viminiconus vimineus (Reeve, 1849)

= Conasprella viminea =

Species of gastropod

Conasprella viminea, common name the wickerwork cone, is a species of sea snail, a marine gastropod mollusk in the family Conidae, the cone snails and their allies.

Like all species within the genus Conasprella, these cone snails are predatory and venomous. They are capable of stinging humans; therefore, live ones should be handled carefully or not at all.

== Description ==
The size of the shell varies between 29 mm and 43 mm.

== Distribution ==
This marine species occurs in the southern part of the Red Sea; off the Seychelles; Southern India; Sri Lanka; Western Thailand and off the Philippines.
