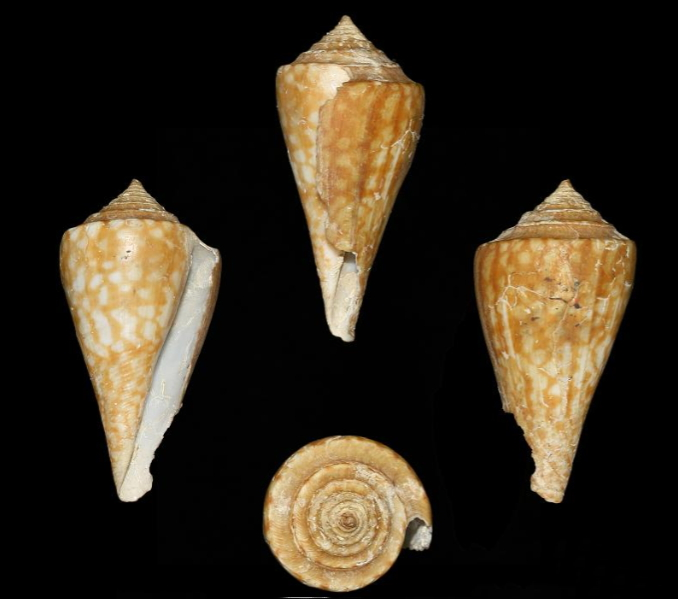
- Shell and protoconch of Conasprella scaripha (holotype at the Smithsonian Institution)

Scientific classification
- Domain: Eukaryota
- Kingdom: Animalia
- Phylum: Mollusca
- Class: Gastropoda
- Subclass: Caenogastropoda
- Order: Neogastropoda
- Superfamily: Conoidea
- Family: Conidae
- Genus: Conasprella
- Species: C. scaripha

Binomial name
- Conasprella scaripha (Dall, 1910)

Synonyms
- Conasprella (Kohniconus) scaripha (Dall, 1910) · accepted, alternate representation; Conus scariphus Dall, 1910 (original combination); Kohniconus scariphus (Dall, 1910)

= Conasprella scaripha =

Species of gastropod

Conasprella scaripha is a species of sea snail, a marine gastropod mollusk in the family Conidae, the cone snails and their allies.

Like all species within the genus Conasprella, these cone snails are predatory and venomous. They are capable of stinging humans, therefore live ones should be handled carefully or not at all.

== Description ==
The height of the shell attains 41 mm, its diameter 15 mm.

(Original description) The biconic shell is attenuated in front, slightly swelling in front of the shoulder, which is sharply carinate. The spire is low and consists of about eight whorls without the (lost) protoconch. The summit of the whorls between the suture and the carina is excavated and smooth. The walls of the shell are rather thin. The outer lip is nearly straight. The ground-color is yellowish white covered with a thin smooth yellowish periostracum. The pattern of fluctuating longitudinal streaks of yellowish brown, which by their zigzag direction and anastomosis leave roughly triangular patches of white of small size all over the shell, except in the middle, where a tendency to the usual paler girdle is manifest. Near the siphonal canal there are about sixteen paired prominent spiral threads, the intervals between the pairs being more or less channeled. The sutural sinus and the siphonal canal are rather deep.

== Distribution ==
This marine species occurs in the Pacific Ocean off the Cocos (Keeling) Islands, Costa Rica at a depth of 121 m.
