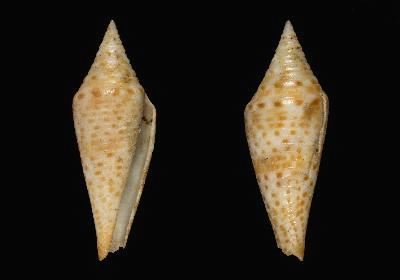
- Shell of Conasprella levenensis (holotype in MNHN, Paris)

Scientific classification
- Kingdom: Animalia
- Phylum: Mollusca
- Class: Gastropoda
- Subclass: Caenogastropoda
- Order: Neogastropoda
- Superfamily: Conoidea
- Family: Conidae
- Genus: Conasprella
- Species: C. levenensis

Binomial name
- Conasprella levenensis (Monnier & Tenorio, 2017)

Synonyms
- Fusiconus levenensis Monnier & Tenorio, 2017 (original combination)

= Conasprella levenensis =

Species of gastropod

Conasprella levenensis is a species of sea snail, a marine gastropod mollusc in the family Conidae, the cone snails, cone shells or cones.

== Distribution ==
This marine species occurs in the Indian Ocean off Madagascar.
