= Conasprella coletteae =

Scientific classification
- Kingdom: Animalia
- Phylum: Mollusca
- Class: Gastropoda
- Subclass: Caenogastropoda
- Order: Neogastropoda
- Superfamily: Conoidea
- Family: Conidae
- Genus: Conasprella
- Species: C. coletteae

Binomial name
- Conasprella coletteae (Petuch, 2013)

Synonyms
- Dalliconus coletteae Petuch, 2013

Species of gastropod

Conasprella coletteae is a species of sea snail, a marine gastropod mollusk in the family Conidae, the cone snails and their allies.
