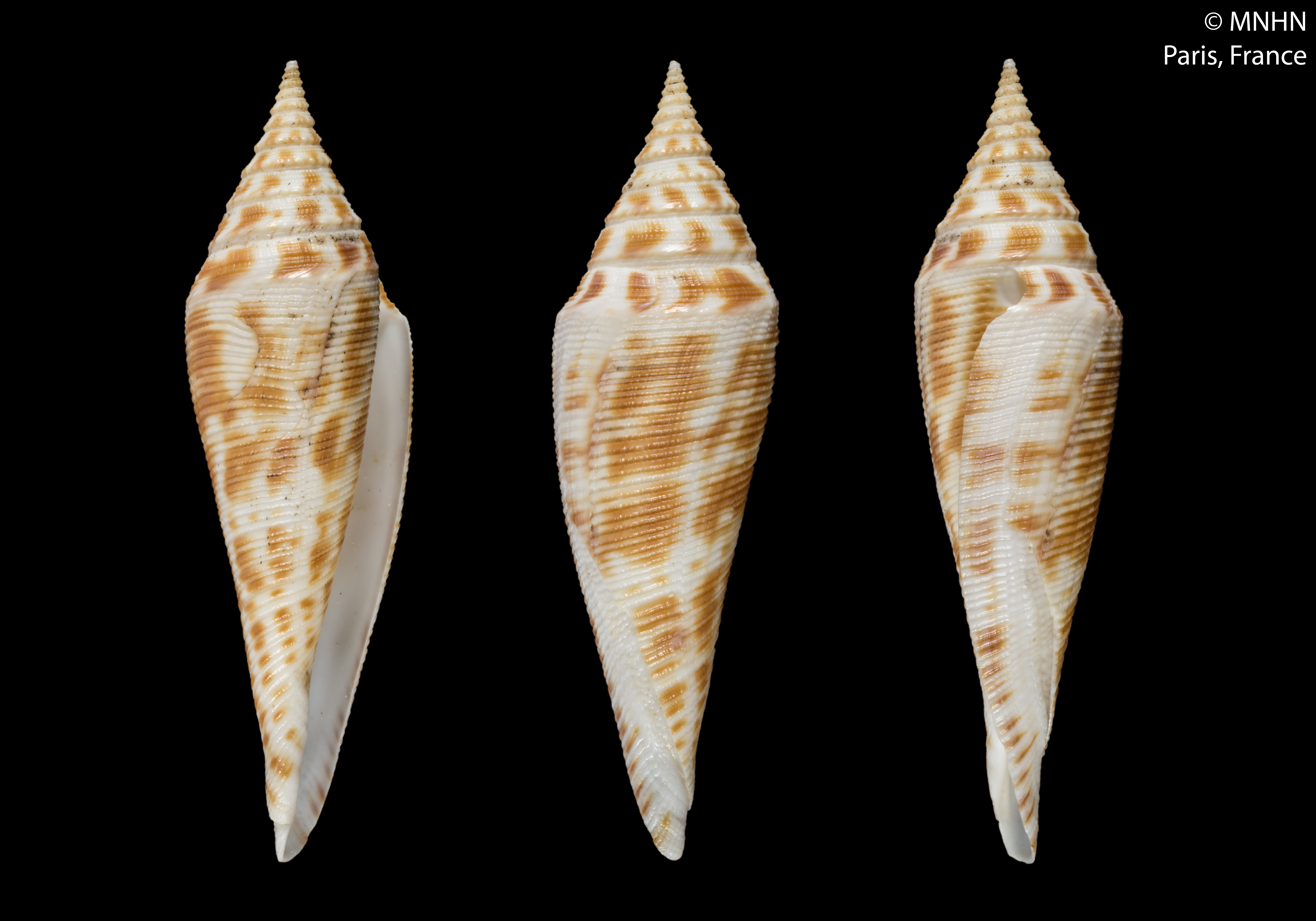
- A shell of Conasprella edpetuchi from Brazil (holotype at MNHN, Paris)

Scientific classification
- Domain: Eukaryota
- Kingdom: Animalia
- Phylum: Mollusca
- Class: Gastropoda
- Subclass: Caenogastropoda
- Order: Neogastropoda
- Superfamily: Conoidea
- Family: Conidae
- Genus: Conasprella
- Species: C. edpetuchi

Binomial name
- Conasprella edpetuchi (Monnier, Limpalaër, Roux & Berschauer, 2015)

Synonyms
- Conasprella (Dalliconus) edpetuchi (Monnier, Limpalaër, Roux & Berschauer, 2015) · accepted, alternate representation; Dalliconus edpetuchi Monnier, Limpalaër, Roux & Berschauer, 2015 (original combination)

= Conasprella edpetuchi =

Species of gastropod

Conasprella edpetuchi also known as Conasprella (Dalliconus) edpetuchi, and originally described as Dalliconus edpetuchi, is a species of predatory sea snail, a marine gastropod mollusc in the family Conidae, the cone snails and their allies.

Like all species within the genus Conasprella, these snails are predatory and venomous. They are capable of stinging humans, therefore live ones should be handled carefully or not at all.

== Description ==
The length of the long, narrow shell varies between 56 and 69 millimetres (2.2 and 2.7 in). Its shape is conical with a striated, turriculate spire with 13 to 15 whorls. The paucispiral protoconch contains about two whorls. The teleoconch contains about 5 to 9 spiral grooves on the sutural ramps and 25 to 30 small beadlike nodules on subsutural ridge ar about two-thirds from the top. The body whorl is smooth with sigmoid sides and a deep anal notch. The long aperture is almost straight with a very straight siphonal lip. The white spire shows brown, regularly scattered blotches. The same blotches are found on the body whorl in irregularly interrupted spiral bands.

== Distribution ==
This species occurs in the Atlantic Ocean, in deep water off central to southern Brazil.
