= Conasprella dieteri =

Scientific classification
- Kingdom: Animalia
- Phylum: Mollusca
- Class: Gastropoda
- Subclass: Caenogastropoda
- Order: Neogastropoda
- Superfamily: Conoidea
- Family: Conidae
- Genus: Conasprella
- Species: C. dieteri

Binomial name
- Conasprella dieteri (Moolenbeek, Zandbergen & Bouchet, 2008)

Synonyms
- Bathyconus dieteri (Moolenbeek, Zandbergen & Bouchet, 2008); Conasprella (Fusiconus) dieteri (Moolenbeek, Zandbergen & Bouchet, 2008) · accepted, alternate representation; Conus dieteri Moolenbeek, Zandbergen & Bouchet, 2008 (original combination)

Species of gastropod

Conasprella dieteri is a species of sea snail, a marine gastropod mollusk in the family Conidae, the cone snails and their allies.

Like all species within the genus Conasprella, these snails are predatory and venomous. They are capable of stinging humans, therefore live ones should be handled carefully or not at all.

== Description ==
The size of the shell attains 17 mm.

== Distribution ==
This marine species occurs off the Marquesas Islands.
