= Conasprella geeraertsi =

Scientific classification
- Kingdom: Animalia
- Phylum: Mollusca
- Class: Gastropoda
- Subclass: Caenogastropoda
- Order: Neogastropoda
- Superfamily: Conoidea
- Family: Conidae
- Genus: Conasprella
- Species: C. geeraertsi

Binomial name
- Conasprella geeraertsi (Poppe & Tagaro, 2017)

Synonyms
- Conasprella eugrammata f. geeraertsi (Poppe & Tagaro, 2017); Conus geeraertsi Poppe & Tagaro, 2017 (original combination)

Species of gastropod

Conasprella geeraertsi is a species of sea snail, a marine gastropod mollusc in the family Conidae, the cone snails, cone shells or cones.

This snail is predatory and venomous and is capable of stinging humans.

== Distribution ==
This marine species of cone snail occurs off the Philippines.
