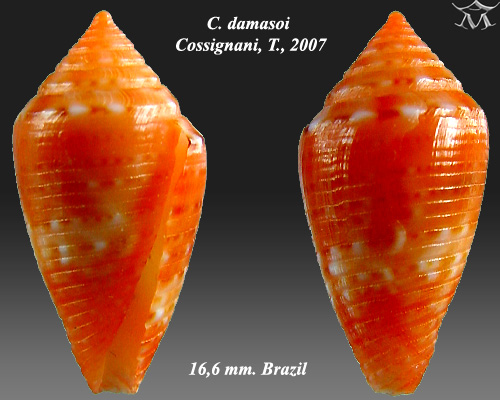
- Apertural and abapertural views of shell of Conasprella damasoi (Cossignani, T., 2007)

Scientific classification
- Kingdom: Animalia
- Phylum: Mollusca
- Class: Gastropoda
- Subclass: Caenogastropoda
- Order: Neogastropoda
- Superfamily: Conoidea
- Family: Conidae
- Genus: Conasprella
- Species: C. damasoi

Binomial name
- Conasprella damasoi (Cossignani, 2007)

Synonyms
- Conasprella (Ximeniconus) damasoi (Cossignani, 2007) · accepted, alternate representation; Conus damasoi Cossignani, 2007 (original combination); Jaspidiconus damasoi (Cossignani, 2007)

= Conasprella damasoi =

Species of gastropod

Conasprella damasoi is a species of sea snail, a marine gastropod mollusc in the family Conidae, the cone snails and their allies.

Like all species within the genus Conasprella, these snails are predatory and venomous. They are capable of stinging humans, therefore live ones should be handled carefully or not at all.

== Description ==
The size of the shell varies between 15 mm and 19 mm.

== Distribution ==
This species occurs in the Atlantic Ocean off Brazil.
