= Conasprella janapatriceae =

Scientific classification
- Kingdom: Animalia
- Phylum: Mollusca
- Class: Gastropoda
- Subclass: Caenogastropoda
- Order: Neogastropoda
- Superfamily: Conoidea
- Family: Conidae
- Genus: Conasprella
- Species: C. janapatriceae

Binomial name
- Conasprella janapatriceae (Petuch, Berschauer & Poremski, 2016)

Synonyms
- Jaspidiconus janapatriceae Petuch, Berschauer & Poremski, 2016 (original combination)

Species of gastropod

Conasprella janapatriceae is a species of sea snail, a marine gastropod mollusc in the family Conidae, the cone snails, cone shells or cones.

== Distribution ==
They occur in the Caribbean Sea, off the Cayman Islands.
