= Conasprella aturensis =

Scientific classification
- Domain: Eukaryota
- Kingdom: Animalia
- Phylum: Mollusca
- Class: Gastropoda
- Subclass: Caenogastropoda
- Order: Neogastropoda
- Superfamily: Conoidea
- Family: Conidae
- Genus: Conasprella
- Species: C. aturensis

Binomial name
- Conasprella aturensis (Peyrot, 1931)

Synonyms
- † Conus (Conospira) subturritus var. aturensis Peyrot, 1931

Species of gastropod

Conasprella aturensis is a species of sea snail, a marine gastropod mollusk in the family Conidae, the cone snails and their allies.

== Distribution ==
This species occurs in the following locations:

France
