= Conasprella traversiana =

Scientific classification
- Kingdom: Animalia
- Phylum: Mollusca
- Class: Gastropoda
- Subclass: Caenogastropoda
- Order: Neogastropoda
- Superfamily: Conoidea
- Family: Conidae
- Genus: Conasprella
- Species: C. traversiana

Binomial name
- Conasprella traversiana (E. A. Smith, 1875)

Synonyms
- Asprella traversiana (E. A. Smith, 1875); Conasprella (Fusiconus) traversiana (E. A. Smith, 1875) · accepted, alternate representation; Conus traversianus E. A. Smith, 1875 (original combination); Fumiconus traversianus (E. A. Smith, 1875)

Species of gastropod

Conasprella traversiana is a species of sea snail, a marine gastropod mollusk in the family Conidae, the cone snails and their allies.

== Description ==
The size of the shell varies between 19 mm and 43 mm.

== Distribution ==
This marine species occurs off Aden and Somalia.
