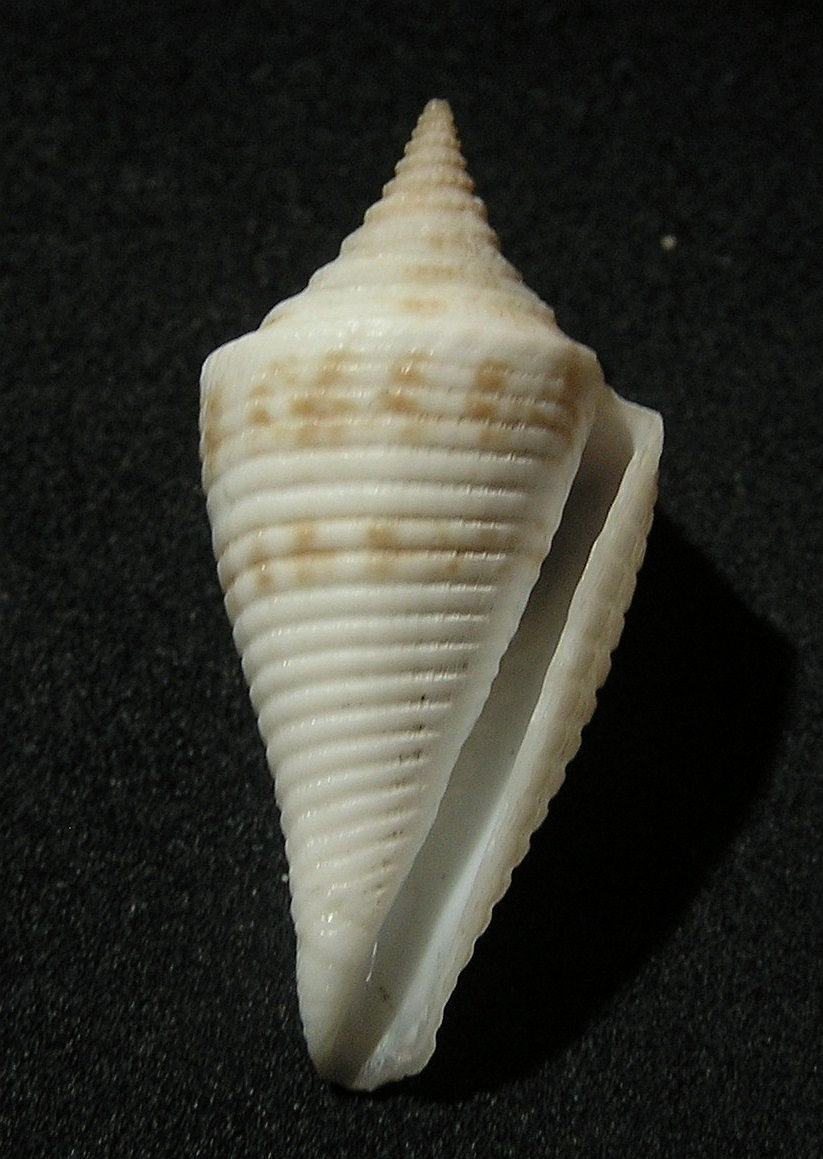
- Apertural view of shell of Conasprella pagoda (Kiener, 1845)

Scientific classification
- Kingdom: Animalia
- Phylum: Mollusca
- Class: Gastropoda
- Subclass: Caenogastropoda
- Order: Neogastropoda
- Superfamily: Conoidea
- Family: Conidae
- Genus: Conasprella; Thiele, 1929

Type species
- Conus pagodus Kiener, 1847 Kiener, 1847

Synonyms
- See list of synonyms

= Conasprella =

Conasprella Temporal range: Eocene–Recent

Genus of gastropods

Conasprella is a genus of sea snails, marine gastropod mollusks in the family Conidae, the cone snails and their allies. This genus was formerly (February 2015) treated by some experts as a member of the family Conilithidae and as an "alternative representation" of this group of species.

== Distinguishing characteristics ==
The Tucker & Tenorio 2009 taxonomy distinguishes Conasprella from Conus in the following ways:

- Genus Conus sensu stricto Linnaeus, 1758

Shell characters (living and fossil species)

The basic shell shape is conical to elongated conical, has a deep anal notch on the shoulder, a smooth periostracum and a small operculum. The shoulder of the shell is usually nodulose and the protoconch is usually multispiral. Markings often include the presence of tents except for black or white color variants, with the absence of spiral lines of minute tents and textile bars.

Radular tooth (not known for fossil species)

The radula has an elongated anterior section with serrations and a large exposed terminating cusp, a non-obvious waist, blade is either small or absent and has a short barb, and lacks a basal spur.

Geographical distribution

These species are found in the Indo-Pacific region.

Feeding habits

These species eat other gastropods including cones.

- Genus Conasprella Thiele, 1929

Shell characters (living and fossil species)

The protoconch is multispiral with 2.5 whorls, the shell is conical in shape, the spire is elevated, the early whorls have nodules at the periphery. The body whorl has evenly spaced cords or sulci that reach the midbody to the shoulder, and the whorls may have cords on top. The anterior notch is absent and the anal notch is deep. The periostracum is smooth, and the operculum is small.

Radular tooth (not known for fossil species)

The blade is short and covers one-third of the anterior section of the radular tooth. The posterior blade is absent, a basal spur is present, and the barb is short. A shaft fold and interior posterior fold is present, however the shaft fold is difficult to detect.

Geographical distribution

These species are found throughout the Indo-Pacific region.

Feeding habits

These species are presumed to be vermivorous (meaning that they prey on marine worms) based upon their radular morphology.

== Species list ==
This list of species is based on the information in the World Register of Marine Species (WoRMS) list. Species within the genus Conasprella include:

According to the 2014 taxonomy, the following species include the following subgenera: Boucheticonus, Coltroconus, Conasprella, Dalliconus, Endemoconus, Fusiconus, Kohniconus, Lilliconus, Parviconus, Pseudoconorbis, and Ximenoconus, as well as Conasprella delessertii (Récluz, 1843), a species "incertae sedes". These subgenera are accepted and are considered alternative representations.

- Conasprella aculeiformis (Reeve, 1844)
- Conasprella agassizi (Dall, 1886)
- Conasprella ageri Hendricks, 2015
- Conasprella alexandremonteiroi (Cossignani, 2014)
- Conasprella alisi (Moolenbeek, Röckel & Richard, 1995)
- Conasprella allamandi (Petuch, 2013)
- Conasprella anacarolinae Cossignani, 2019
- Conasprella anaglyptica (Crosse, 1865)
- Conasprella aphrodite (Petuch, 1979)
- Conasprella aquitanica (Mayer, 1858)
- Conasprella arawak (Petuch & R. F. Myers, 2014)
- Conasprella arcuata (Broderip & G. B. Sowerby I, 1829)
- Conasprella armiger (Crosse, 1858)
- Conasprella articulata (G. B. Sowerby II, 1873)
- Conasprella aturensis (Peyrot, 1931)
- Conasprella baccata (G. B. Sowerby III, 1877)
- Conasprella baileyi (Röckel & da Motta, 1979)
- Conasprella bajanensis (Nowell-Usticke, 1968)
- Conasprella berschaueri (Petuch & R. F. Myers, 2014)
- Conasprella berwerthi (Hoernes & Auinger, 1879)
- Conasprella bianchii (Petuch & Berschauer, 2018)
- Conasprella boholensis (Petuch, 1979)
- Conasprella booti (Petuch, Berschauer & Poremski, 2017)
- Conasprella boriqua (Petuch, Berschauer & Poremski, 2016)
- Conasprella boucheti (Richard, 1983)
- Conasprella bozzettii (Lauer, 1991)
- Conasprella burckhardti (Böse, 1906)
- Conasprella carlagrezziae (Petuch, Coltro & Berschauer, 2020)
- Conasprella carvalhoi (Petuch & Berschauer, 2017)
- Conasprella centurio (Born, 1778)
- Conasprella cercadensis (Maury, 1917)
- Conasprella chaac (Petuch, Berschauer & Poremski, 2017)
- Conasprella chinchorroensis (Petuch, Berschauer & Poremski, 2017)
- Conasprella coletteae (Petuch, 2013)
- Conasprella comatosa (Pilsbry, 1904)
- Conasprella coriolisi (Moolenbeek & Richard, 1995)
- Conasprella coromandelica (E. A. Smith, 1894)
- Conasprella crabosi (Petuch & Berschauer, 2018)
- Conasprella culebrana (Petuch, Berschauer & Poremski, 2016)
- Conasprella damasoi (Cossignani, 2007)
- Conasprella damasomonteiroi (Petuch & Myers, 2014)
- Conasprella delessertii (Récluz, 1843)
- Conasprella dictator (Melvill, 1898)
- Conasprella dieteri (Moolenbeek, Zandbergen & Bouchet, 2008)
- Conasprella edpetuchi (Monnier, Limpalaër, Roux & Berschauer, 2015)
- Conasprella elegans (G. B. Sowerby III, 1895)
- Conasprella elokismenos (Kilburn, 1975)
- Conasprella emarginata (Reeve, 1844)
- Conasprella ericmonnieri (Petuch & R. F. Myers, 2014)
- Conasprella eucoronata (G. B. Sowerby III, 1903)
- Conasprella eugrammata (Bartsch & Rehder, 1943)
- Conasprella fenzani (Petuch & Sargent, 2011)
- Conasprella ferreirai (Petuch & Berschauer, 2017)
- Conasprella fijiensis (Moolenbeek, Röckel & Bouchet, 2008)
- Conasprella fluviamaris (Petuch & Sargent, 2011)
- Conasprella gattegnoi (Poppe & Tagaro, 2017)
- Conasprella geeraertsi (Poppe & Tagaro, 2017)
- Conasprella gordyi (Röckel & Bondarev, 2000)
- Conasprella gregorioi (Crabos & G. S. P. Oliveira, 2021)
- Conasprella grohi (Tenorio & Poppe, 2004)
- Conasprella gubernatrix (Petuch & Berschauer, 2018)
- Conasprella guidopoppei (G. Raybaudi Massilia, 2005)
- Conasprella henckesi (Coltro, 2004)
- Conasprella henriquei (Petuch & R. F. Myers, 2014)
- Conasprella herndli (Petuch & R. F. Myers, 2014)
- Conasprella hivana (Moolenbeek, Zandbergen & Bouchet, 2008)
- Conasprella hopwoodi (Tomlin, 1937)
- Conasprella howelli (Iredale, 1929)
- Conasprella iansa (Petuch, 1979)
- Conasprella icapui (Petuch & Berschauer, 2018)
- Conasprella ichinoseana (Kuroda, 1956)
- Conasprella imitator (A. P. Brown & Pilsbry, 1911)
- Conasprella insculpta (Kiener, 1847)
- Conasprella ione (Fulton, 1938)
- Conasprella itapua (Petuch & Berschauer, 2018)
- Conasprella ixchel (Petuch, Berschauer & Poremski, 2017)
- Conasprella janapatriceae (Petuch, Berschauer & Poremski, 2016)
- Conasprella janowskyae (J. K. Tucker & Tenorio, 2011)
- Conasprella jaspidea (Gmelin, 1791)
- Conasprella joanae (Petuch & Berschauer, 2018)
- Conasprella joliveti (Moolenbeek, Röckel & Bouchet, 2008)
- Conasprella josei (Petuch & Berschauer, 2016)
- Conasprella kantangana (da Motta, 1982)
- Conasprella kellyae (Petuch, Berschauer & Poremski, 2017)
- Conasprella keppensi (Petuch & Berschauer, 2018)
- Conasprella kimioi (Habe, 1965)
- Conasprella kitteredgei (Maury, 1917)
- Conasprella kohni (McLean & Nybakken, 1979)
- Conasprella laudelinoi (Crabos & G. S. P. Oliveira, 2021)
- Conasprella lemuriana Monnier, Tenorio, Bouchet & Puillandre, 2018
- Conasprella lenhilli (Cargile, 1998)
- Conasprella lentiginosa (Reeve, 1844)
- Conasprella levenensis (Monnier & Tenorio, 2017)
- Conasprella lindapowersae (Petuch & Berschauer, 2017)
- Conasprella lizarum (Raybaudi Massilia & da Motta, 1992)
- Conasprella longurionis (Kiener, 1847)
- Conasprella lorenzi Monnier & Limpalaër, 2012
- Conasprella lucida (W. Wood, 1828)
- Conasprella lusca (Petuch, Berschauer & Poremski, 2017)
- Conasprella mahogani (Reeve, 1843)
- Conasprella marcusi (Petuch, Berschauer & Poremski, 2016)
- Conasprella marinae (Petuch & Myers, 2014)
- Conasprella masinoi (Petuch, Berschauer & Poremski, 2016)
- Conasprella mazei (Deshayes, 1874)
- Conasprella mcgintyi (Pilsbry, 1955)
- Conasprella memiae (Habe & Kosuge, 1970)
- Conasprella mindana (Hwass in Bruguière, 1792)
- Conasprella minutissima Harzhauser & Landau, 2016
- Conasprella nereis (Petuch, 1979)
- Conasprella ogum (Petuch & R. F. Myers, 2014)
- Conasprella olangoensis (Poppe & Tagaro, 2017)
- Conasprella orbignyi (Audouin, 1831)
- Conasprella otohimeae (Kuroda & Itô, 1961)
- Conasprella pacei (Petuch, 1987)
- Conasprella pagoda (Kiener, 1847)
- Conasprella paumotu (Rabiller & Richard, 2014)
- Conasprella pepeiu (Moolenbeek, Zandbergen & Bouchet, 2008)
- Conasprella perplexa (G. B. Sowerby II, 1857)
- Conasprella pfluegeri (Petuch, 2003)
- Conasprella philippequiquandoni (Cossignani, 2019)
- Conasprella pomponeti (Petuch & Myers, 2014)
- Conasprella poremskii (Petuch & R. F. Myers, 2014)
- Conasprella prugnaudorum (Petuch & Berschauer, 2018)
- Conasprella pseudokimioi (da Motta & Martin, 1982)
- Conasprella pseudorbignyi (Röckel & Lan, 1981)
- Conasprella puncticulata (Hwass in Bruguière, 1792)
- Conasprella pusio (Hwass in Bruguière, 1792)
- Conasprella rachelae (Petuch, 1988)
- Conasprella rainesae (McGinty, 1953)
- Conasprella ramalhoi (Coomans, Moolenbeek & Wils, 1986)
- Conasprella ramosorum (Petuch & Berschauer, 2019)
- Conasprella raoulensis (Powell, 1958)
- Conasprella roatanensis (Petuch & Sargent, 2011)
- Conasprella roberti (Richard, 2009)
- Conasprella rutila (Menke, 1843)
- Conasprella saecularis (Melvill, 1898)
- Conasprella sargenti (Petuch, 2013)
- Conasprella sauros (Garcia, 2006)
- Conasprella scaripha (Dall, 1910)
- Conasprella schirrmeisteri (Coltro, 2004)
- Conasprella serafimi (Petuch & Berschauer, 2019)
- Conasprella sieboldii (Reeve, 1848)
- Conasprella simonei (Petuch & R. F. Myers, 2014)
- Conasprella somalica (Bozzetti, 2013)
- Conasprella spirofilis (Habe & Kosuge, 1970)
- Conasprella stearnsii (Conrad, 1869)
- Conasprella stenostoma (G. B. Sowerby I, 1850)
- Conasprella stocki (Coomans & Moolenbeek, 1990)
- Conasprella tammymyersae (Petuch & Berschauer, 2019)
- Conasprella subturrita (d'Orbigny, 1852)
- Conasprella tayrona (Petuch, Berschauer & Poremski, 2017)
- Conasprella tiki (Moolenbeek, Zandbergen & Bouchet, 2008)
- Conasprella tirardi (Röckel & Moolenbeek, 1996)
- Conasprella toincabrali (Petuch & Berschauer, 2019)
- Conasprella torensis (Sturany, 1903)
- Conasprella tornata (G. B. Sowerby I, 1833)
- Conasprella traceyi (J. K. Tucker & Stahlschmidt, 2010)
- Conasprella traversiana (E. A. Smith, 1875)
- Conasprella valianti (Petuch, Coltro & Berschauer, 2020)
- Conasprella vanhyningi (Rehder, 1944)
- Conasprella vantwoudti (Petuch, Berschauer & Poremski, 2015)
- Conasprella viminea (Reeve, 1849)
- Conasprella wakayamaensis (Kuroda, 1956)
- Conasprella wendrosi (Tenorio & Afonso, 2013)
- Conasprella ximenes (Gray, 1839)

The following species were brought into synonymy:

- Conasprella albobrunnea Bozzetti, 2017: synonym of Conasprella eucoronata (G. B. Sowerby III, 1903)
- Conasprella biraghii (G. Raybaudi Massilia, 1992): synonym of Lilliconus biraghii (G. Raybaudi Massilia, 1992)
- Conasprella cancellata Hwass in Bruguière, 1792: synonym of Conus cancellatus Hwass in Bruguière, 1792
- Conasprella guyanensis (Van Mol, 1973): synonym of Conasprella bajanensis (Nowell-Usticke, 1968)
- Conasprella hivanus (Moolenbeek, Zandbergen & Bouchet, 2008): synonym of Conasprella hivana (Moolenbeek, Zandbergen & Bouchet, 2008) (wrong gender agreement of specific epithet)
- Conasprella hypochlorus (Tomlin, 1937): synonym of Conasprella insculpta (Kiener, 1847)
- Conasprella sagei (Korn & G. Raybaudi Massilia, 1993): synonym of Lilliconus sagei (Korn & G. Raybaudi Massilia, 1993)

== List of synonyms of the genus Conasprella ==
- Bathyconus Tucker & Tenorio, 2009
- Boucheticonus Tucker & Tenorio, 2013
- Coltroconus Petuch, 2013
- Conasprella (Boucheticonus) Tucker & Tenorio, 2013 · accepted, alternate representation
- Conasprella (Coltroconus) Petuch, 2013 · accepted, alternate representation
- Conasprella (Conasprella) Thiele, 1929 · accepted, alternate representation
- Conasprella (Dalliconus) Tucker & Tenorio, 2009 · accepted, alternate representation
- Conasprella (Endemoconus) Iredale, 1931 · accepted, alternate representation
- Conasprella (Fusiconus) da Motta, 1991 · accepted, alternate representation
- Conasprella (Kohniconus) Tucker & Tenorio, 2009 · accepted, alternate representation
- Conasprella (Lilliconus) G. Raybaudi Massilia, 1994 · accepted, alternate representation
- Conasprella (Parviconus) Cotton & Godfrey, 1932 · accepted, alternate representation
- Conasprella (Pseudoconorbis) Tucker & Tenorio, 2009 · accepted, alternate representation
- Conasprella (Ximeniconus) Emerson & Old, 1962 · accepted, alternate representation
- Conus (Conasprella) Thiele, 1929
- Dalliconus Tucker & Tenorio, 2009
- Duodenticonus Tucker & Tenorio, 2013
- Endemoconus Iredale, 1931
- Fumiconus da Motta, 1991
- Fusiconus da Motta, 1991
- Globiconus Tucker & Tenorio, 2009
- Jaspidiconus Petuch, 2003
- Kermasprella Powell, 1958
- Kohniconus Tucker & Tenorio, 2009
- Lilliconus G. Raybaudi Massilia, 1994
- Mamiconus Cotton & Godfrey, 1932
- Parviconus Cotton & Godfrey, 1932
- Perplexiconus Tucker & Tenorio, 2009
- Pseudoconorbis Tucker & Tenorio, 2009
- Viminiconus Tucker & Tenorio, 2009
- Ximeniconus Emerson & Old, 1962
- Yeddoconus Tucker & Tenorio, 2009

== Significance of "alternative representation" ==
Prior to 2009, all cone species were placed within the family Conidae and were placed in one genus, Conus. In 2009 however, J.K. Tucker and M.J. Tenorio proposed a classification system for the over 600 recognized species that were in the family. Their classification proposed 3 distinct families and 82 genera for the living species of cone snails, including the family Conilithidae. This classification was based upon shell morphology, radular differences, anatomy, physiology, cladistics, with comparisons to molecular (DNA) studies. Published accounts of genera within the Conidae (or Conilithidae) that include the genus Conasprella include J.K. Tucker & M.J. Tenorio (2009), and Bouchet et al., (2011).

Testing in order to try to understand the molecular phylogeny of the Conidae was initially begun by Christopher Meyer and Alan Kohn, and is continuing, particularly with the advent of nuclear DNA testing in addition to mDNA testing.

However, in 2011, some experts preferred to use the traditional classification, where all species are placed in Conus within the single family Conidae: for example, according to the November 2011 version of the World Register of Marine Species, all species within the family Conidae are in the genus Conus. The binomial names of species in the 82 cone snail genera listed in Tucker & Tenorio 2009 are recognized by the World Register of Marine Species as "alternative representations." Debate within the scientific community regarding this issue continues, and additional molecular phylogeny studies are being carried out in an attempt to clarify the issue.

All this has been superseded in 2015 by the new classification of the Conidae
