= Conasprella alexandremonteiroi =

Scientific classification
- Kingdom: Animalia
- Phylum: Mollusca
- Class: Gastropoda
- Subclass: Caenogastropoda
- Order: Neogastropoda
- Superfamily: Conoidea
- Family: Conidae
- Genus: Conasprella
- Species: C. alexandremonteiroi

Binomial name
- Conasprella alexandremonteiroi (Cossignani, 2014)

Synonyms
- Conasprella (Ximeniconus) alexandremonteiroi (Cossignani, 2014) · accepted, alternate representation; Conus alexandremonteiroi (Cossignani, 2014); Jaspidiconus alexandremonteiroi Cossignani, 2014 · original combination

Species of gastropod

Conasprella alexandremonteiroi is a species of sea snail, a marine gastropod mollusc in the family Conidae, the cone snails, cone shells or cones.

== Distribution ==
This species occurs in the Caribbean Sea off Nicaragua.
