= Conasprella kantangana =

Scientific classification
- Kingdom: Animalia
- Phylum: Mollusca
- Class: Gastropoda
- Subclass: Caenogastropoda
- Order: Neogastropoda
- Superfamily: Conoidea
- Family: Conidae
- Genus: Conasprella
- Species: C. kantangana

Binomial name
- Conasprella kantangana (da Motta, 1982)

Synonyms
- Conasprella (Fusiconus) longurionis kantanganus (var.) (da Motta, 1982); Fusiconus (Fusiconus) kantanganus (da Motta, 1982)

Species of gastropod

Conasprella kantangana is a species of sea snail, a marine gastropod mollusk in the family Conidae, the cone snails and their allies.

== Description ==
The length of the shell varies between 27.4 mm and 29 mm.

== Distribution ==
This marine species occurs in the Indian Ocean and off Western Thailand.
