= Conasprella sargenti =

Scientific classification
- Kingdom: Animalia
- Phylum: Mollusca
- Class: Gastropoda
- Subclass: Caenogastropoda
- Order: Neogastropoda
- Superfamily: Conoidea
- Family: Conidae
- Genus: Conasprella
- Species: C. sargenti

Binomial name
- Conasprella sargenti (Petuch, 2013)

Synonyms
- Conasprella (Ximeniconus) sargenti (Petuch, 2013) · accepted, alternate representation; Conus sargenti (Petuch, 2013); Jaspidiconus sargenti Petuch, 2013 (original combination)

Species of gastropod

Conasprella sargenti is a species of sea snail, a marine gastropod mollusk in the family Conidae, the cone snails, cone shells or cones.
