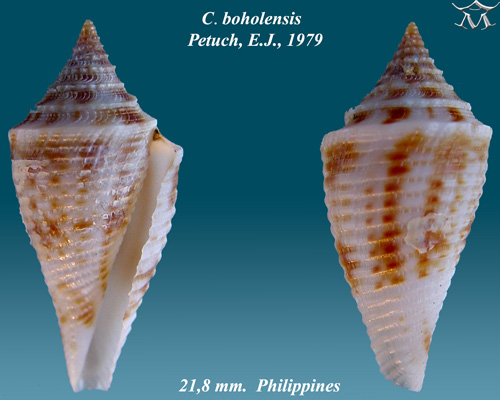
- Apertural and abapertural views of shell of Conasprella boholensis (Petuch, E.J., 1979)
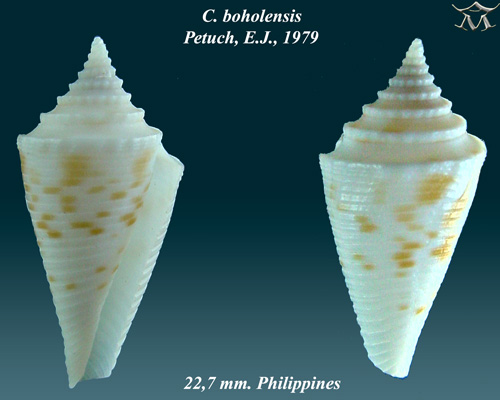

Conservation status
- Least Concern (IUCN 3.1)

Scientific classification
- Kingdom: Animalia
- Phylum: Mollusca
- Class: Gastropoda
- Subclass: Caenogastropoda
- Order: Neogastropoda
- Superfamily: Conoidea
- Family: Conidae
- Genus: Conasprella
- Species: C. boholensis

Binomial name
- Conasprella boholensis (Petuch, 1979)

Synonyms
- Conasprella (Conasprella) boholensis (Petuch, 1979) · accepted, alternate representation; Conus boholensis Petuch, 1979 (original combination); Yeddoconus boholensis (Petuch, 1979)

= Conasprella boholensis =

Species of gastropod

Conasprella boholensis is a species of sea snail, a marine gastropod mollusk in the family Conidae, the cone snails and their allies.

Like all species within the genus Conasprella, these snails are predatory and venomous. They are capable of stinging humans, therefore live ones should be handled carefully or not at all.

== Description ==
Original description: "Shell thin, delicate, glossy; outline straight sided, very elongate, tapering to anterior end; shoulder sharp, extremely carinate, bladelike; slight constriction just anterior to shoulder carina; early whorls strongly coronate; spire whorls excavated because of well developed carina; spire scalariform with carinae of previous whorls projecting beyond suture; body whorl sculpture consisting of 25-35 deeply incised spiral sulci; spire smooth with only faint radiating growth lines extending from suture to carina; color pure white with scattered red-brown dashes; spire color white with only a few scattered, crescent-shaped, red-brown flammules; aperture white; periostracum unknown."

The size of the shell varies between 22 mm and 51 mm.

== Distribution ==
Locus typicus: "Approximately 250 metres depth off Panglao, Bohol Isl., Philippines."

This marine species occurs off Somalia, the Philippines, Vietnam, New Caledonia and off Western Australia.
