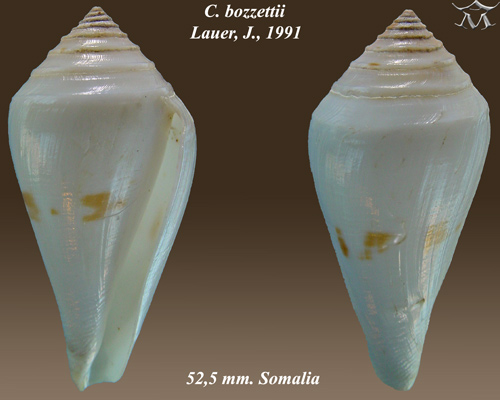
- Apertural and abapertural views of shell of Conasprella bozzettii (Lauer, J., 1991)
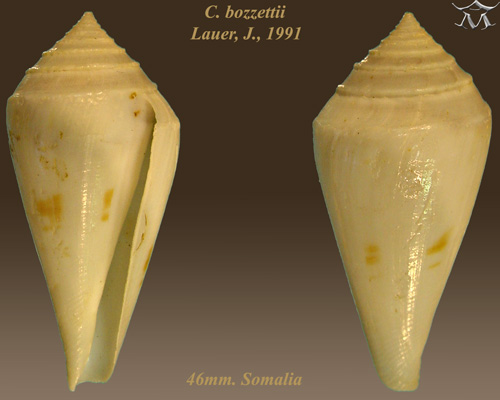

Scientific classification
- Kingdom: Animalia
- Phylum: Mollusca
- Class: Gastropoda
- Subclass: Caenogastropoda
- Order: Neogastropoda
- Superfamily: Conoidea
- Family: Conidae
- Genus: Conasprella
- Species: C. bozzettii

Binomial name
- Conasprella bozzettii (Lauer, 1991)

Synonyms
- Conasprella (Conasprella) bozzettii (Lauer, 1991) · accepted, alternate representation; Conus bozzettii Lauer, 1991 (original combination)

= Conasprella bozzettii =

Species of gastropod

Conasprella bozzettii is a species of sea snail, a marine gastropod mollusk in the family Conidae, the cone snails and their allies.

Like all species within the genus Conasprella, these snails are predatory and venomous. They are capable of stinging humans, therefore live ones should be handled carefully or not at all.

== Description ==
The size of the shell varies between 30 mm and 65 mm.

== Distribution ==
This marine species occurs off Northern Somalia.
