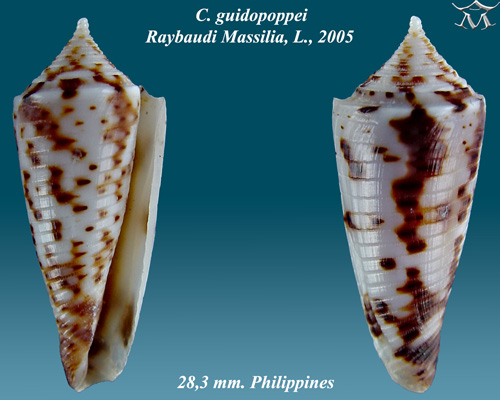
- Apertural and abapertural views of shell of Conasprella guidopoppei (Raybaudi Massilia, L., 2005)
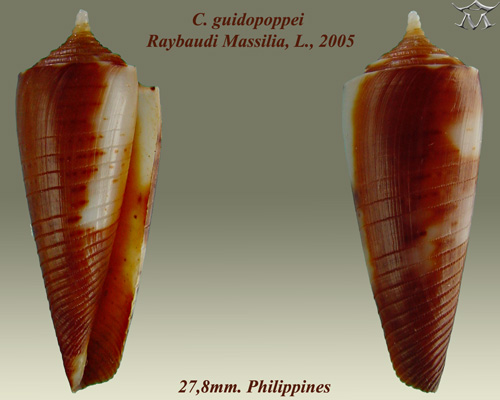

Conservation status
- Least Concern (IUCN 3.1)

Scientific classification
- Kingdom: Animalia
- Phylum: Mollusca
- Class: Gastropoda
- Subclass: Caenogastropoda
- Order: Neogastropoda
- Superfamily: Conoidea
- Family: Conidae
- Genus: Conasprella
- Species: C. guidopoppei

Binomial name
- Conasprella guidopoppei (Raybaudi Massilia, 2005)

Synonyms
- Asprella guidopoppei (G. Raybaudi Massilia, 2005); Conasprella (Fusiconus) guidopoppei (G. Raybaudi Massilia, 2005) · accepted, alternate representation; Conus guidopoppei G. Raybaudi Massilia, 2005 (original combination); Fumiconus guidopoppei (G. Raybaudi Massilia, 2005)

= Conasprella guidopoppei =

Species of gastropod

Conasprella guidopoppei is a species of sea snail, a marine gastropod mollusk in the family Conidae, the cone snails and their allies.

Like all species within the genus Conasprella, these snails are predatory and venomous. They are capable of stinging humans, therefore live ones should be handled carefully or not at all.

== Description ==
The size of the shell varies between 20 mm and 35 mm.

== Distribution ==
This marine species occurs off Palawan, the Philippines.
