= Conasprella herndli =

Scientific classification
- Kingdom: Animalia
- Phylum: Mollusca
- Class: Gastropoda
- Subclass: Caenogastropoda
- Order: Neogastropoda
- Superfamily: Conoidea
- Family: Conidae
- Genus: Conasprella
- Species: C. herndli

Binomial name
- Conasprella herndli (Petuch & R. F. Myers, 2014)

Synonyms
- Conasprella (Ximeniconus) herndli (Petuch & R. F. Myers, 2014) · accepted, alternate representation; Conus herndli (Petuch & R. F. Myers, 2014); Jaspidiconus herndli Petuch & R. F. Myers, 2014 (original combination)

Species of gastropod

Conasprella herndli is a species of sea snail, a marine gastropod mollusc in the family Conidae, the cone snails, cone shells or cones.

== Distribution ==
This species occurs in the Caribbean Sea.
