= Conasprella ogum =

Scientific classification
- Kingdom: Animalia
- Phylum: Mollusca
- Class: Gastropoda
- Subclass: Caenogastropoda
- Order: Neogastropoda
- Superfamily: Conoidea
- Family: Conidae
- Genus: Conasprella
- Species: C. ogum

Binomial name
- Conasprella ogum (Petuch & R. F. Myers, 2014)

Synonyms
- Conasprella (Ximeniconus) ogum (Petuch & R. F. Myers, 2014) · accepted, alternate representation; Conus ogum (Petuch & R. F. Myers, 2014); Jaspidiconus ogum Petuch & R. F. Myers, 2014 (original combination)

Species of gastropod

Conasprella ogum is a species of sea snail, a marine gastropod mollusc in the family Conidae, the cone snails, cone shells or cones.

== Description ==
This pustulated, shallow water species attains 20 mm in length.

== Distribution ==
This species occurs in the Caribbean Sea and as far south as Itaparica Island, Bahia, Brazil.
