= Conasprella pomponeti =

Scientific classification
- Kingdom: Animalia
- Phylum: Mollusca
- Class: Gastropoda
- Subclass: Caenogastropoda
- Order: Neogastropoda
- Superfamily: Conoidea
- Family: Conidae
- Genus: Conasprella
- Species: C. pomponeti

Binomial name
- Conasprella pomponeti (Petuch & R. F. Myers, 2014)

Synonyms
- Conasprella (Ximeniconus) pomponeti (Petuch & Myers, 2014) · accepted, alternate representation; Conus pomponeti (Petuch & Myers, 2014); Jaspidiconus pomponeti Petuch & R. F. Myers, 2014

Species of gastropod

Conasprella pomponeti is a species of sea snail, a marine gastropod mollusc in the family Conidae, the cone snails, cone shells or cones.

== Description ==
The size of the shell attains 12-15 mm.

== Distribution ==
This species occurs in the Atlantic Ocean off Brazil.
