= Conasprella janowskyae =

Scientific classification
- Kingdom: Animalia
- Phylum: Mollusca
- Class: Gastropoda
- Subclass: Caenogastropoda
- Order: Neogastropoda
- Superfamily: Conoidea
- Family: Conidae
- Genus: Conasprella
- Species: C. janowskyae

Binomial name
- Conasprella janowskyae (Tucker & Tenorio, 2011)

Synonyms
- Conasprella (Kohniconus) janowskyae (Tucker & Tenorio, 2011) · accepted, alternate representation; Conus janowskyae (Tucker & Tenorio, 2011); Kohniconus janowskyae Tucker & Tenorio, 2011 (original combination)

Species of gastropod

Conasprella janowskyae is a species of sea snail, a marine gastropod mollusk in the family Conidae, the cone snails and their allies.

Like all species within the genus Conasprella, these cone snails are predatory and venomous. They are capable of stinging humans, therefore live ones should be handled carefully or not at all.

== Description ==
The size of the shell varies between 30 mm and 40 mm.

== Distribution ==
This marine species occurs off Yucatán, Mexico to Colombia.
