= Conasprella henriquei =

Scientific classification
- Kingdom: Animalia
- Phylum: Mollusca
- Class: Gastropoda
- Subclass: Caenogastropoda
- Order: Neogastropoda
- Superfamily: Conoidea
- Family: Conidae
- Genus: Conasprella
- Species: C. henriquei

Binomial name
- Conasprella henriquei (Petuch & R. F. Myers, 2014)

Synonyms
- Coltroconus henriquei Petuch & R. F. Myers, 2014 (original combination); Conasprella (Coltroconus) henriquei (Petuch & R. F. Myers, 2014) · accepted, alternate representation; Conus henriquei (Petuch & R. F. Myers, 2014)

Species of gastropod

Conasprella henriquei is a species of sea snail, a marine gastropod mollusc in the family Conidae, the cone snails and their allies.

Like all species within the genus Conasprella, these snails are predatory and venomous. They are capable of stinging humans, therefore live ones should be handled carefully or not at all.

== Distribution ==
This species occurs in the Caribbean Sea.
