= Conasprella chinchorroensis =

Scientific classification
- Kingdom: Animalia
- Phylum: Mollusca
- Class: Gastropoda
- Subclass: Caenogastropoda
- Order: Neogastropoda
- Superfamily: Conoidea
- Family: Conidae
- Genus: Conasprella
- Species: C. chinchorroensis

Binomial name
- Conasprella chinchorroensis (Petuch, Berschauer & Poremski, 2017)

Synonyms
- Jaspidiconus chinchorroensis Petuch, Berschauer & Poremski, 2017 (original combination)

Species of gastropod

Conasprella chinchorroensis is a species of sea snail, a marine gastropod mollusc in the family Conidae, the cone snails, cone shells or cones.

== Description ==
Shell size is 15 mm.

== Distribution ==
This marine species occurs in the Caribbean Sea off Quintana Roo, Mexico.
