= Conasprella torensis =

Scientific classification
- Kingdom: Animalia
- Phylum: Mollusca
- Class: Gastropoda
- Subclass: Caenogastropoda
- Order: Neogastropoda
- Superfamily: Conoidea
- Family: Conidae
- Genus: Conasprella
- Species: C. torensis

Binomial name
- Conasprella torensis (Sturany, 1903)

Synonyms
- Conus aculeiformis f. torensis Sturany, 1903; Fusiconus (Fusiconus) torensis (Sturany, 1903)

Species of gastropod

Conasprella torensis is a rare species of sea snail, a marine gastropod mollusk in the family Conidae, the cone snails and their allies.

== Description ==
The length of the shell reaches up to 31 mm. They sport a hard outer shell that can vary in color and pattern with a screw like appearance that is on top of a conical main section.

== Distribution ==
This species main habitat is located in and around the Red Sea and Suez Canal.
