= Conasprella pepeiu =

Scientific classification
- Kingdom: Animalia
- Phylum: Mollusca
- Class: Gastropoda
- Subclass: Caenogastropoda
- Order: Neogastropoda
- Superfamily: Conoidea
- Family: Conidae
- Genus: Conasprella
- Species: C. pepeiu

Binomial name
- Conasprella pepeiu (Moolenbeek, Zandbergen & Bouchet, 2008)

Synonyms
- Bathyconus pepeiu (Moolenbeek, Zandbergen & Bouchet, 2008) accepted, alternate representation; Conus pepeiu Moolenbeek, Zandbergen & Bouchet, 2008 (original combination); Conasprella (Fusiconus) pepeiu (Moolenbeek, Zandbergen & Bouchet, 2008) · accepted, alternate representation

Species of gastropod

Conasprella pepeiu is a species of sea snail, a marine gastropod mollusk in the family Conidae, the cone snails and their allies.

Like all species within the genus Conasprella, these cone snails are predatory and venomous. They're capable of stinging humans, therefore live ones should be handled carefully or not at all.

== Description ==
The size of the shell attains 15 mm.

== Distribution ==
This marine species occurs off the Marquesas.
