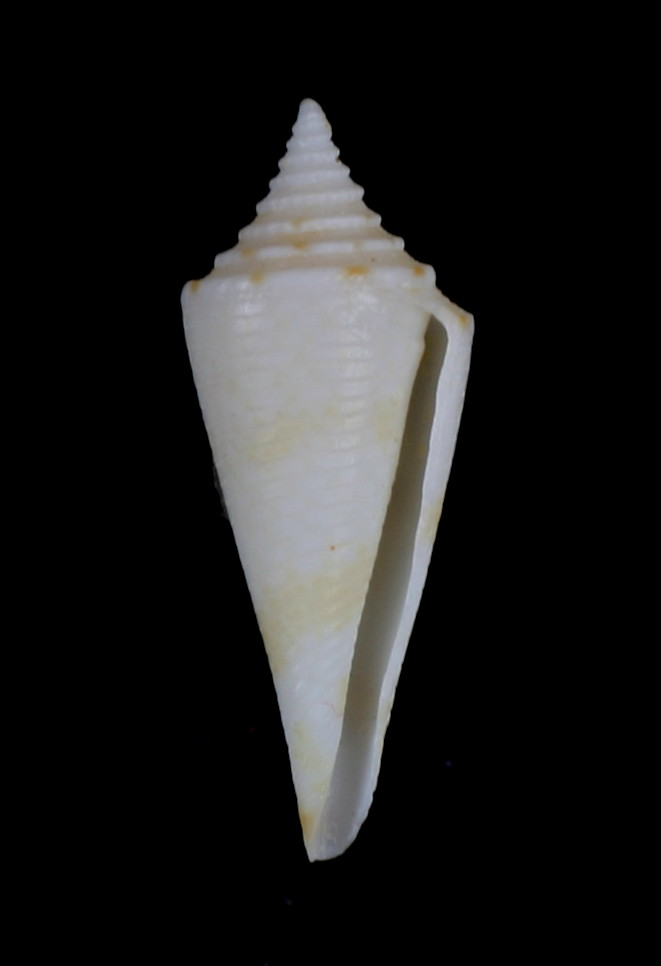
- Apertural view of shell of Conasprella saecularis (Melvill, 1898), measuring 21.8 mm in height, trawled at 80 fms. off Aliguay Island, in the Philippines

Conservation status
- Least Concern (IUCN 3.1)

Scientific classification
- Kingdom: Animalia
- Phylum: Mollusca
- Class: Gastropoda
- Subclass: Caenogastropoda
- Order: Neogastropoda
- Superfamily: Conoidea
- Family: Conidae
- Genus: Conasprella
- Species: C. saecularis

Binomial name
- Conasprella saecularis (Melvill, 1898)

Synonyms
- Asprella schepmani Fulton, H.C., 1936; Bathyconus saecularis (Melvill, 1898); Conasprella (Fusiconus) saecularis (Melvill, 1898) · accepted, alternate representation; Conus saecularis Melvill, 1898 (original combination)

= Conasprella saecularis =

Species of gastropod

Conasprella saecularis is a species of sea snail, a marine gastropod mollusk in the family Conidae, the cone snails and their allies.

Like all species within the genus Conasprella, these cone snails are predatory and venomous. They are capable of stinging humans, therefore live ones should be handled carefully or not at all.

== Description ==
The size of the shell varies between 17 mm and 40 mm.

== Distribution ==
The marine species occurs in the Persian Gulf and in the Western Pacific.

== Gallery ==
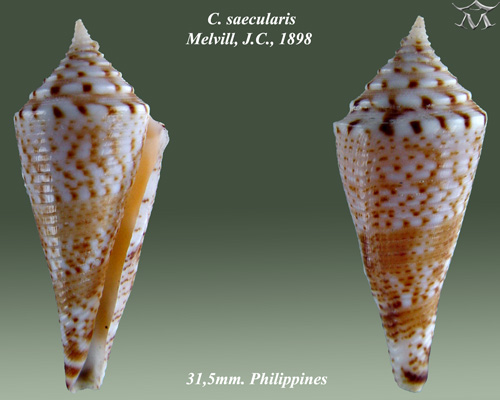
Conasprella saecularis (Melvill, J.C., 1898)

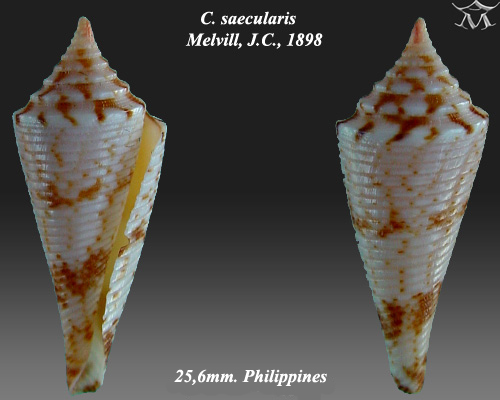
Conasprella saecularis (Melvill, J.C., 1898)

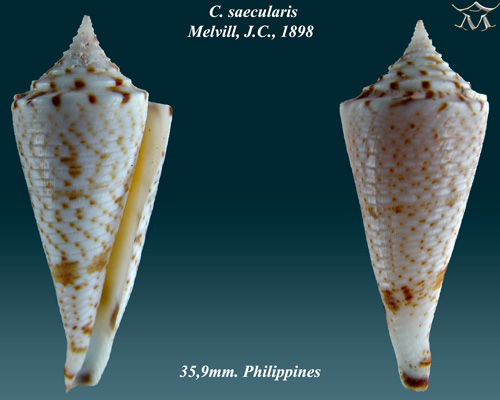
Conasprella saecularis (Melvill, J.C., 1898)

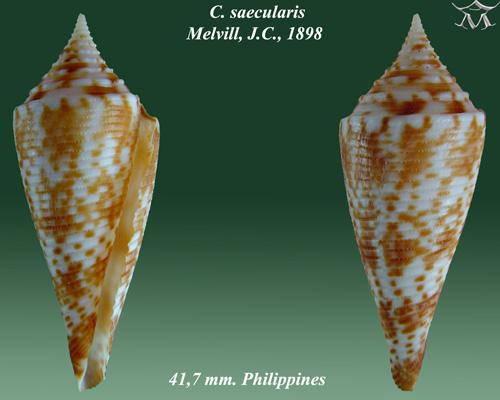
Conasprella saecularis (Melvill, J.C., 1898)

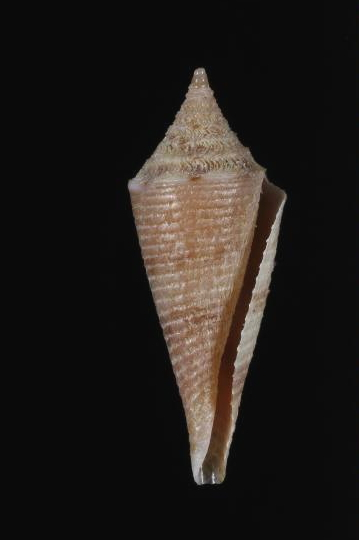
Conasprella saecularis (museum specimen at MNHN, Paris)
