= Conasprella berschaueri =

Scientific classification
- Kingdom: Animalia
- Phylum: Mollusca
- Class: Gastropoda
- Subclass: Caenogastropoda
- Order: Neogastropoda
- Superfamily: Conoidea
- Family: Conidae
- Genus: Conasprella
- Species: C. berschaueri

Binomial name
- Conasprella berschaueri (Petuch & R. F. Myers, 2014)

Synonyms
- Conasprella (Ximeniconus) berschaueri (Petuch & R. F. Myers, 2014) · accepted, alternate representation; Conus berschaueri (Petuch & R. F. Myers, 2014); Jaspidiconus berschaueri Petuch & R. F. Myers, 2014 (original combination)

Species of gastropod

Conasprella berschaueri is a species of sea snail, a marine gastropod mollusc in the family Conidae, the cone snails, cone shells or cones.

This species was named after David Berschauer, editor of the malacological journal The Festivus.

== Description ==
The size of the shell attains 16 mm. Its appearance is described as pink or pinkish-orange. Prefers quiet water and clean carbonate sand near coral reefs or coral rubble.

== Distribution ==
This species can be found in the Caribbean Sea off St. Maarten, West Indies. It is endemic to Sint Maarten and is listed in the appendix of protected species.
