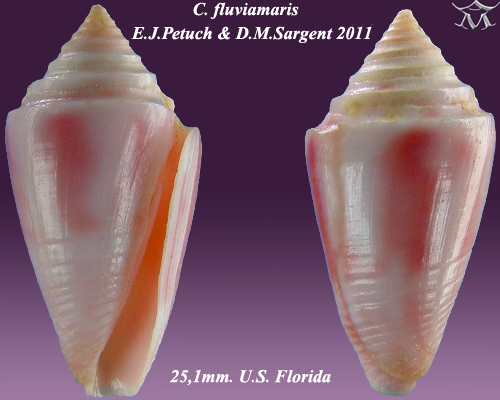
- Apertural and abapertural views of shell of Conasprella fluviamaris (E.J.Petuch & D.M.Sargent 2011)
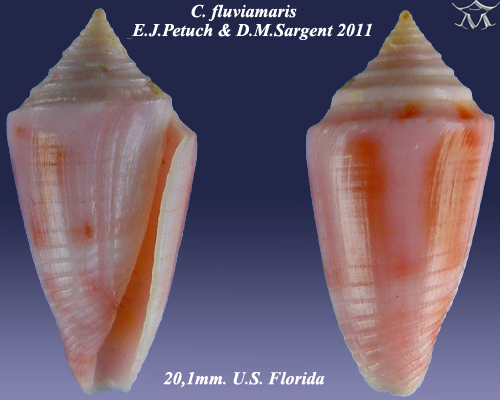

Scientific classification
- Kingdom: Animalia
- Phylum: Mollusca
- Class: Gastropoda
- Subclass: Caenogastropoda
- Order: Neogastropoda
- Superfamily: Conoidea
- Family: Conidae
- Genus: Conasprella
- Species: C. fluviamaris

Binomial name
- Conasprella fluviamaris (Petuch & Sargent, 2011)

Synonyms
- Conasprella (Ximeniconus) fluviamaris (Petuch & Sargent, 2011) · accepted, alternate representation; Conus fluviamaris (Petuch & Sargent, 2011); Jaspidiconus fluviamaris Petuch & Sargent, 2011 (original combination)

= Conasprella fluviamaris =

Species of sea snail

Conasprella fluviamaris is a species of sea snail, a marine gastropod mollusk in the family Conidae, the cone snails and their allies.

Like all species within the genus Conasprella, these cone snails are predatory and venomous. They are capable of stinging humans, therefore live ones should be handled carefully or not at all.

== Description ==
The size of the shell varies between 11 mm and 17 mm.

== Distribution ==
This marine species occurs off Southeast Florida and Dry Tortugas, USA.
