= Conasprella somalica =

Scientific classification
- Kingdom: Animalia
- Phylum: Mollusca
- Class: Gastropoda
- Subclass: Caenogastropoda
- Order: Neogastropoda
- Superfamily: Conoidea
- Family: Conidae
- Genus: Conasprella
- Species: C. somalica

Binomial name
- Conasprella somalica (Bozzetti, 2013)

Synonyms
- Conasprella (Endemoconus) somalica (Bozzetti, 2013) · accepted, alternate representation; Conus somalicus (Bozzetti, 2013); Endemoconus somalicus (Bozzetti, 2013); Yeddoconus somalicus Bozzetti, 2013 (original combination)

Species of gastropod

Conasprella somalica is a species of sea snail, a marine gastropod mollusk in the family Conidae, the cone snails and their allies. Cone snails are marine gastropod molluscs known for their venomous harpoon-like radula used to capture prey. The species was originally described in 2013 and is currently recognised under the genus Conasprella in modern taxonomic classifications, as listed in the World Register of Marine Species.

== Description ==
The shell of Conasprella somalica is relatively small for a cone snail, reaching approximately 23 to 29 mm in length in recorded specimens. Like other members of the family Conidae, it possesses a conical shell shape. Detailed morphological characteristics were provided in the original species description published in 2013.

== Distribution and habitat ==
This marine species occurs off the coast of north-eastern Somalia. Specimens have been recorded from relatively deep waters on the continental shelf and slope, indicating a deep-water marine habitat.
