= Conasprella joanae =

Scientific classification
- Kingdom: Animalia
- Phylum: Mollusca
- Class: Gastropoda
- Subclass: Caenogastropoda
- Order: Neogastropoda
- Superfamily: Conoidea
- Family: Conidae
- Genus: Conasprella
- Species: C. joanae

Binomial name
- Conasprella joanae (Petuch & Berschauer, 2018)

Synonyms
- Jaspidiconus joanae Petuch & Berschauer, 2018 (original combination)

Species of gastropod

Conasprella joanae is a species of sea snail, a marine gastropod mollusc in the family Conidae, the cone snails, cone shells or cones.

== Distribution ==
This marine species occurs in the Atlantic Ocean off Rio Grande do Norte, Brazil.
