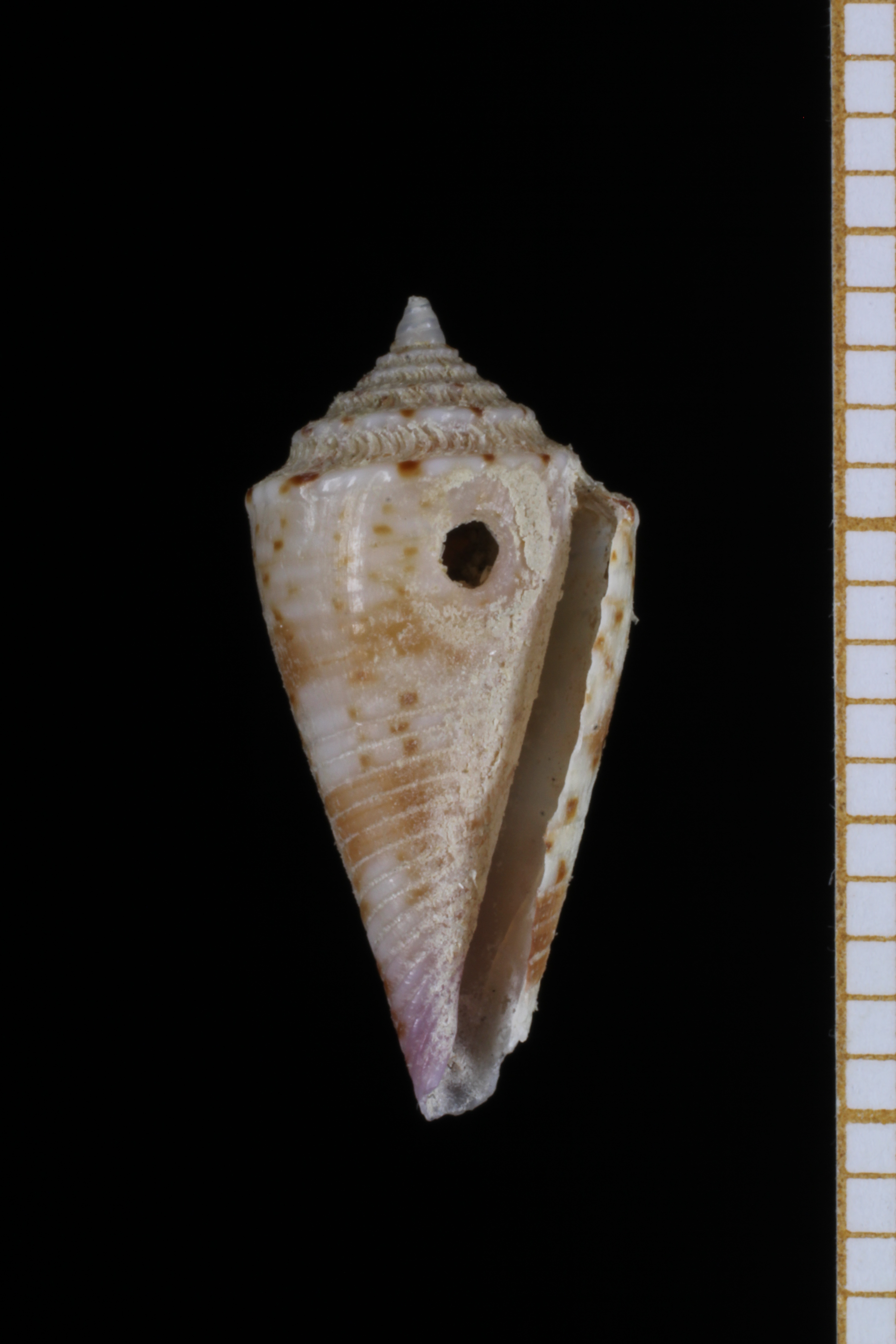
- Shell of Conasprella lorenzi (specimen at MNHN, Paris)

Scientific classification
- Kingdom: Animalia
- Phylum: Mollusca
- Class: Gastropoda
- Subclass: Caenogastropoda
- Order: Neogastropoda
- Superfamily: Conoidea
- Family: Conidae
- Genus: Conasprella
- Species: C. lorenzi

Binomial name
- Conasprella lorenzi Monnier & Limpalaër, 2012

Synonyms
- Conasprella (Conasprella) lorenzi Monnier & Limpalaër, 2012 · accepted, alternate representation; Conus lorenzi (Monnier & Limpalaër, 2012)

= Conasprella lorenzi =

Species of gastropod

Conasprella lorenzi is a species of sea snail, a marine gastropod mollusc in the family Conidae, the cone snails and their allies.

Like all species within the genus Conasprella, these snails are predatory and venomous. They are capable of stinging humans, therefore live ones should be handled carefully or not at all.

== Description ==
The size of the shell attains 27 mm.

== Distribution ==
This species occurs in the Indian Ocean in the Mozambique Channel and off KwaZulu-Natal, South Africa.
