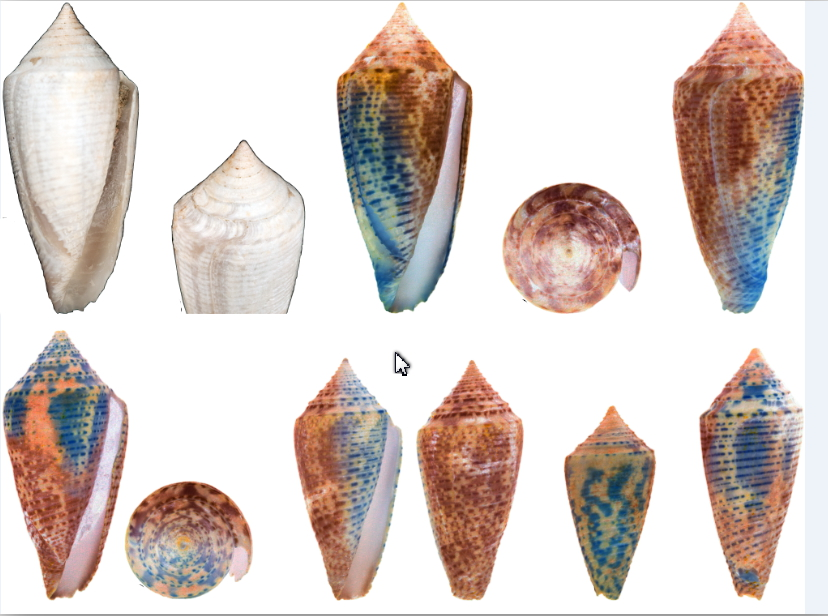
- Several shells of Conasprella ageri

Scientific classification
- Kingdom: Animalia
- Phylum: Mollusca
- Class: Gastropoda
- Subclass: Caenogastropoda
- Order: Neogastropoda
- Superfamily: Conoidea
- Family: Conidae
- Genus: Conasprella
- Species: C. ageri

Binomial name
- Conasprella ageri (Hendricks, 2015

Synonyms
- † Conasprella (Ximeniconus) ageri Hendricks, 2015 · accepted, alternate representation

= Conasprella ageri =

Conasprella ageri Temporal range: Lower Pliocene

Extinct species of gastropod

Conasprella ageri is an extinct species of sea snail, a marine gastropod mollusk in the family Conidae, the cone snails and their allies.

== Description ==
The largest shell found has a length of 32.5 mm.

== Distribution ==
It is only known as a fossil from the lower Pliocene Gurabo Formation in the Dominican Republic.
