= Conasprella ramalhoi =

Scientific classification
- Kingdom: Animalia
- Phylum: Mollusca
- Class: Gastropoda
- Subclass: Caenogastropoda
- Order: Neogastropoda
- Superfamily: Conoidea
- Family: Conidae
- Genus: Conasprella
- Species: C. ramalhoi

Binomial name
- Conasprella ramalhoi (Coomans, Moolenbeek & Wils, 1986)

Synonyms
- Conasprella elegans ramalhoi (Coomans, Moolenbeek & Wils, 1986); Conus elegans ramalhoi Coomans, Moolenbeek & Wils, 1986; Fusiconus (Fusiconus) ramalhoi (Coomans, Moolenbeek & Wils, 1986); Fusiconus elegans ramalhoi (Coomans, Moolenbeek & Wils, 1986)

Species of gastropod

Conasprella ramalhoi is a species of sea snail, a marine gastropod mollusk in the family Conidae, the cone snails and their allies.

== Description ==
The length of the shell varies between 18 mm and 40 mm.

== Distribution ==
This marine species occurs off Mozambique and Eastern Africa.
