= Conasprella nereis =

Scientific classification
- Kingdom: Animalia
- Phylum: Mollusca
- Class: Gastropoda
- Subclass: Caenogastropoda
- Order: Neogastropoda
- Superfamily: Conoidea
- Family: Conidae
- Genus: Conasprella
- Species: C. nereis

Binomial name
- Conasprella nereis (Petuch, 1979)

Synonyms
- Conus nereis Petuch, 1979

Species of gastropod

Conasprella nereis is a species of sea snail, a marine gastropod mollusk in the family Conidae, the cone snails and their allies.

== Description ==
The length of the shell varies between 19 mm and 27 mm. "Shell of Conasprella nereis is thin delicate smooth and glossy, its outline straight-sided and elongate; the shoulder is smooth, sharp and distinctly carinate with a small groove just anterior to the shoulder carina. The anterior one-third of the shell has six to eight wide and deeply incised spiral sulci. Shell colour is pale blue-white with three light brown bands: one just anterior to the shoulder, one at mid-body and one anterior to the mid-body line. Three to four rows of alternating brown and white dashes between brown bands: dashes are rectangular-shaped, giving the shell a checkerboard effect. Spire colour is white with alternating dark brown, crescent-shaped brown flammules, said flammules extending from the suture across the shoulder, on to the body whorl, producing a pattern of alternating white and dark brown dashes along the shoulder carina. The aperture of the shell is pale lilac, and its periostracum is thin, smooth and translucent yellow-brown."

== Distribution ==
Locus typicus: "Approximately 250 metres depth off Panglao, Bohol Isl., Philippines."

This marine species occurs off the Philippines and in the Makassar Strait.

== Habitat ==
"Like Conus aphrodite and Conus boholensis, Conus nereis is a member of the mud bottom community that borders the Philippine Trenches. It is sympatric with the same gastropods."
