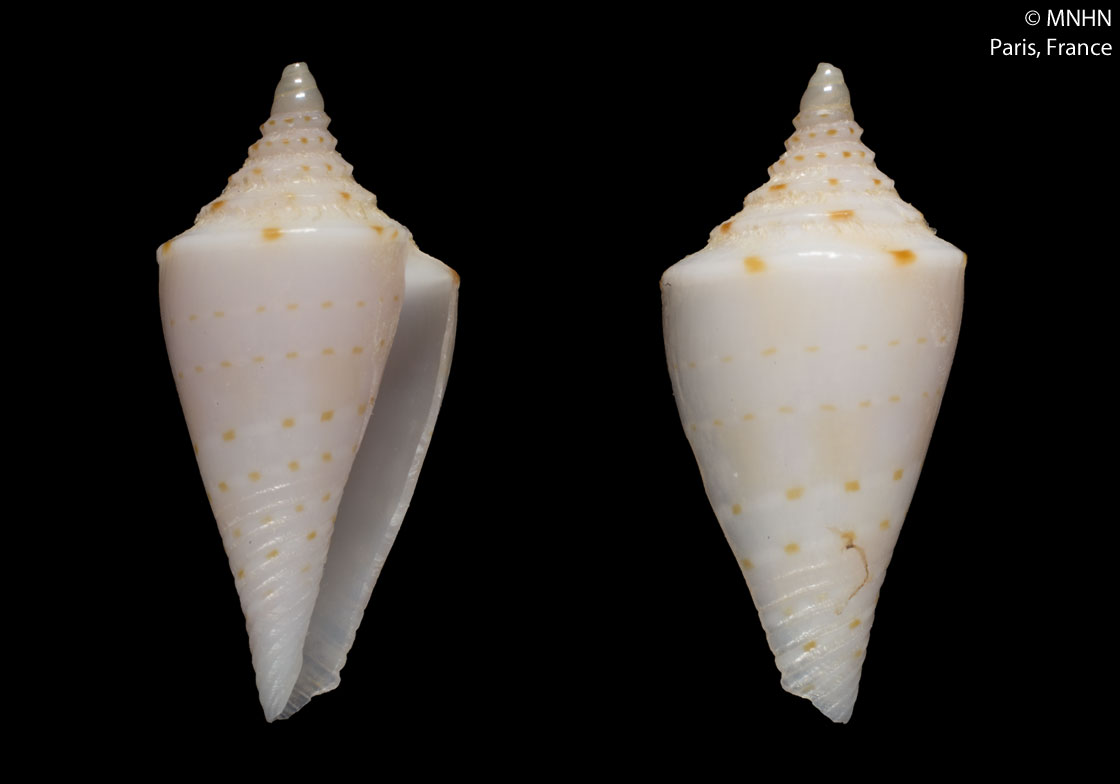
- Shell of Conasprella tiki (specimen at MNHN, Paris)

Scientific classification
- Kingdom: Animalia
- Phylum: Mollusca
- Class: Gastropoda
- Subclass: Caenogastropoda
- Order: Neogastropoda
- Superfamily: Conoidea
- Family: Conidae
- Genus: Conasprella
- Species: C. tiki

Binomial name
- Conasprella tiki (Moolenbeek, Zandbergen & Bouchet, 2008)

Synonyms
- Bathyconus tiki (Moolenbeek, Zandbergen & Bouchet, 2008); Conasprella (Fusiconus) tiki (Moolenbeek, Zandbergen & Bouchet, 2008) · accepted, alternate representation; Conus tiki (Moolenbeek, Zandbergen & Bouchet, 2008) (original combination)

= Conasprella tiki =

Species of gastropod

Conasprella tiki is a species of sea snail, a marine gastropod mollusk in the family Conidae, the cone snails and their allies.

Like all species within the genus Conasprella, these cone snails are predatory and venomous. They are capable of stinging humans, therefore live ones should be handled carefully or not at all.

== Description ==
The size of the shell varies between 14 mm and 28 mm.

== Distribution ==
This marine species occurs off the Marquesas and the Tuamotus. It is a benthic species, living on the seabed, and has been recorded at depths of 200-300 meters.
