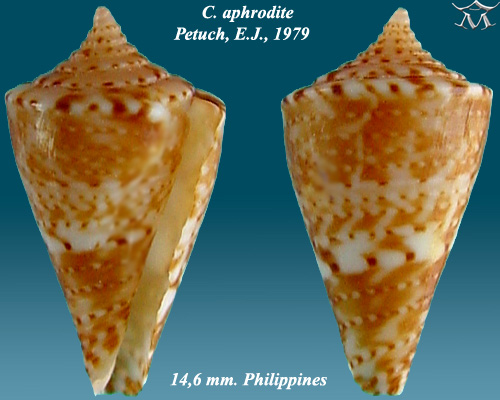
- Apertural and abapertural views of shell of Conasprella aphrodite (Petuch, E.J., 1979)
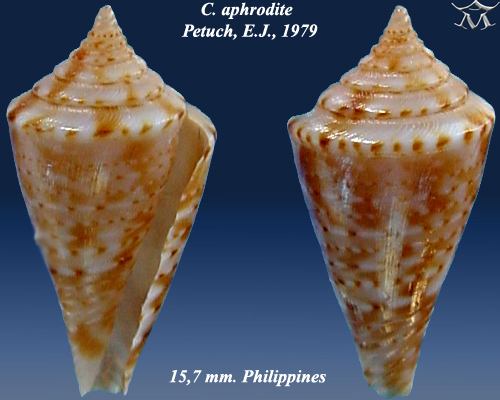

Conservation status
- Least Concern (IUCN 3.1)

Scientific classification
- Kingdom: Animalia
- Phylum: Mollusca
- Class: Gastropoda
- Subclass: Caenogastropoda
- Order: Neogastropoda
- Superfamily: Conoidea
- Family: Conidae
- Genus: Conasprella
- Species: C. aphrodite

Binomial name
- Conasprella aphrodite (Petuch, 1979)

Synonyms
- Conasprella (Conasprella) aphrodite (Petuch, 1979) · accepted, alternate representation; Conus aphrodite Petuch, 1979 (original combination)

= Conasprella aphrodite =

Species of gastropod

Conasprella aphrodite is a species of sea snail, a marine gastropod mollusk in the family Conidae, the cone snails and their allies.

Like all species within the genus Conus, these snails are predatory and venomous. They are capable of stinging humans, therefore live ones should be handled carefully or not at all.

== Description ==
Original description: "Shell thin, delicate, lightweight, glossy; outline straight sided, elongate, tapered toward the anterior end; shoulder smooth, sharp, slightly carinate; anterior one third with 6-8 faint spiral sulci; color lilac-purple with 3 bands of chestnut-brown flammules; base color pattern overlaid with 12 revolving rows of white and brown dots and dashes; one row of dashes just anterior of midbody line always more prominent than others; spire purple with alternating brown flammules; edge of shoulder with alternating brown and white dashes; aperture purple; periostracum thin, smooth, translucent yellow."

The size of the shell varies between 15 mm and 24 mm. Their shell shape and design may differ, but will always be a cone shape. Their shell colors will vary from a light brown with white flecks to all black.

When these snails feel threatened, they can shoot poison from their mouths that are in the shape of needles.

== Distribution ==
Locus typicus: "Approximately 250 metres depth, off Panglao, Bohol Isl., Philippines."

This marine species occurs off the Philippines, New Caledonia and the Ryukyus, Japan.
