= Conasprella hivana =

Scientific classification
- Kingdom: Animalia
- Phylum: Mollusca
- Class: Gastropoda
- Subclass: Caenogastropoda
- Order: Neogastropoda
- Superfamily: Conoidea
- Family: Conidae
- Genus: Conasprella
- Species: C. hivana

Binomial name
- Conasprella hivana (Moolenbeek, Zandbergen & Bouchet, 2008)

Synonyms
- Conasprella hivanus (Moolenbeek, Zandbergen & Bouchet, 2008); Conus (Strategoconus) hivanus Moolenbeek, Zandbergen & Bouchet, 2008; Conus hivanus Moolenbeek, Zandbergen & Bouchet, 2008; Gladioconus hivanus (Moolenbeek, Zandbergen & Bouchet, 2008); Rolaniconus hivanus (Moolenbeek, Zandbergen & Bouchet, 2008)

Species of gastropod

Conasprella hivana is a species of sea snail, a marine gastropod mollusk in the family Conidae, the cone snails and their allies.

== Description ==
The length of the shell attains 16 mm.

== Distribution ==
This species occurs in the Pacific Ocean off the Marquesas.
