= Conasprella marcusi =

Scientific classification
- Kingdom: Animalia
- Phylum: Mollusca
- Class: Gastropoda
- Subclass: Caenogastropoda
- Order: Neogastropoda
- Superfamily: Conoidea
- Family: Conidae
- Genus: Conasprella
- Species: C. marcusi

Binomial name
- Conasprella marcusi (Petuch, Berschauer & Poremski, 2016)

Synonyms
- Conasprella (Ximeniconus) marcusi (Petuch, Berschauer & Poremski, 2016); Jaspidiconus marcusi Petuch, Berschauer & Poremski, 2016

Species of gastropod

Conasprella marcusi is a species of sea snail, a marine gastropod mollusk in the family Conidae, the cone snails and their allies.

== Distribution ==
This marine species occurs off the Bahamas.
