= Conasprella berwerthi =

Scientific classification
- Kingdom: Animalia
- Phylum: Mollusca
- Class: Gastropoda
- Subclass: Caenogastropoda
- Order: Neogastropoda
- Superfamily: Conoidea
- Family: Conidae
- Genus: Conasprella
- Species: C. berwerthi

Binomial name
- Conasprella berwerthi (Hoernes & Auinger, 1879)

Synonyms
- † Conus (Conospirus) antidiluvianus f. excatenata Sacco, 1893; † Conus (Leptoconus) berwerthi Hoernes & Auinger, 1879; † Conus berwerthi Hoernes & Auinger, 1879

Extinct species of gastropod

Conasprella berwerthi is an extinct species of sea snail, a marine gastropod mollusk in the family Conidae, the cone snails and their allies.

== Distribution ==
Fossils of this marine species were found in Austria.
