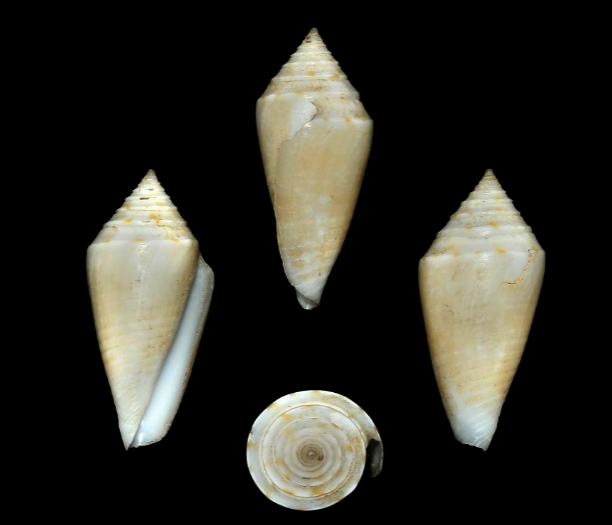
- Shel land protoconch of Conasprella agassizi (lectotype at the Smithsonian Institution)

Scientific classification
- Domain: Eukaryota
- Kingdom: Animalia
- Phylum: Mollusca
- Class: Gastropoda
- Subclass: Caenogastropoda
- Order: Neogastropoda
- Superfamily: Conoidea
- Family: Conidae
- Genus: Conasprella
- Species: C. agassizi

Binomial name
- Conasprella agassizi (Dall, 1886)

Synonyms
- Conus agassizii Dall, 1886 (original combination); Jaspidiconus agassizi (Dall, 1886)

= Conasprella agassizi =

Species of gastropod

Conasprella agassizi is a species of sea snail, a marine gastropod mollusk in the family Conidae, the cone snails and their allies.

Like all species within the genus Conasprella, these snails are predatory and venomous. They are capable of stinging humans, therefore live ones should be handled carefully or not at all.

== Distribution ==
This marine species occurs in the Caribbean Sea off St. Croix Island at a depth of 214 m; also off Bermuda, and West coast Barbados at 150 m. depth.

== Description ==
The maximum recorded shell length is 24 mm.
