= Conasprella roatanensis =

Scientific classification
- Kingdom: Animalia
- Phylum: Mollusca
- Class: Gastropoda
- Subclass: Caenogastropoda
- Order: Neogastropoda
- Superfamily: Conoidea
- Family: Conidae
- Genus: Conasprella
- Species: C. roatanensis

Binomial name
- Conasprella roatanensis (Petuch & Sargent, 2011)

Synonyms
- Conasprella (Ximeniconus) roatanensis (Petuch & Sargent, 2011) · accepted, alternate representation; Conus roatanensis (Petuch & Sargent, 2011); Jaspidiconus roatanensis Petuch & Sargent, 2011 (original combination)

Species of gastropod

Conasprella roatanensis is a species of sea snail, a marine gastropod mollusk in the family Conidae, the cone snails and their allies.

Like all species within the genus Conasprella, these cone snails are predatory and venomous. They are capable of stinging humans, therefore live ones should be handled carefully or not at all.

== Description ==
The size shell varies between 13 and 16 mm (0.51 and 0.63 in).

== Distribution ==
This species occurs in the Caribbean Sea off Bay Islands, Honduras
