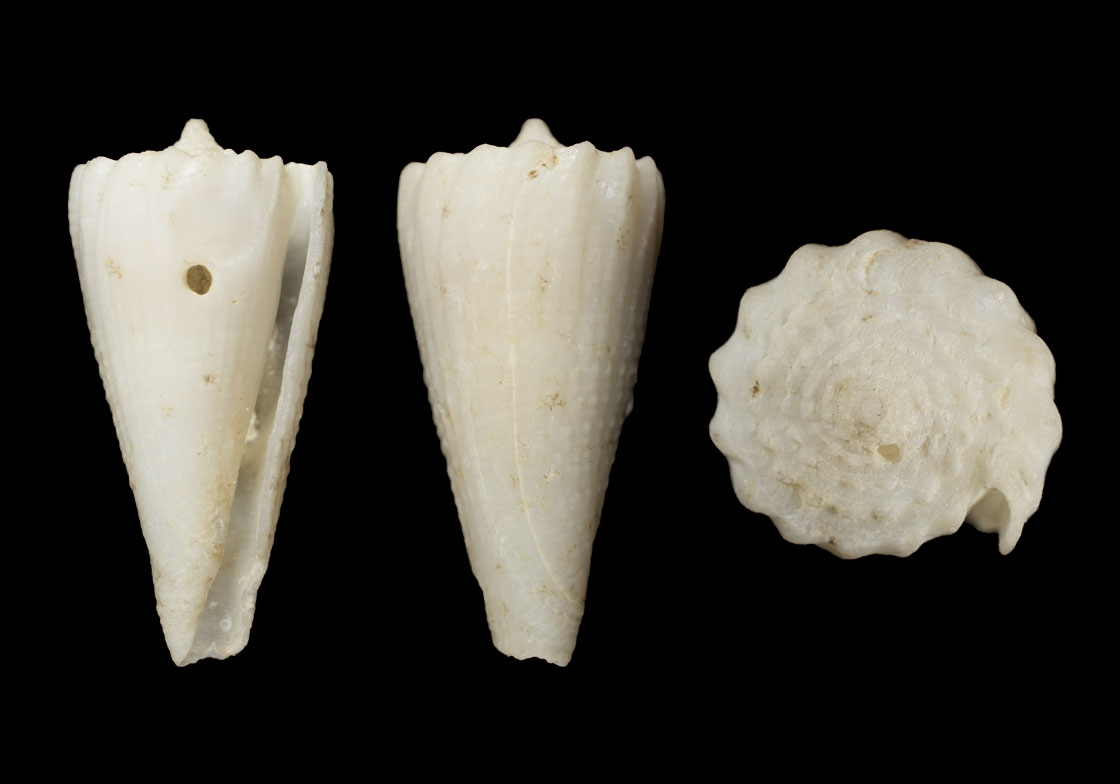
- Shell of Conasprella paumotu (holotype in MNHN, Paris)

Scientific classification
- Kingdom: Animalia
- Phylum: Mollusca
- Class: Gastropoda
- Subclass: Caenogastropoda
- Order: Neogastropoda
- Superfamily: Conoidea
- Family: Conidae
- Genus: Conasprella
- Species: C. paumotu

Binomial name
- Conasprella paumotu (Rabiller & Richard, 2014)

Synonyms
- Conus paumotu Rabiller & Richard, 2014

= Conasprella paumotu =

Species of gastropod

Conasprella paumotu is a species of sea snail, a marine gastropod mollusk in the family Conidae, the cone snails and their allies.

== Description ==
The length of the shell attains 16 mm.

== Distribution ==
This species occurs in the Pacific Ocean off the Tuamotu archipel.
