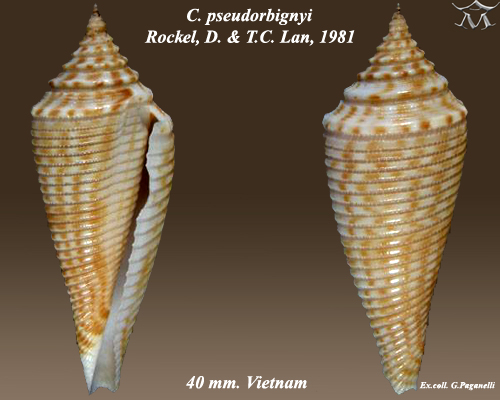
- Apertural and abapertural views of shell of Conasprella pseudorbignyi (Rockel, D. & T.C. Lan, 1981)

Scientific classification
- Kingdom: Animalia
- Phylum: Mollusca
- Class: Gastropoda
- Subclass: Caenogastropoda
- Order: Neogastropoda
- Superfamily: Conoidea
- Family: Conidae
- Genus: Conasprella
- Species: C. pseudorbignyi

Binomial name
- Conasprella pseudorbignyi (Röckel & Lan, 1981)

Synonyms
- Bathyconus pseudorbignyi (Röckel & Lan, 1981); Conasprella (Fusiconus) pseudorbignyi (Röckel & Lan, 1981) · accepted, alternate representation; Conus pseudorbignyi Röckel & Lan, 1981 (original combination)

= Conasprella pseudorbignyi =

Species of gastropod

Conasprella pseudorbignyi is a species of sea snail, a marine gastropod mollusk in the family Conidae, the cone snails and their allies.

Like all species within the genus Conasprella, these cone snails are predatory and venomous. They are capable of stinging humans, therefore live ones should be handled carefully or not at all.

== Description ==
The size of the shell varies between 30 mm and 55 mm.

== Distribution ==
This marine species occurs off Taiwan to Indonesia; off Fiji.
