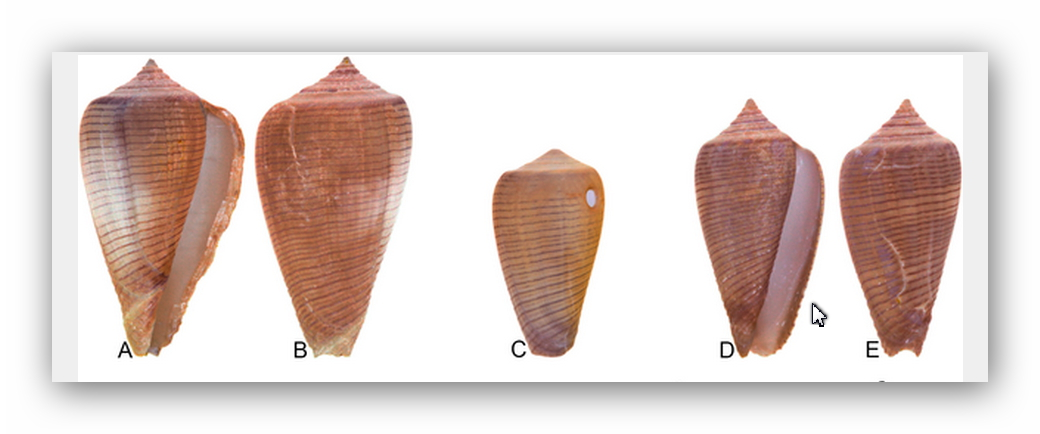
- Several views of a shell of Conasprella cercadensis

Scientific classification
- Domain: Eukaryota
- Kingdom: Animalia
- Phylum: Mollusca
- Class: Gastropoda
- Subclass: Caenogastropoda
- Order: Neogastropoda
- Superfamily: Conoidea
- Family: Conidae
- Genus: Conasprella
- Species: C. cercadensis

Binomial name
- Conasprella cercadensis (Maury, 1917)

Synonyms
- † Conasprella (Ximeniconus) cercadensis (Maury, 1917) · accepted, alternate representation; † Conus cercadensis Maury, 1917 † (original combination); † Perplexiconus cercadensis (Maury), Tucker and Tenorio, 2009

= Conasprella cercadensis =

Species of mollusc (snail; fossil)

Conasprella cercadensis is an extinct species of sea snail, a marine gastropod mollusk in the family Conidae, the cone snails, cone shells or cones.

== Description ==
The shell pattern consists of about 30–40 spiral lines, extending from base to shoulder; these coincide with the raised posterior edges of spiral ribs on the anterior half of the body whorl. The sutural ramp is unpigmented.

== Distribution ==
This marine species was found as a fossil in a Neogene coral reef-associated deposit in the Dominican Republic.
