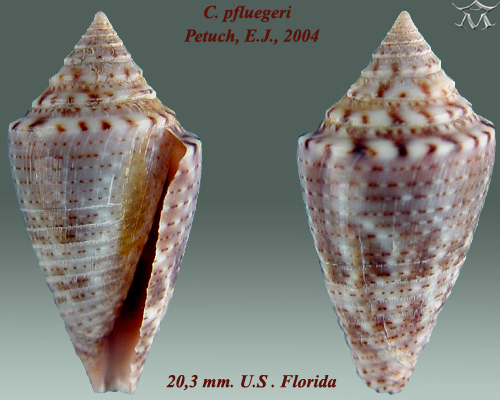
- Apertural and abapertural views of shell of Conasprella pfluegeri (Petuch, 2003)
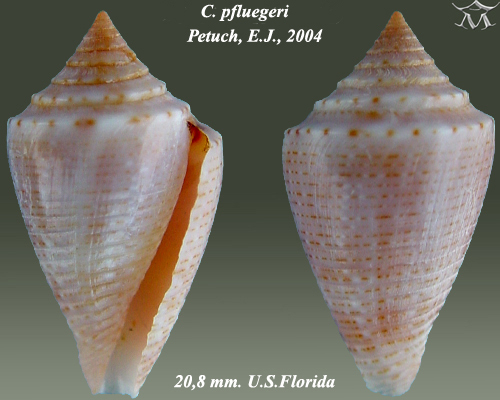

Scientific classification
- Kingdom: Animalia
- Phylum: Mollusca
- Class: Gastropoda
- Subclass: Caenogastropoda
- Order: Neogastropoda
- Superfamily: Conoidea
- Family: Conidae
- Genus: Conasprella
- Species: C. pfluegeri

Binomial name
- Conasprella pfluegeri (Petuch, 2003)

Synonyms
- Conasprella (Ximeniconus) pfluegeri (Petuch, 2003) · accepted, alternate representation; Conus jaspideus pfluegeri (Petuch, 2003); Conus pfluegeri Petuch, 2003; Jaspidiconus jaspideus pfluegeri Petuch, 2003; Jaspidiconus pfluegeri Petuch, 2003

= Conasprella pfluegeri =

Species of gastropod

Conasprella pfluegeri is a species of sea snail, a marine gastropod mollusk in the family Conidae, the cone snails and their allies.

Like all species within the genus Conasprella, these cone snails are predatory and venomous. They are capable of stinging humans, therefore live ones should be handled carefully or not at all.

== Description ==
Conasprella pfluegeri (originally described as Jaspidiconus pfluegeri) is a species of small, predatory sea snail in the family Conidae. It is a marine gastropod found in the shallow waters of the western Atlantic Ocean, specifically endemic to the coast of Southeast Florida.

The shell of Conasprella pfluegeri is small, typically ranging in length from 15 mm to 25 mm. According to the original description by Edward Petuch (2003), the shell is characterized by:

- Shape: Fusiform (spindle-shaped) with a stocky body whorl and slightly rounded sides.
- Spire: High, elevated, and subpyramidal with a distinct "stepped" (scalariform) appearance.
- Shoulder: Sharply angled and edged with a prominent, smooth carina (ridge).
- Coloration: The shell is typically described as uniformly pure white with a shiny, smooth surface, lacking the complex patterns found on many other cone snails.
- Sculpture: The anterior half of the body whorl usually features deeply incised spiral grooves (sulci), while the posterior half is smooth.

== Distribution and Habitat ==
This species has a highly restricted range (locus typicus) in Southeast Florida. It was originally discovered and described from specimens collected at the southern end of Singer Island, Palm Beach County.

- Specific Locality: The type lot was found in shallow water (approximately 3 meters depth) buried in sand under the Blue Heron Boulevard Bridge, a well-known site for marine biodiversity.
- Habitat: It inhabits shallow, sub-tidal sandy environments where it can bury itself to hunt.

== Ecology ==
Like all members of the genus Conasprella and the wider family Conidae, C. pfluegeri is carnivorous and venomous. It uses a specialized radular tooth (modified into a harpoon-like structure) to inject neurotoxins into its prey, which likely consists of marine worms (polychaetes) given its small size. They are capable of stinging humans, therefore live ones should be handled carefully or not at all.

== Gallery ==
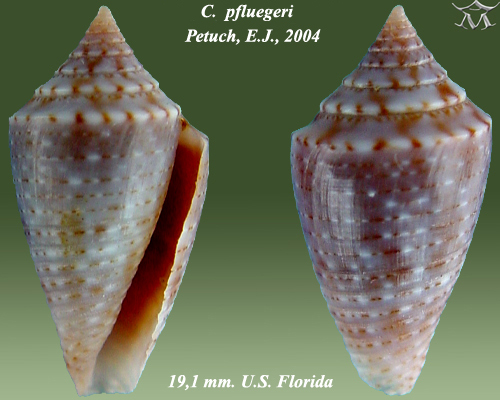
Conasprella pfluegeri (Petuch, 2003)

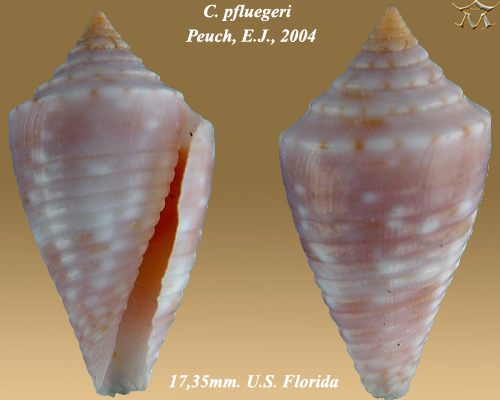
Conasprella pfluegeri (Petuch, 2003)

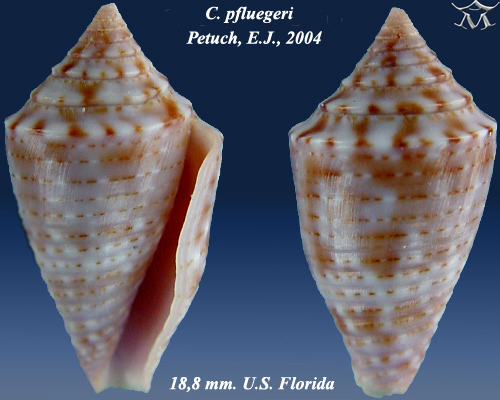
Conasprella pfluegeri (Petuch, 2003)

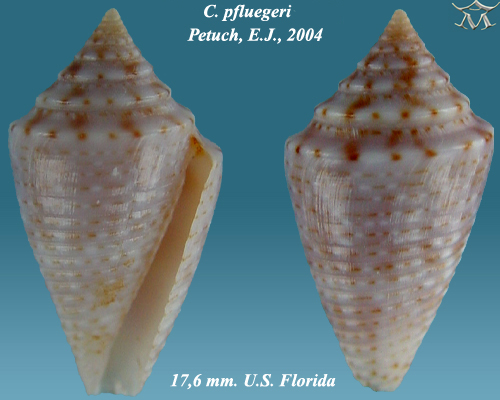
Conasprella pfluegeri (Petuch, 2003)
