= Conasprella bianchii =

Scientific classification
- Kingdom: Animalia
- Phylum: Mollusca
- Class: Gastropoda
- Subclass: Caenogastropoda
- Order: Neogastropoda
- Superfamily: Conoidea
- Family: Conidae
- Genus: Conasprella
- Species: C. bianchii

Binomial name
- Conasprella bianchii (Petuch & Berschauer, 2018)

Synonyms
- Coltroconus bianchii Petuch & Berschauer, 2018; Conasprella (Coltroconus) bianchii (Petuch & Berschauer, 2018)· accepted, alternate representation

Species of gastropod

Conasprella bianchii is a species of sea snail, a marine gastropod mollusc in the family Conidae, the cone snails, cone shells or cones.

== Distribution ==
This marine species occurs off Bahia, Brazil.
