= Conasprella subturrita =

Scientific classification
- Kingdom: Animalia
- Phylum: Mollusca
- Class: Gastropoda
- Subclass: Caenogastropoda
- Order: Neogastropoda
- Superfamily: Conoidea
- Family: Conidae
- Genus: Conasprella
- Species: C. subturrita

Binomial name
- Conasprella subturrita (d'Orbigny, 1852)

Synonyms
- † Conus (Conospira) subturritus d'Orbigny, 1852; † Conus subturritus d'Orbigny, 1852 (original combination)

Extinct species of gastropod

Conasprella subturrita is an extinct species of sea snail, a marine gastropod mollusk in the family Conidae, the cone snails, cone shells or cones.

It is only known as a fossil.

== Distribution ==
This fossil species is known from the Oligocene in France.
