= Conasprella damasomonteiroi =

Scientific classification
- Kingdom: Animalia
- Phylum: Mollusca
- Class: Gastropoda
- Subclass: Caenogastropoda
- Order: Neogastropoda
- Superfamily: Conoidea
- Family: Conidae
- Genus: Conasprella
- Species: C. damasomonteiroi

Binomial name
- Conasprella damasomonteiroi (Petuch & R. F. Myers, 2014)

Synonyms
- Conasprella (Ximeniconus) damasomonteiroi (Petuch & Myers, 2014) · accepted, alternate representation; Jaspidiconus damasomonteiroi Petuch & Myers, 2014 (original combination)

Species of gastropod

Conasprella damasomonteiroi is a species of sea snail, a marine gastropod mollusc in the family Conidae, the cone snails, cone shells or cones.

== Description ==
The height of the shell attains 24 mm. It has an orange and white patterned shell.

== Distribution ==
This species occurs in the Atlantic Ocean off Brazil.
