= Conasprella allamandi =

Scientific classification
- Kingdom: Animalia
- Phylum: Mollusca
- Class: Gastropoda
- Subclass: Caenogastropoda
- Order: Neogastropoda
- Superfamily: Conoidea
- Family: Conidae
- Genus: Conasprella
- Species: C. allamandi

Binomial name
- Conasprella allamandi (Petuch, 2013)

Synonyms
- Conasprella (Ximeniconus) allamandi (Petuch, 2013) · accepted, alternate representation; Conus allamandi (Petuch, 2013); Jaspidiconus allamandi Petuch, 2013 (original combination)

Species of gastropod

Conasprella allamandi is a species of sea snail, a marine gastropod mollusk in the family Conidae, the cone snails, cone shells or cones.

== Distribution ==
This species occurs in the Caribbean Sea off Honduras.
