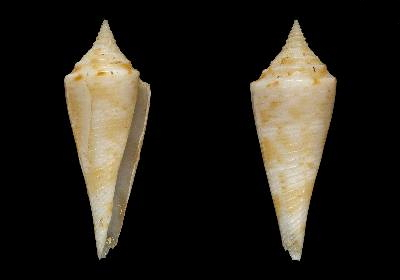
- Shell of Conasprella lemuriana (holotype in MNHN, Paris)

Scientific classification
- Kingdom: Animalia
- Phylum: Mollusca
- Class: Gastropoda
- Subclass: Caenogastropoda
- Order: Neogastropoda
- Superfamily: Conoidea
- Family: Conidae
- Genus: Conasprella
- Species: C. lemuriana

Binomial name
- Conasprella lemuriana Monnier, Tenorio, Bouchet & Puillandre, 2018

Synonyms
- Conasprella (Fusiconus) lemuriana Monnier, Tenorio, Bouchet & Puillandre, 2018· accepted, alternate representation

= Conasprella lemuriana =

Species of gastropod

Conasprella lemuriana is a species of sea snail, a marine gastropod mollusc in the family Conidae, the cone snails, cone shells or cones.

== Distribution ==
This marine species occurs in the Indian Ocean off Madagascar
