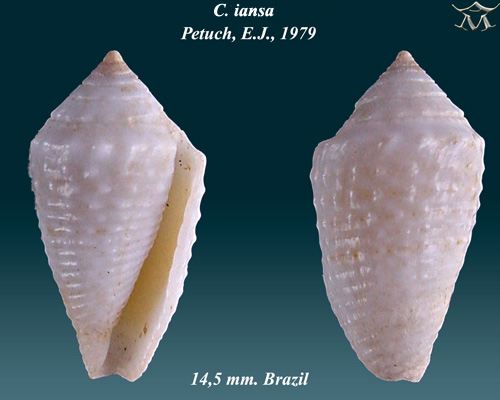
- Apertural and abapertural views of shell of Conasprella iansa (Petuch, E.J., 1979)
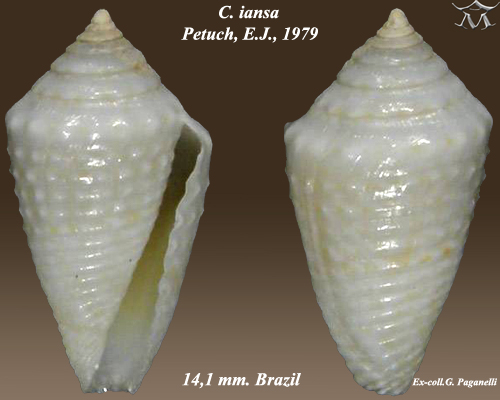

Scientific classification
- Kingdom: Animalia
- Phylum: Mollusca
- Class: Gastropoda
- Subclass: Caenogastropoda
- Order: Neogastropoda
- Superfamily: Conoidea
- Family: Conidae
- Genus: Conasprella
- Species: C. iansa

Binomial name
- Conasprella iansa (Petuch, 1979)

Synonyms
- Coltroconus bodarti (Coltro, 2004); Coltroconus delucai (Coltro, 2004); Coltroconus iansa (Petuch, 1979); Coltroconus iansa f. delucai (Coltro, 2004) (unavailable name: infrasubspecific rank); Coltroconus iansa f. schirrmeisteri (Coltro, 2004) (unavailable name: infrasubspecific rank); Coltroconus schirrmeisteri (Coltro, 2004); Conasprella (Coltroconus) iansa (Petuch, 1979) · accepted, alternate representation; Conus bodarti Coltro, 2004; Conus delucai Coltro, 2004; Conus iansa Petuch, 1979 (original combination); Conus iansa f. delucai Coltro, 2004 (unavailable name: infrasubspecific rank); Conus iansa f. schirrmeisteri Coltro, 2004 (unavailable name: infrasubspecific rank); Conus schirrmeisteri Coltro, 2004; Jaspidiconus iansa (Petuch, 1979)

= Conasprella iansa =

Species of gastropod

Conasprella iansa is a species of sea snail, a marine gastropod mollusk in the family Conidae, the cone snails and their allies.

Like all species within the genus Conasprella, these snails are predatory and venomous. They are capable of stinging humans, therefore live ones should be handled carefully or not at all.

== Description ==
The size of the shell varies between 11 mm and 16 mm.

== Distribution ==
This species occurs in the Atlantic Ocean off the Abrolhos Archipelago, Eastern Brazil.
