= Conasprella josei =

Scientific classification
- Kingdom: Animalia
- Phylum: Mollusca
- Class: Gastropoda
- Subclass: Caenogastropoda
- Order: Neogastropoda
- Superfamily: Conoidea
- Family: Conidae
- Genus: Conasprella
- Species: C. josei

Binomial name
- Conasprella josei (Petuch & Berschauer, 2016)

Synonyms
- Jaspidiconus josei Petuch & Berschauer, 2016 (original combination)

Species of gastropod

Conasprella josei is a species of sea snail, a marine gastropod mollusc in the family Conidae, the cone snails, cone shells or cones.

== Description ==
Shell size 20 mm.

== Distribution ==
This marine species occurs in the Atlantic Ocean off Bahia, Brazil.
