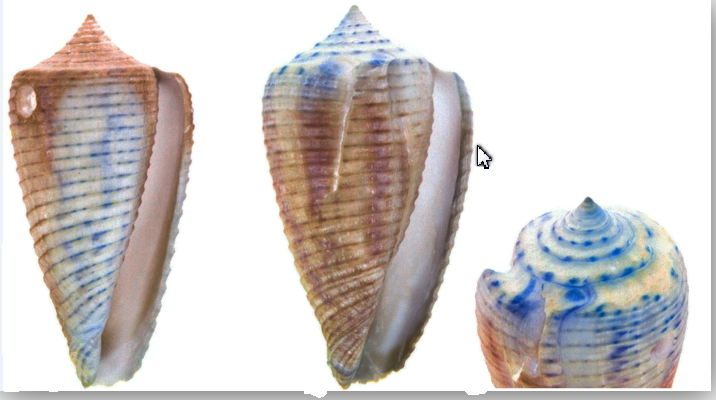
- Three views of a shell of Conasprella kitteredgei

Scientific classification
- Domain: Eukaryota
- Kingdom: Animalia
- Phylum: Mollusca
- Class: Gastropoda
- Subclass: Caenogastropoda
- Order: Neogastropoda
- Superfamily: Conoidea
- Family: Conidae
- Genus: Conasprella
- Species: C. kitteredgei

Binomial name
- Conasprella kitteredgei (Maury, 1917)

Synonyms
- † Conasprella (Ximenoconus) kitteredgei (Maury,1917) accepted, alternate representation; † Conus kitteredgei Maury, 1917 (original combination); † Perplexiconus kitteredgei (Maury), Tucker and Tenorio, 2009

= Conasprella kitteredgei =

Species of gastropod

Conasprella kitteredgei is a species of fossil sea snail, a marine gastropod mollusk in the family Conidae, the cone snails, cone shells or cones.

== Distribution ==
This fossil species is known from the Neogene of the Dominican Republic.
