= Conasprella gubernatrix =

Scientific classification
- Kingdom: Animalia
- Phylum: Mollusca
- Class: Gastropoda
- Subclass: Caenogastropoda
- Order: Neogastropoda
- Superfamily: Conoidea
- Family: Conidae
- Genus: Conasprella
- Species: C. gubernatrix

Binomial name
- Conasprella gubernatrix (Petuch & Berschauer, 2018)

Synonyms
- Conasprella (Ximeniconus) gubernatrix (Petuch & Berschauer, 2018)· accepted, alternate representation; Ximeniconus gubernatrix Petuch & Berschauer, 2018 (original combination)

Species of gastropod

Conasprella gubernatrix is a species of sea snail, a marine gastropod mollusc in the family Conidae, the cone snails, cone shells or cones.

== Distribution ==
This marine species occurs in the Pacific Ocean off Panama.
