= Conasprella minutissima =

Scientific classification
- Kingdom: Animalia
- Phylum: Mollusca
- Class: Gastropoda
- Subclass: Caenogastropoda
- Order: Neogastropoda
- Superfamily: Conoidea
- Family: Conidae
- Genus: Conasprella
- Species: C. minutissima

Binomial name
- Conasprella minutissima Harzhauser & Landau, 2016

Extinct species of gastropod

Conasprella minutissima is an extinct species of sea snail, a marine gastropod mollusk in the family Conidae, the cone snails and their allies.

== Distribution ==
This species occurs in the following locations:

Austria
