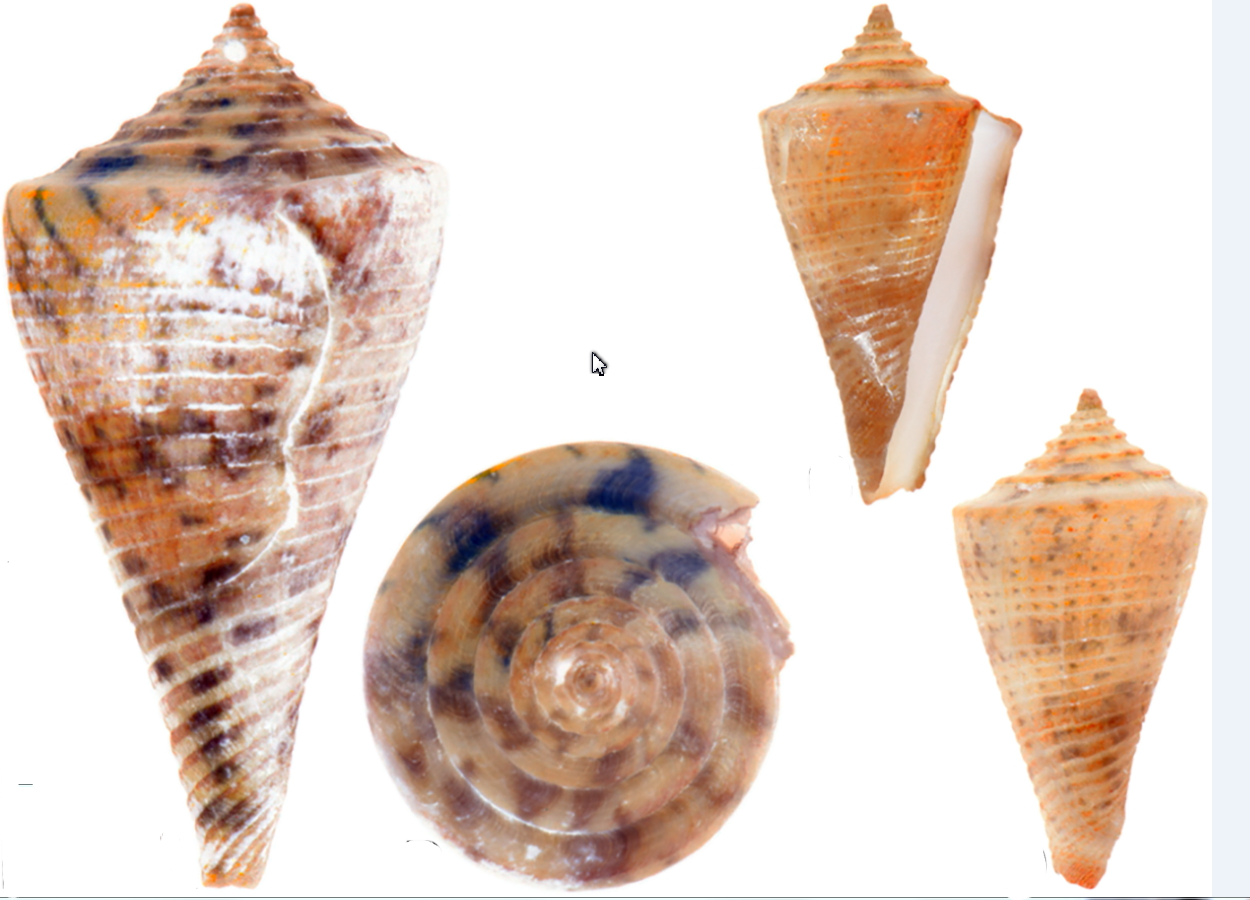
- Four views of a shell of Conasprella stenostoma (reversed images of specimens photographed under UV-light)

Scientific classification
- Kingdom: Animalia
- Phylum: Mollusca
- Class: Gastropoda
- Subclass: Caenogastropoda
- Order: Neogastropoda
- Superfamily: Conoidea
- Family: Conidae
- Genus: Conasprella
- Species: C. stenostoma

Binomial name
- Conasprella stenostoma Sowerby, 1850

Synonyms
- † Conus stenostoma G. B. Sowerby I, 1850 † (original combination); † Conus stenostomus Sowerby I, Maury, 1917; † Kohniconus stenostoma (Sowerby I), Tucker and Tenorio, 2009

= Conasprella stenostoma =

Species of gastropod

Conasprella stenostoma is a species of sea snail, a marine gastropod mollusk in the family Conidae, the cone snails, cone shells or cones.

It is only known as a fossil.

== Distribution ==
This fossil species is known from the Neogene of the Dominican Republic.
