= Conasprella coriolisi =

Scientific classification
- Kingdom: Animalia
- Phylum: Mollusca
- Class: Gastropoda
- Subclass: Caenogastropoda
- Order: Neogastropoda
- Superfamily: Conoidea
- Family: Conidae
- Genus: Conasprella
- Species: C. coriolisi

Binomial name
- Conasprella coriolisi (Röckel, Richard & Moolenbeek, 1995)

Synonyms
- Bathyconus coriolisi (Röckel, Richard & Moolenbeek, 1995); Conasprella (Fusiconus) coriolisi (Röckel, Richard & Moolenbeek, 1995) · accepted, alternate representation; Conus coriolisi Röckel, Richard & Moolenbeek, 1995; Conus orbignyi coriolisi Röckel, Richard & Moolenbeek, 1995 (basionym)

Species of gastropod

Conasprella coriolisi is a species of sea snail, a marine gastropod mollusk in the family Conidae, the cone snails and their allies.

Like all species within the genus Conasprella, these snails are predatory and venomous. They are capable of stinging humans, therefore live ones should be handled carefully or not at all.

== Description ==
The size of the shell varies between 40 mm and 53 mm.

== Distribution ==
This marine species occurs off New Caledonia, Vanuatu and in the Coral Sea at depths between 150 m and 550 m.
