= Conasprella aquitanica =

Scientific classification
- Domain: Eukaryota
- Kingdom: Animalia
- Phylum: Mollusca
- Class: Gastropoda
- Subclass: Caenogastropoda
- Order: Neogastropoda
- Superfamily: Conoidea
- Family: Conidae
- Genus: Conasprella
- Species: C. aquitanica

Binomial name
- Conasprella aquitanica (Mayer, 1858)

Synonyms
- † Conus aquitanicus Mayer, 1858

Extinct species of gastropod

Conasprella aquitanica is an extinct species of sea snail, a marine gastropod mollusk in the family Conidae, the cone snails and their allies.

== Distribution ==
Fossils of this marine species were found in Oligocene strata in Southwest France.
