= Conasprella simonei =

Scientific classification
- Kingdom: Animalia
- Phylum: Mollusca
- Class: Gastropoda
- Subclass: Caenogastropoda
- Order: Neogastropoda
- Superfamily: Conoidea
- Family: Conidae
- Genus: Conasprella
- Species: C. simonei

Binomial name
- Conasprella simonei (Petuch & R. F. Myers, 2014)

Synonyms
- Conasprella (Ximeniconus) simonei (Petuch & R. F. Myers, 2014) · accepted, alternate representation; Conus simonei (Petuch & R. F. Myers, 2014); Jaspidiconus simonei Petuch & R. F. Myers, 2014 (original combination)

Species of gastropod

Conasprella simonei is a species of sea snail, a marine gastropod mollusk in the family Conidae, the cone snails, cone shells or cones.

Like all species within the genus Conasprella, these cone snails are predatory and venomous. They are capable of stinging humans, therefore live ones should be handled carefully or not at all.

== Description ==
The size of the shell attains 27 mm.

== Distribution ==
This species occurs in the Atlantic Ocean off Brazil.
