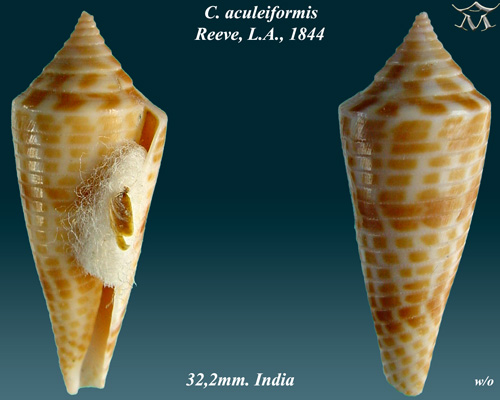
- Apertural and abapertural views of shell of Conasprella aculeiformis Reeve, L.A., 1844
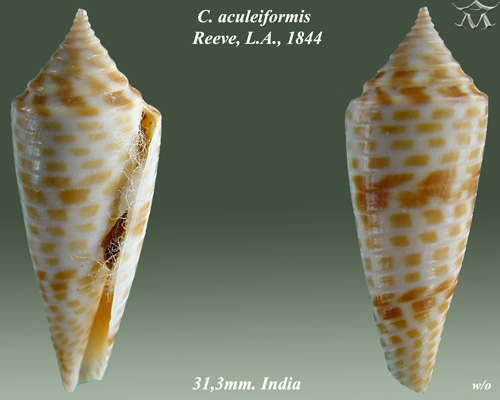

Conservation status
- Data Deficient (IUCN 3.1)

Scientific classification
- Kingdom: Animalia
- Phylum: Mollusca
- Class: Gastropoda
- Subclass: Caenogastropoda
- Order: Neogastropoda
- Superfamily: Conoidea
- Family: Conidae
- Genus: Conasprella
- Species: C. aculeiformis

Binomial name
- Conasprella aculeiformis (Reeve, 1844)

Synonyms
- Bathyconus aculeiformis (Reeve, 1844); Conasprella (Fusiconus) aculeiformis (Reeve, 1844) · accepted, alternate representation; Conus aculeiformis Reeve, 1844 (original combination); Conus delicatus Schepman, 1913

= Conasprella aculeiformis =

Species of gastropod

Conasprella aculeiformis, common name the spindle cone, is a species of sea snail, a marine gastropod mollusk in the family Conidae, the cone snails and their allies.

Like all species within the genus Conasprella, these snails are predatory and venomous. They are capable of stinging humans, therefore live ones should be handled carefully or not at all.

== Description ==
The narrow shell has an elevated spire. The length of the shell varies between 27 mm and 54 mm. It is encircled with equidistant punctate grooves, and flat interspaces. The color of the shell is white, with light chestnut spots and two interrupted broad bands of chestnut cloudings.

== Distribution ==
This marine species occurs in the Red Sea, the Persian Gulf; off Southeast India, the Philippines and off Southern Indonesia
