= Conasprella traceyi =

Scientific classification
- Kingdom: Animalia
- Phylum: Mollusca
- Class: Gastropoda
- Subclass: Caenogastropoda
- Order: Neogastropoda
- Superfamily: Conoidea
- Family: Conidae
- Genus: Conasprella
- Species: C. traceyi

Binomial name
- Conasprella traceyi (Tucker & Stahlschmidt, 2010)

Synonyms
- Conasprella (Pseudoconorbis) traceyi (Tucker & Stahlschmidt, 2010) · accepted, alternate representation; Pseudoconorbis traceyi Tucker & Stahlschmidt, 2010 (original combination)

Species of gastropod

Conasprella traceyi is a species of sea snail, a marine gastropod mollusk in the family Conidae, the cone snails and their allies.

Like all species within the genus Conasprella, these cone snails are predatory and venomous. They are capable of stinging humans, therefore live ones should be handled carefully or not at all.

== Description ==
The size of the shell attains 37 mm.

== Distribution ==
This marine species occurs off Southeast India.
