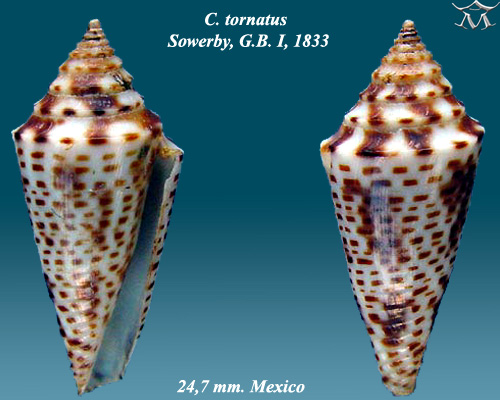
- Apertural and abapertural views of shell of Conasprella tornata (Sowerby, G.B. I, 1833)

Scientific classification
- Kingdom: Animalia
- Phylum: Mollusca
- Class: Gastropoda
- Subclass: Caenogastropoda
- Order: Neogastropoda
- Superfamily: Conoidea
- Family: Conidae
- Genus: Conasprella
- Species: C. tornata

Binomial name
- Conasprella tornata G. B. Sowerby I, 1833

Synonyms
- Conasprella (Ximeniconus) tornata (G. B. Sowerby I, 1833) · accepted, alternate representation; Conus tornatus G. B. Sowerby I, 1833 (original combination); Globiconus tornatus (G. B. Sowerby I, 1833)

= Conasprella tornata =

Species of gastropod

Conasprella tornata, common name the grooved cone, is a species of sea snail, a marine gastropod mollusk in the family Conidae, the cone snails and their allies.

Like all species within the genus Conasprella, these snails are predatory and venomous. They are capable of stinging humans, therefore live ones should be handled carefully or not at all.

== Description ==
The length is usually between 15 and 40 mm. The body whorl is narrowly elongated conical in shape. The spire is elevated and scalariform, conical in profile. The protoconch is multispiral. Color pattern is variable but rather simple.

== Distribution ==
This marine species occurs off Islas Cedros, Baja California to mid-Gulf of California, Mexico; and south to Peru.
