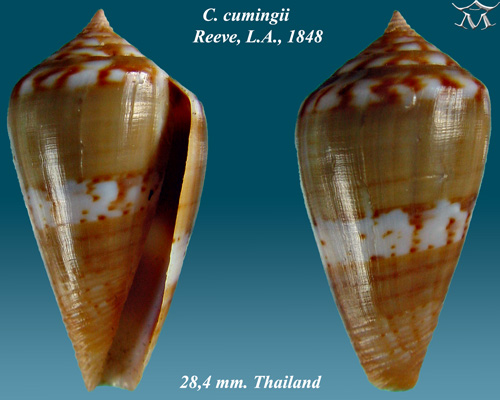
- Apertural and abapertural views of shell of Conus cumingii (Reeve, L.A., 1848)

Scientific classification
- Kingdom: Animalia
- Phylum: Mollusca
- Class: Gastropoda
- Subclass: Caenogastropoda
- Order: Neogastropoda
- Family: Conidae
- Genus: Conus
- Subgenus: Rhizoconus; Mörch, 1852

Type species
- Conus miles Linnaeus, 1758

Synonyms
- Leptoconus (Rhizoconus) Mörch, 1852; Rhizoconus Mörch, 1852

= Conus (Rhizoconus) =

Subgenus of gastropods

Rhizoconus is a subgenus of sea snails, marine gastropod mollusks in the genus Conus, family Conidae, the cone snails and their allies.

In the latest classification of the family Conidae by Puillandre N., Duda T.F., Meyer C., Olivera B.M. & Bouchet P. (2015), Rhizoconus has become a subgenus of Conus as Conus (Rhizoconus) Mörch, 1852 (type species: Conus miles Linnaeus, 1758 ) represented as Conus Linnaeus, 1758.

== Species ==
- Rhizoconus alisi (Moolenbeek, Röckel & Richard, 1995) represented as Conasprella alisi Moolenbeek, Röckel & Richard, 1995 (alternate representation)
- Rhizoconus anosyensis (Bozzetti, 2008): synonym of Conus (Rhizoconus) anosyensis Bozzetti, 2008 represented as Conus anosyensis Bozzetti, 2008
- Rhizoconus ardisiaceus (Kiener, 1845) represented as Conus ardisiaceus Kiener, 1845 (alternate representation)
- Rhizoconus capitaneus (Linnaeus, 1758) represented as Conus capitaneus Linnaeus, 1758 (alternate representation)
- Rhizoconus cumingii (Reeve, 1848) represented as Conus cumingii Reeve, 1848 (alternate representation)
- Rhizoconus fumigatus (Hwass in Bruguière, 1792) represented as Conus fumigatus Hwass in Bruguière, 1792 (alternate representation)
- Rhizoconus hyaena (Hwass in Bruguière, 1792) represented as Conus hyaena Hwass in Bruguière, 1792 (alternate representation)
- Rhizoconus miles (Linnaeus, 1758) represented as Conus miles Linnaeus, 1758 (alternate representation)
- Rhizoconus mustelinus (Hwass in Bruguière, 1792) represented as Conus mustelinus Hwass in Bruguière, 1792 (alternate representation)
- Rhizoconus namocanus (Hwass in Bruguière, 1792) represented as Conus namocanus Hwass in Bruguière, 1792 (alternate representation)
- Rhizoconus peli (Moolenbeek, 1996) represented as Conus peli Moolenbeek, 1996 (alternate representation)
- Rhizoconus pertusus (Hwass in Bruguière, 1792) represented as Conus pertusus Hwass in Bruguière, 1792 (alternate representation)
- Rhizoconus rattus (Hwass in Bruguière, 1792) represented as Conus rattus Hwass in Bruguière, 1792 (alternate representation)
- Rhizoconus rawaiensis (da Motta, 1978) represented as Conus rawaiensis da Motta, 1978 (alternate representation)
- Rhizoconus tirardi (Röckel & Moolenbeek, 1996) represented as Conus tirardi Röckel & Moolenbeek, 1996 (alternate representation)
- Rhizoconus vexillum (Gmelin, 1791) represented as Conus vexillum Gmelin, 1791 (alternate representation)
- Rhizoconus wilsi (Delsaerdt, 1998) represented as Conus wilsi Delsaerdt, 1998 (alternate representation)

The following species were brought into synonymy:

- Rhizoconus advertex Garrard, 1961: synonym of Conus advertex (Garrard, 1961)
- Rhizoconus hirasei Kuroda, 1956: synonym of Conus hirasei (Kuroda, 1956)
- Rhizoconus kiicumulus Azuma, 1982: synonym of Conus kiicumulus (Azuma, 1982)
- Rhizoconus kimioi Habe, 1965: synonym of Conasprella kimioi (Habe, 1965)
- Rhizoconus klemae Cotton, 1953: synonym of Conus klemae (Cotton, 1953)
- Rhizoconus nebulosus Azuma, 1973: synonym of Conus kiicumulus (Azuma, 1982)
- Rhizoconus paradiseus Shikama, T., 1977: synonym of Conus barthelemyi Bernardi, 1861
- Rhizoconus yoshioi Azuma, 1973: synonym of Conus sazanka Shikama, 1970
