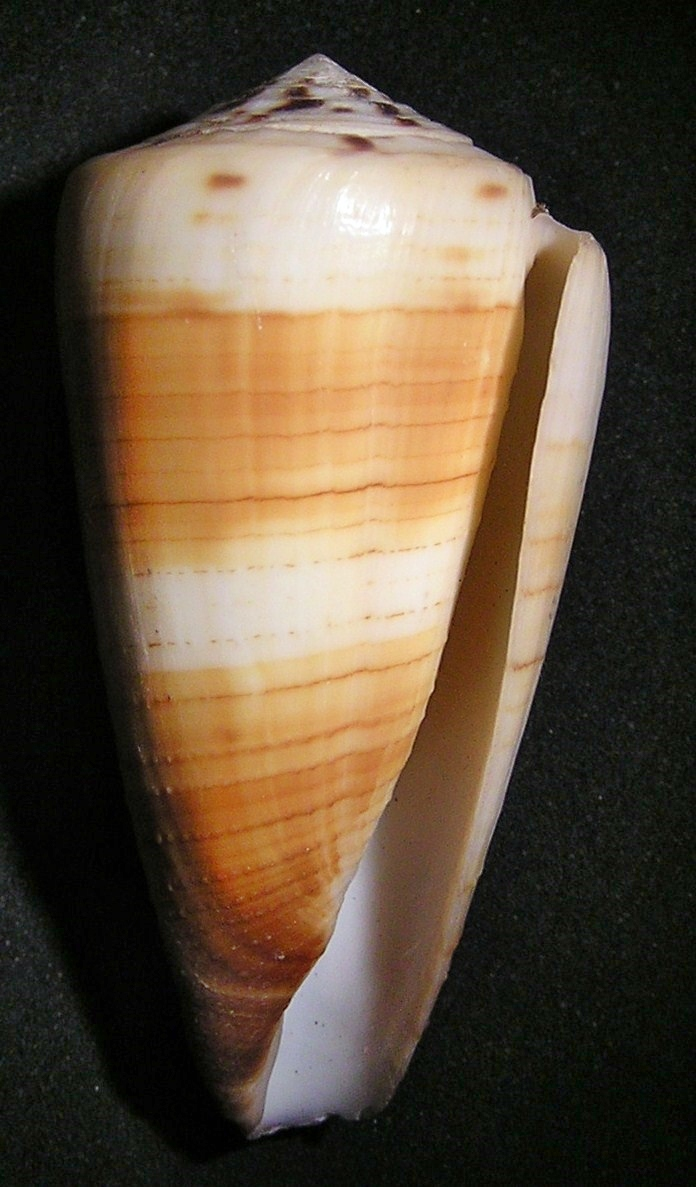
- Apertural view of Conus ferrugineus

Conservation status
- Least Concern (IUCN 3.1)

Scientific classification
- Kingdom: Animalia
- Phylum: Mollusca
- Class: Gastropoda
- Subclass: Caenogastropoda
- Order: Neogastropoda
- Superfamily: Conoidea
- Family: Conidae
- Genus: Conus
- Species: C. ferrugineus

Binomial name
- Conus ferrugineus Hwass in Bruguière, 1792

Synonyms
- Conus (Strategoconus) ferrugineus Hwass in Bruguière, 1792 accepted, alternate representation; Conus chenui Crosse, 1857; Conus loebbeckeanus Weinkauff, 1873; Conus mirmillo Crosse, 1865; Conus sophiae Brazier, 1875; Vituliconus ferrugineus Hwass in Bruguière, 1792

= Conus ferrugineus =

Species of sea snail

Conus ferrugineus is a species of sea snail, a marine gastropod mollusk in the family Conidae, the cone snails and their allies.

Like all species within the genus Conus, these snails are predatory and venomous. They are capable of stinging humans, therefore live ones should be handled carefully or not at all.

== Description ==
The size of an adult shell varies between 40 mm and 93 mm. The thin shell has a depressed carinate and striate spire, which is yellowish, maculated with brown. The body whorl is striated below, yellowish, with two series of longitudinal forked and irregular dark brown markings, interrupted in the middle and at the base. There are traces of distant narrow brown revolving lines. The aperture is white.

Colour of the living mollusc is a bright lemon-yellow.

== Distribution ==
This species occurs in the Pacific Ocean from Indonesia to the Marquesas islands, off Australia (Queensland, the Northern Territory and Western Australia) and New Caledonia.

== Gallery ==
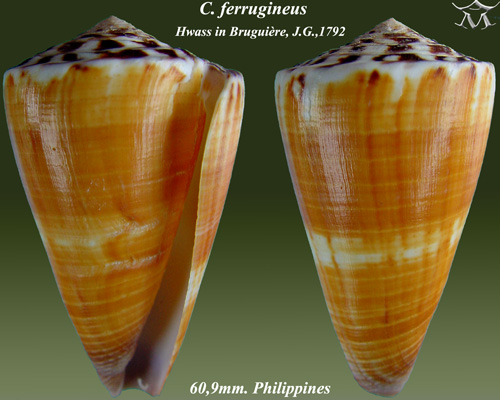
Conus ferrugineus Hwass in Bruguière, J.G., 1792

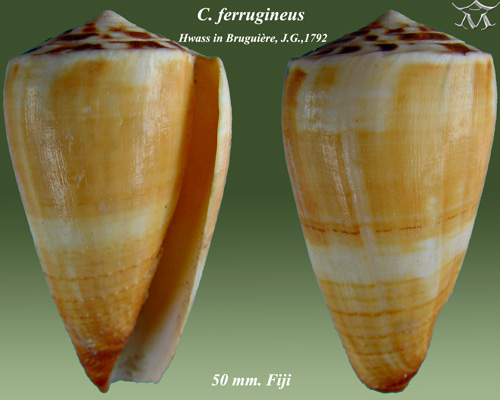
Conus ferrugineus Hwass in Bruguière, J.G., 1792

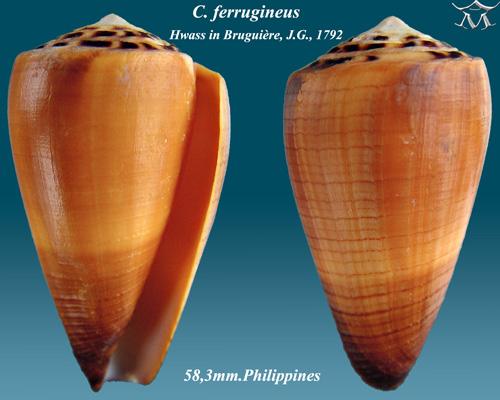
Conus ferrugineus Hwass in Bruguière, J.G., 1792
