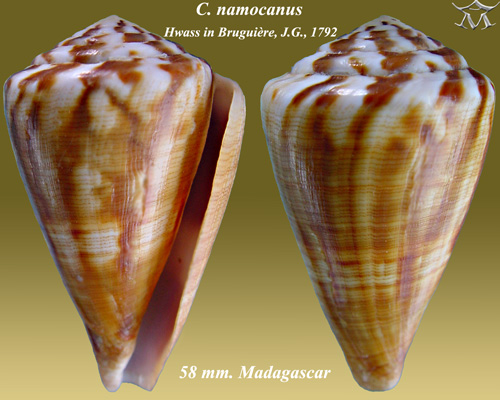
- Two views of a shell of Conus namocanus

Conservation status
- Least Concern (IUCN 3.1)

Scientific classification
- Kingdom: Animalia
- Phylum: Mollusca
- Class: Gastropoda
- Subclass: Caenogastropoda
- Order: Neogastropoda
- Superfamily: Conoidea
- Family: Conidae
- Genus: Conus
- Species: C. namocanus

Binomial name
- Conus namocanus Hwass in Bruguière, 1792

Synonyms
- Conus (Rhizoconus) namocanus Hwass in Bruguière, 1792 · accepted, alternate representation; Conus badius Kiener, 1845; Conus laevigatus G. B. Sowerby II, 1858; Conus nemocanus Hwass in Bruguière, 1792 (misspelling); Rhizoconus namocanus (Hwass in Bruguière, 1792)

= Conus namocanus =

Species of sea snail

Conus namocanus, common name the Namocanus cone, is a species of sea snail, a marine gastropod mollusk in the family Conidae, the cone snails and their allies.

Like all species within the genus Conus, these snails are predatory and venomous. They are capable of stinging humans, therefore live ones should be handled carefully or not at all.

== Description ==
The size of the shell varies between 40 mm and 100 mm. The spire is usually somewhat convex and striate. The color is white, broadly flamed with chocolate. The body whorl is white or yellowish brown, with irregular chocolate longitudinal striations. The shell is partially interrupted so as to form a central white band. The longitudinal markings are less defined and broader, than in Conus vexillum Gmelin, 1791 to which it resembles. They give a darker shade to the shell.

== Distribution ==
This species occurs in the Red Sea and off Oman; in the Indian Ocean off Madagascar, Tanzania and South Africa.
