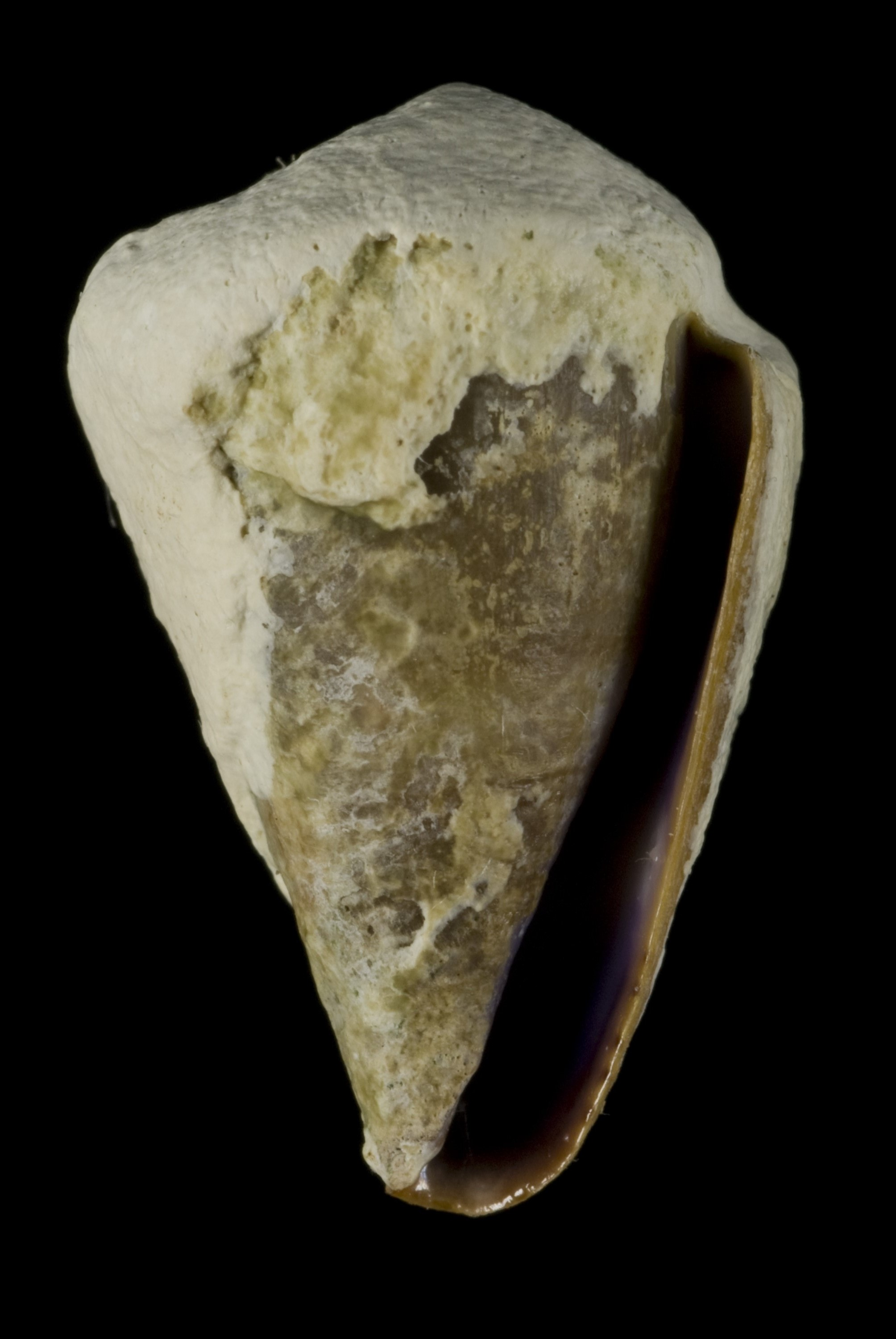
- Shell of Conus taitensis (specimen at MNHN, Paris)

Scientific classification
- Kingdom: Animalia
- Phylum: Mollusca
- Class: Gastropoda
- Subclass: Caenogastropoda
- Order: Neogastropoda
- Superfamily: Conoidea
- Family: Conidae
- Genus: Conus
- Species: C. taitensis

Binomial name
- Conus taitensis Hwass in Bruguière, 1792

Synonyms
- Conus (Rhizoconus) taitensis Hwass in Bruguière, 1792; Rhizoconus taitensis (Hwass in Bruguière, 1792)

= Conus taitensis =

Species of sea snail

Conus taitensis is a species of sea snail, a marine gastropod mollusk, in the family Conidae, the cone snails and their allies.

== Distribution ==
This marine species occurs in the South Pacific off the Marquesas Islands.
