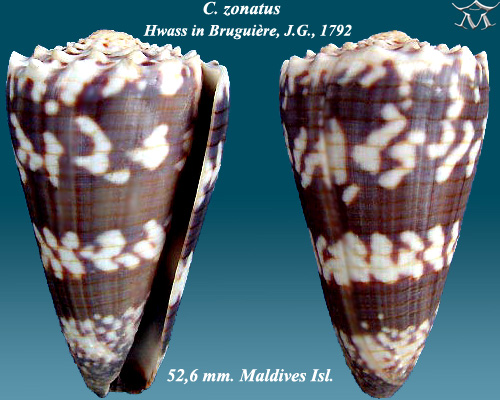
- Apertural and abapertural views of shell of Conus zonatus Hwass in Bruguière, J.G., 1792
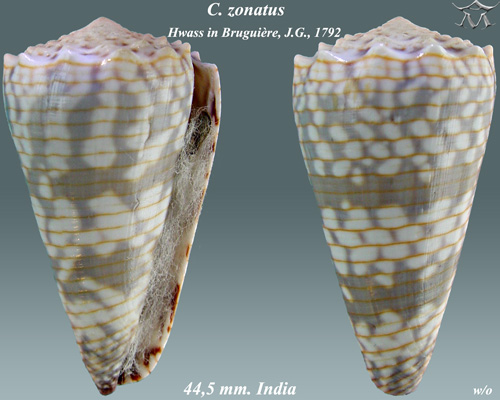

Scientific classification
- Kingdom: Animalia
- Phylum: Mollusca
- Class: Gastropoda
- Subclass: Caenogastropoda
- Order: Neogastropoda
- Superfamily: Conoidea
- Family: Conidae
- Genus: Conus
- Species: C. zonatus

Binomial name
- Conus zonatus Hwass in Bruguière, 1792

Synonyms
- Conus (Stephanoconus) zonatus Hwass in Bruguière, 1792 · accepted, alternate representation; Conus edwardi Preston, 1908; Conus lapideus Holten, 1802; Conus (Conus) nubifer Lamarck, J.B.P.A. de, 1810; Cucullus turritus Röding, 1798; Rhombiconus zonatus (Hwass in Bruguière, 1792)

= Conus zonatus =

Species of sea snail

Conus zonatus, common name the zoned cone, is a species of sea snail, a marine gastropod mollusk in the family Conidae, the cone snails and their allies.

Like all species within the genus Conus, these snails are predatory and venomous. They are capable of stinging humans, therefore live ones should be handled carefully or not at all.

== Description ==
The size of the shell varies between 35 mm and 88 mm. The ground color of the shell is purple ash, with narrow chestnut revolving lines and white spots, the latter frequently irregularly coalescing.

== Distribution ==
This marine species occurs off the Seychelles, in the Mascarene Bassin, and off India, Thailand and Sumatra.
