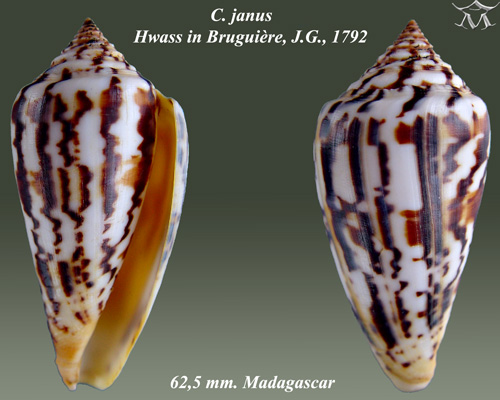
- Apertural and abapertural views of shell of Conus janus Hwass in Bruguière, J.G., 1792

Scientific classification
- Kingdom: Animalia
- Phylum: Mollusca
- Class: Gastropoda
- Subclass: Caenogastropoda
- Order: Neogastropoda
- Superfamily: Conoidea
- Family: Conidae
- Genus: Conus
- Species: C. janus

Binomial name
- Conus janus Hwass in Bruguière, 1792

Synonyms
- Asprella janus (Hwass in Bruguière, 1792); Conus latifasciatus G. B. Sowerby II, 1858; Conus (Phasmoconus) janus Hwass in Bruguière, 1792 · accepted, alternate representation; Graphiconus janus (Hwass in Bruguière, 1792)

= Conus janus =

Species of sea snail

Conus janus, common name the janus cone, is a species of sea snail, a marine gastropod mollusk in the family Conidae, the cone snails and their allies.

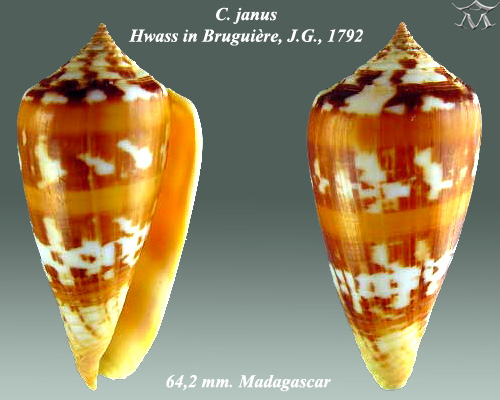
Conus janus Hwass in Bruguière, J.G., 1792

Like all species within the genus Conus, these snails are predatory and venomous. They can sting humans if handled.

== Description ==
The size of the shell varies between 37 mm and 80 mm. The maculated spire is concavely elevated and striate. The narrow body whorl narrow has a rounded shoulder, and is distantly sulcate below. The shell is whitish or yellowish, indistinctly three-banded by yellowish brown or chestnut longitudinal markings.

== Distribution ==
This marine species occurs in the Mascarene Basin; off Southeast India and the Philippines.
