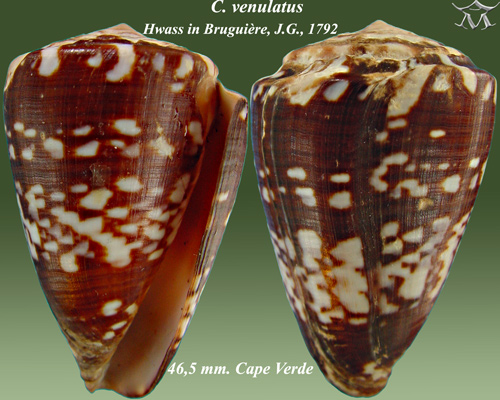
- Apertural and abapertural views of shell of Conus venulatus Hwass in Bruguière, J.G., 1792
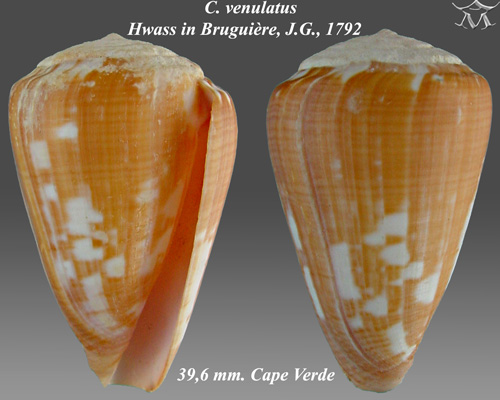

Conservation status
- Least Concern (IUCN 3.1)

Scientific classification
- Kingdom: Animalia
- Phylum: Mollusca
- Class: Gastropoda
- Subclass: Caenogastropoda
- Order: Neogastropoda
- Superfamily: Conoidea
- Family: Conidae
- Genus: Conus
- Species: C. venulatus

Binomial name
- Conus venulatus Hwass in Bruguière, 1792

Synonyms
- Conus (Kalloconus) venulatus Hwass in Bruguière, 1792 · accepted, alternate representation; Conus nivifer G. B. Sowerby I, 1833; Conus nivosus Lamarck, 1810; Conus quaestor Lamarck, 1810; Kalloconus (Trovaoconus) josefiadeiroi Cossignani & Fiadeiro, 2019 (basionym); Kalloconus (Trovaoconus) venulatus (Hwass in Bruguière, 1792); Kalloconus josefiadeiroi Cossignani & Fiadeiro, 2019; Kalloconus venulatus (Hwass in Bruguière, 1792); Trovaoconus venulatus (Hwass in Bruguière, 1792)

= Conus venulatus =

Species of sea snail

Conus venulatus, common name the Cape Verde cone, is a species of sea snail, a marine gastropod mollusk in the family Conidae, the cone snails and their allies.

Like all species within the genus Conus, these snails are predatory and venomous. They are capable of stinging humans, therefore live ones should be handled carefully or not at all.

== Description ==
The size of the shell varies between 27 mm and 55 mm. The color of the shell varies from light chestnut to dark chocolate, with indistinct darker revolving lines, irregularly marbled throughout with white. The spire and lower part of the body whorl are striate.

== Distribution ==
This species occurs in the Atlantic Ocean off the Cape Verde Islands.

== Gallery ==
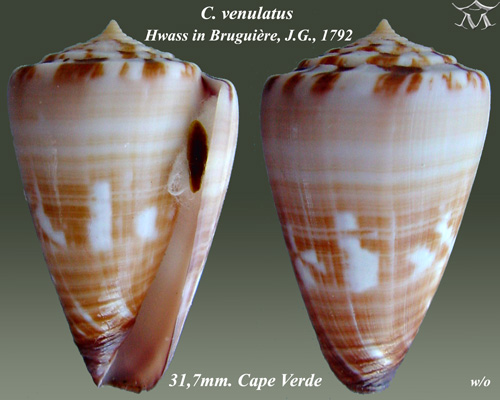
Conus venulatus Hwass in Bruguière, J.G., 1792
