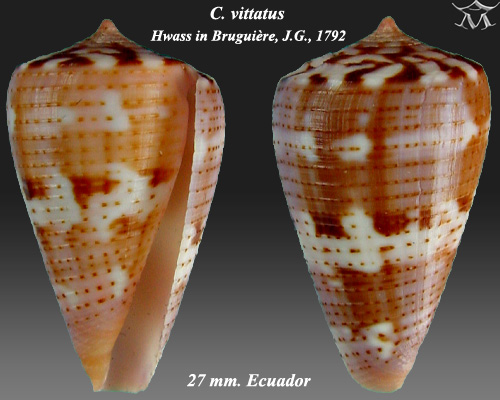
- Apertural and abapertural views of shell of Conus vittatus Hwass in Bruguière, J.G., 1792
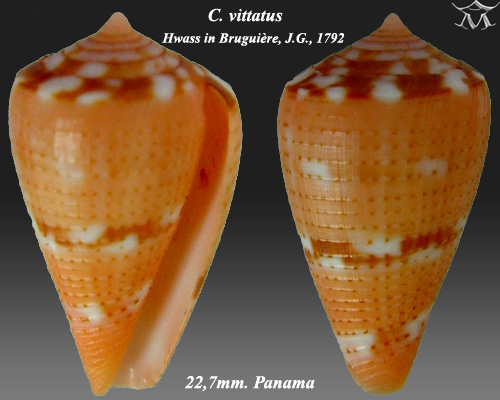

Conservation status
- Least Concern (IUCN 3.1)

Scientific classification
- Kingdom: Animalia
- Phylum: Mollusca
- Class: Gastropoda
- Subclass: Caenogastropoda
- Order: Neogastropoda
- Superfamily: Conoidea
- Family: Conidae
- Genus: Conus
- Species: C. vittatus

Binomial name
- Conus vittatus Hwass in Bruguière, 1792

Synonyms
- Conus (Dauciconus) vittatus Hwass in Bruguière, 1792 · accepted, alternate representation; Conus reevei Kiener, 1845; Poremskiconus vittatus (Hwass in Bruguière, 1792); Purpuriconus vittatus (Hwass in Bruguière, 1792)

= Conus vittatus =

Species of sea snail

Conus vittatus, common name the ribboned cone, is a species of sea snail. It is a marine gastropod mollusk in the family Conidae, the cone snails and their allies.

Like all species within the genus Conus, these snails are predatory and venomous. They are capable of stinging humans, therefore live ones should be handled carefully or not at all.

== Description ==
The size of the shell varies between 22 and 50 mm (0.87 and 1.97 in). The color of the shell is pink-brown, maculated or strigated longitudinally with light chestnut, with chestnut-dotted revolving striae, and a ceritall white, chestnut maculated band. The convex spire is maculated with chestnut.

== Distribution ==
This marine species occurs in the Gulf of California, Western Mexico to the Pacific Ocean off Ecuador.

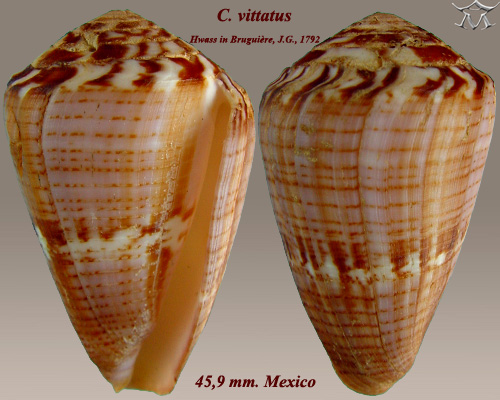
Conus vittatus Hwass in Bruguière, J.G., 1792

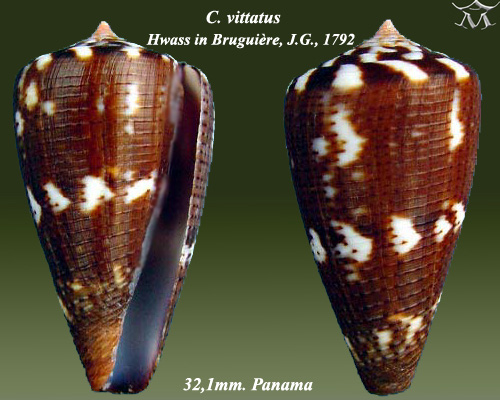
Conus vittatus Hwass in Bruguière, J.G., 1792
