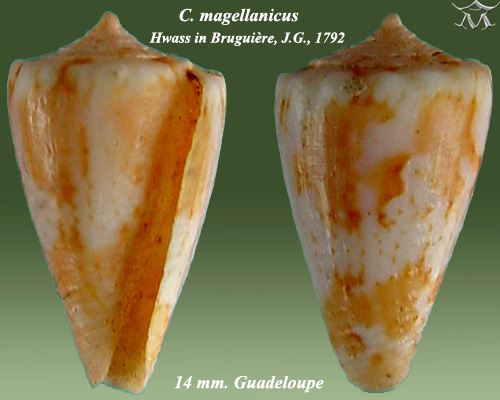
- Apertural and abapertural views of shell of Conus magellanicus Hwass in Bruguière, J.G., 1792

Scientific classification
- Kingdom: Animalia
- Phylum: Mollusca
- Class: Gastropoda
- Subclass: Caenogastropoda
- Order: Neogastropoda
- Superfamily: Conoidea
- Family: Conidae
- Genus: Conus
- Species: C. magellanicus

Binomial name
- Conus magellanicus Hwass in Bruguière, 1792

Synonyms
- Conus (Dauciconus) magellanicus Hwass in Bruguière, 1792 · accepted, alternate representation; Conus cidaris Kiener, 1845; Conus ornatus G. B. Sowerby I, 1833 (junior secondary homonym of Cucullus ornatus Röding, 1798); Conus speciosissimus Reeve, 1848; Magelliconus magellanicus (Hwass in Bruguière, 1792); Purpuriconus magellanicus (Hwass in Bruguière, 1792)

= Conus magellanicus =

Species of sea snail

Conus magellanicus is a species of sea snails, marine gastropod molluscs in the family Conidae, the cone snails and their allies.

Like all species within the genus Conus, these snails are predatory and venomous. They are capable of stinging humans, therefore live ones should be handled carefully or not at all.

== Distribution ==
This species occurs in the Caribbean Sea off Panama, Mexico, Guadeloupe and Martinique.

== Description ==
The maximum recorded shell length is 26 mm. The smooth shell shows distant revolving striae, the upper ones nearly obsolete. The spire is concavely depressed with a raised pink apex and is somewhat tuberculate. Its color is yellowish with a band of irregular white blotches dotted and shaded with chestnut in the center, and smaller ones at the upper part and base.

== Habitat ==
Minimum recorded depth is 0 m. Maximum recorded depth is 26 m.
