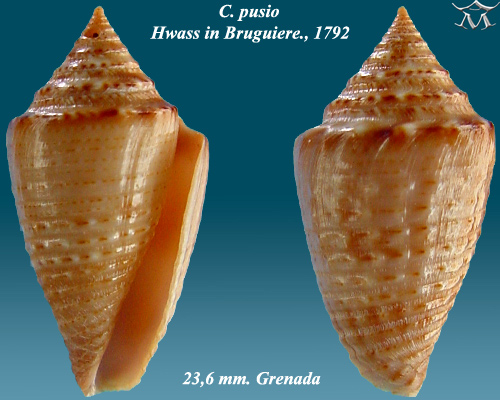
- Apertural and abapertural views of shell of Conasprella pusio Hwass in Bruguiere., 1792
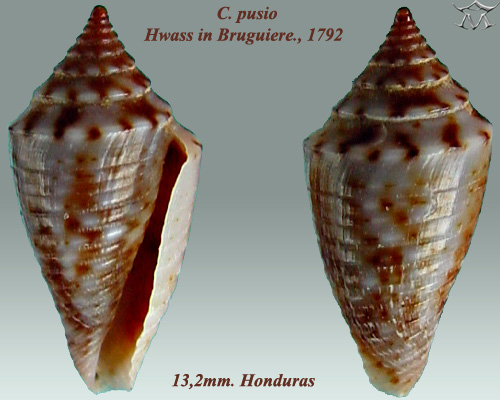

Scientific classification
- Kingdom: Animalia
- Phylum: Mollusca
- Class: Gastropoda
- Subclass: Caenogastropoda
- Order: Neogastropoda
- Superfamily: Conoidea
- Family: Conidae
- Genus: Conasprella
- Species: C. pusio

Binomial name
- Conasprella pusio Hwass in Bruguière, 1792

Synonyms
- Conasprella (Ximeniconus) pusio (Hwass in Bruguière, 1792) · accepted, alternate representation; Conus boubeeae G. B. Sowerby III, 1903; Conus duvali Bernardi, 1862; Conus minutus Reeve, 1844 (invalid: junior homonym of Conus minutus Schröter, 1803); Conus pusillus Lamarck, 1810; Conus pusio Hwass in Bruguière, 1792 (original combination); Jaspidiconus pusio (Hwass in Bruguière, 1792); Kermasprella pusillus "Chemnitz, J.H." Lamarck, J.B.P.A. de, 1810; Leptoconus duvali Bernardi, M., 1862

= Conasprella pusio =

Species of sea snail

Conus pusio is a species of sea snail, a marine gastropod mollusk in the family Conidae, the cone snails and their allies.

Like all species within the genus Conus, these snails are predatory and venomous. They are capable of stinging humans, therefore live ones should be handled carefully or not at all.

== Distribution ==
This marine species occurs off the Dominican Republic; in the Caribbean off Guadeloupe; Martinique; off Brazil; in the Mid-Atlantic Ridge.

== Description ==
The maximum recorded shell length is 24.5 mm.

== Habitat ==
Minimum recorded depth is 0 m. Maximum recorded depth is 23 m.
