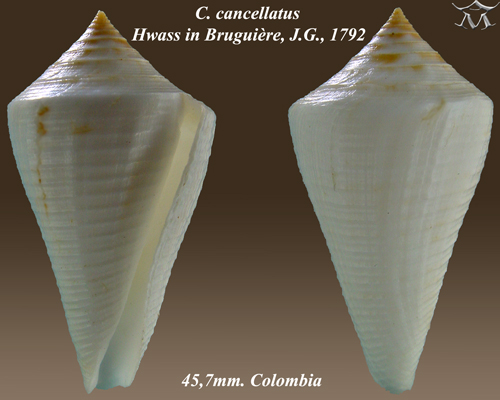
- Apertural and abapertural views of shell of Conus cancellatus Hwass in Bruguière, J.G., 1792
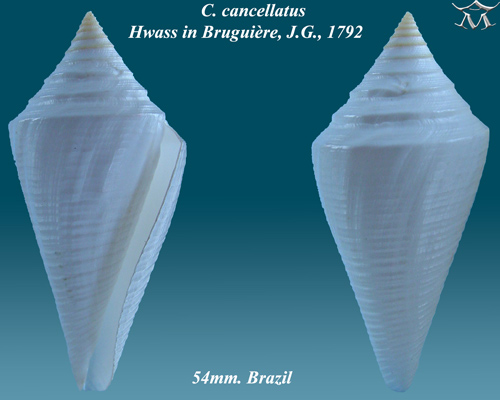

Conservation status
- Least Concern (IUCN 3.1)

Scientific classification
- Kingdom: Animalia
- Phylum: Mollusca
- Class: Gastropoda
- Subclass: Caenogastropoda
- Order: Neogastropoda
- Superfamily: Conoidea
- Family: Conidae
- Genus: Conus
- Species: C. cancellatus

Binomial name
- Conus cancellatus Hwass in Bruguière, 1792

Synonyms
- Conasprella austini Rehder, H.A. & R.T. Abbott, 1951; Conasprella cancellata Hwass in Bruguière, 1792; Conasprelloides cancellatus (Hwass in Bruguière, 1792); Conasprelloides cancellatus cancellatus (Hwass in Bruguière, 1792); Conus austini Rehder & Abbott, 1951; Conus (Dauciconus) cancellatus Hwass in Bruguière, 1792 · accepted, alternate representation; Conus cancellatus cancellatus Hwass in Bruguière, 1792; Conus finkli Petuch, 1987

= Conus cancellatus =

Species of sea snail

Conus cancellatus, common name the cancellate cone, is a species of sea snail, a marine gastropod mollusk in the family Conidae, the cone snails and their allies.

Like all species within the genus Conus, these snails are predatory and venomous. They are capable of stinging humans; live ones should be handled carefully or not at all.

Subspecies

- Conus cancellatus capricorni Van Mol, Tursch & Kempf, 1967
- Conus cancellatus finkli Petuch, 1987 (synonym: Conasprelloides cancellatus finkli (Petuch, 1987) )

== Distribution ==
This species occurs in the Caribbean Sea, the Gulf of Mexico and the Lesser Antilles.

== Description ==
The maximum recorded shell length is 80 mm.

The pear-shaped shell is broad and angulated at the shoulder, contracted towards the base. The body whorl is closely sulcate throughout, the sulci striate. The intervening ridges are rounded. The spire carinate and concavely elevated. Its apex is acute and striate. The color of the shell is whitish, obscurely doubly banded with clouds of light chestnut. The spire is maculated with the same.

== Habitat ==
Minimum recorded depth is 26 m. Maximum recorded depth is 110 m.

== Gallery ==
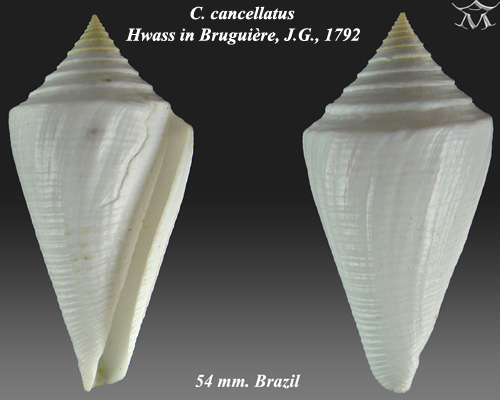
Conus cancellatus

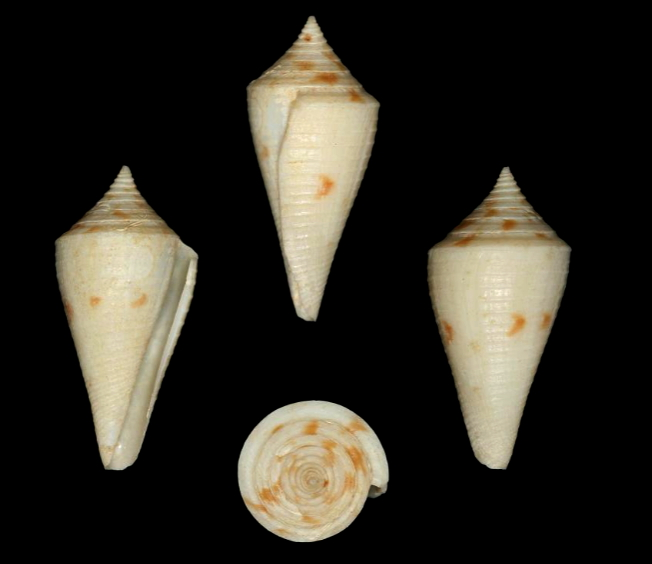
Conus cancellatus finkli, holotype at the Smithsonian Institution
