= Conus classiarius =

Scientific classification
- Kingdom: Animalia
- Phylum: Mollusca
- Class: Gastropoda
- Subclass: Caenogastropoda
- Order: Neogastropoda
- Superfamily: Conoidea
- Family: Conidae
- Genus: Conus
- Species: C. classiarius

Binomial name
- Conus classiarius Hwass in Bruguière, 1792

Species of sea snail

Conus classiarius is a species of sea snail, a marine gastropod mollusk in the family Conidae, the cone snails and their allies.

Like all species within the genus Conus, these snails are predatory and venomous. They are capable of stinging humans, therefore live ones should be handled carefully or not at all.

This species is considered a nomen dubium

== Distribution ==
This marine species occurs off Madagascar.
