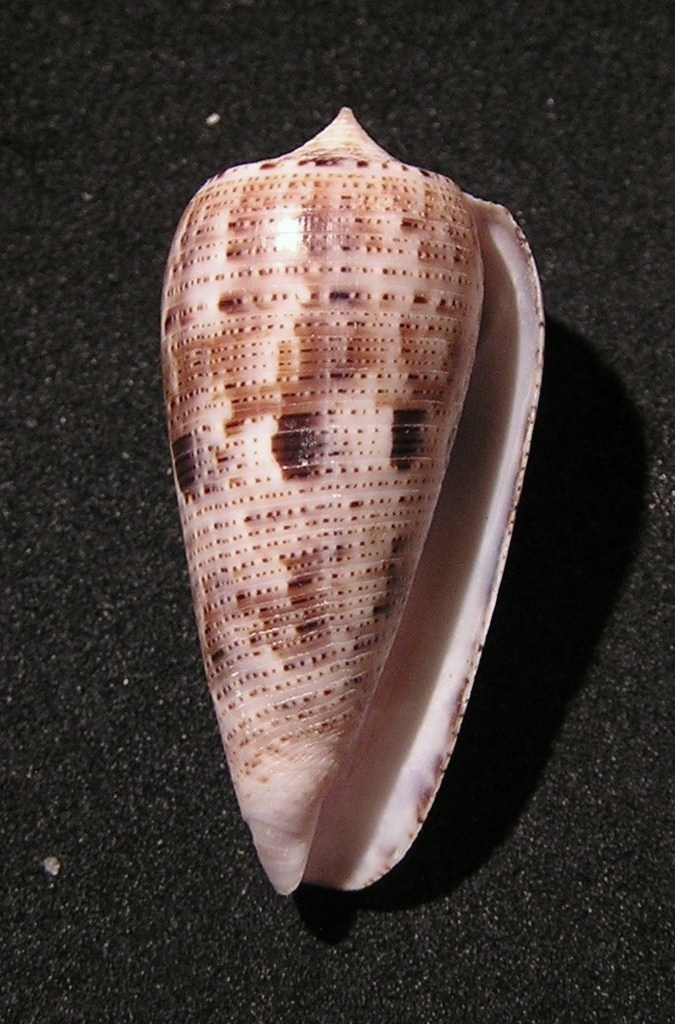
- Apertural view of Conus nimbosus

Conservation status
- Least Concern (IUCN 3.1)

Scientific classification
- Kingdom: Animalia
- Phylum: Mollusca
- Class: Gastropoda
- Subclass: Caenogastropoda
- Order: Neogastropoda
- Superfamily: Conoidea
- Family: Conidae
- Genus: Conus
- Species: C. nimbosus

Binomial name
- Conus nimbosus Hwass in Bruguière, 1792

Synonyms
- Conus (Phasmoconus) nimbosus Hwass in Bruguière, 1792 · accepted, alternate representation; Conus tenellus Holten, 1802; Conus tenellus Dillwyn, 1817; Nimboconus nimbosus (Hwass in Bruguière, 1792); Rolaniconus nimbosus (Hwass in Bruguière, 1792)

= Conus nimbosus =

Species of sea snail

Conus nimbosus, common name the stormy cone, is a species of sea snail, a marine gastropod mollusk in the family Conidae, the cone snails and their allies.

Like all species within the genus Conus, these snails are predatory and venomous. They are capable of stinging humans, therefore live ones should be handled carefully or not at all.

Subspecies

- Conus nimbosus nanoclarus Bozzetti, 2017 (off Madagascar)

== Description ==
The size of an adult shell varies between 33 mm and 65 mm. The color of the rather smooth shell is rosy or violaceous white, with two faint chestnut bands, closely encircled by lines of small chocolate dots. The body whorl shows close revolving grooves. The spire is rather flat and has a greyish white apex.

== Distribution ==
This species occurs in the Indian Ocean off Mozambique, Madagascar, the Seychelles, India, and Sri Lanka; in the Pacific Ocean off Papua New Guinea, Vanuatu, and Samoa.

== Gallery ==
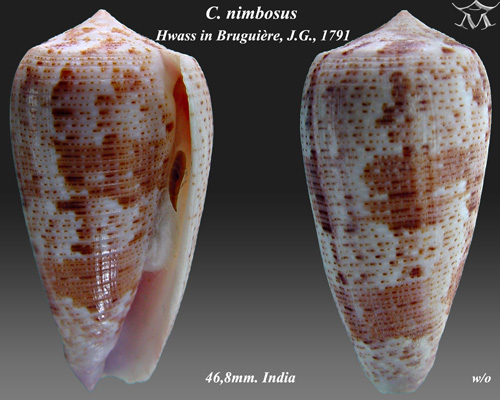
Conus nimbosus Hwass in Bruguière, J.G., 1792

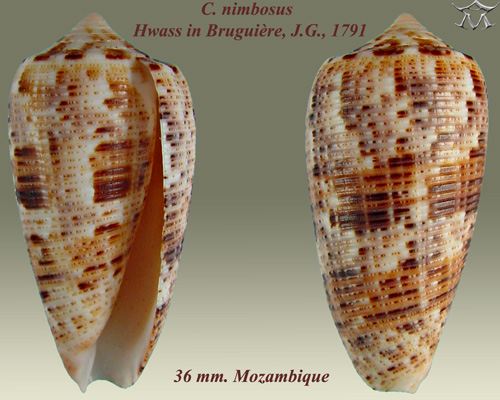
Conus nimbosus Hwass in Bruguière, J.G., 1792

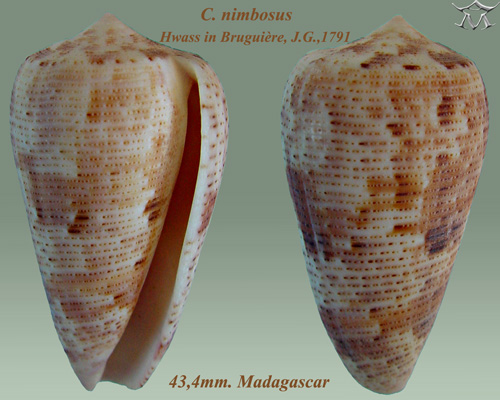
Conus nimbosus Hwass in Bruguière, J.G., 1792

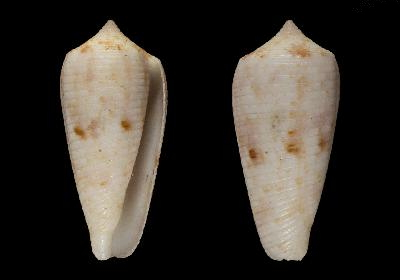
Conus nimbosus nanoclarus Bozzetti, 2017
