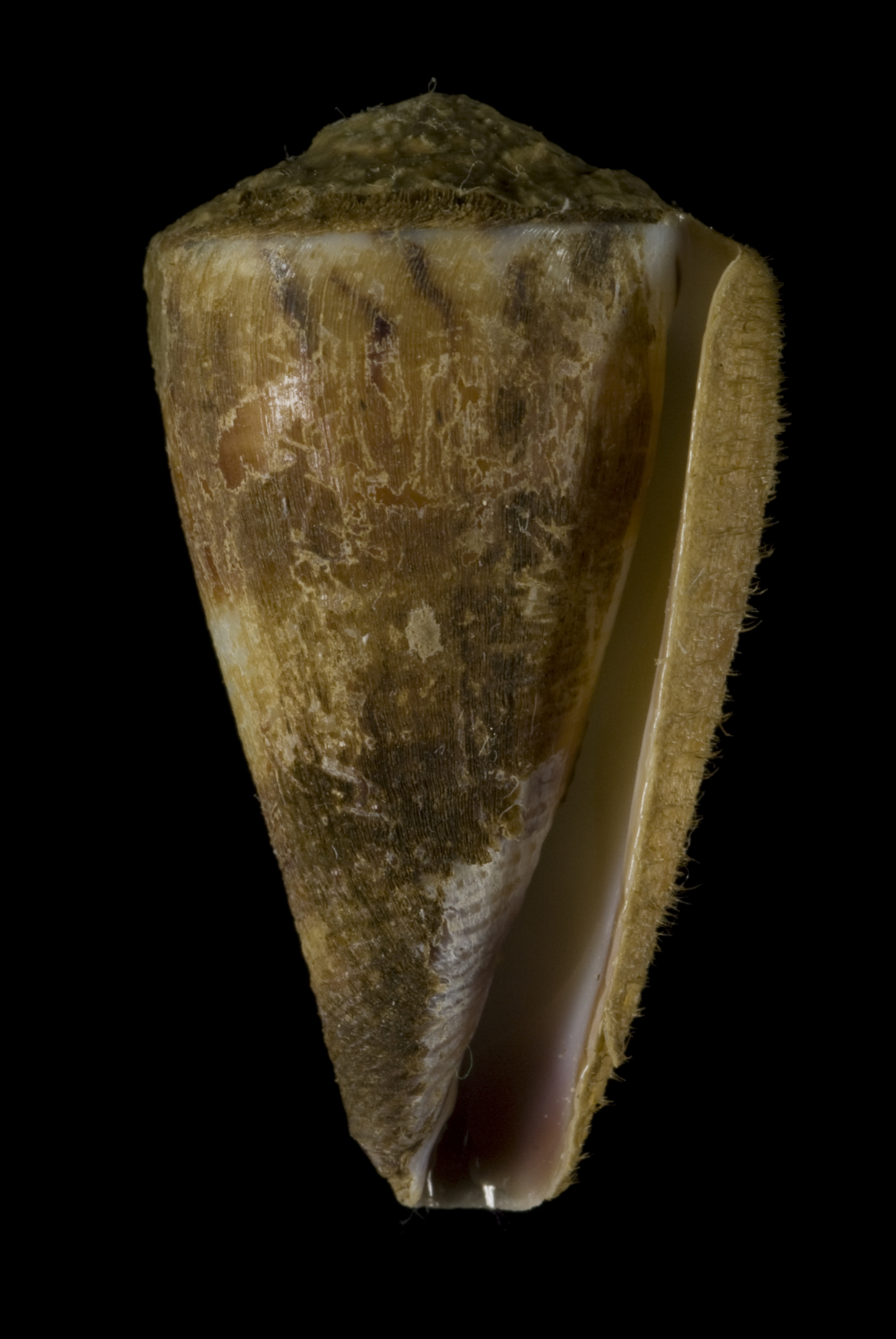
- Shell of Conus vitulinus (specimen at MNHN, Paris)

Scientific classification
- Kingdom: Animalia
- Phylum: Mollusca
- Class: Gastropoda
- Subclass: Caenogastropoda
- Order: Neogastropoda
- Superfamily: Conoidea
- Family: Conidae
- Genus: Conus
- Species: C. vitulinus

Binomial name
- Conus vitulinus Hwass in Bruguière, 1792

Synonyms
- Strategoconus (Vituliconus) vitulinus (Hwass in Bruguière, 1792); Vituliconus planorbis vitulinus Hwass in Bruguière, 1792

= Conus vitulinus =

Species of sea snail

Conus vitulinus is a species of sea snail, a marine gastropod mollusk in the family Conidae, the cone snails and their allies.

Like all species within the genus Conus, these snails are predatory and venomous. They are capable of stinging humans, therefore live ones should be handled carefully or not at all.

The conus vitulinus uses its venom as self-defense to predators, as well as to hunt down its prey, which consists of worms, mulluscs and fish.

== Description ==
The length of the shell varies between 30 mm and 83 mm.

== Distribution ==
This marine species occurs in the Indo-Western Pacific.
