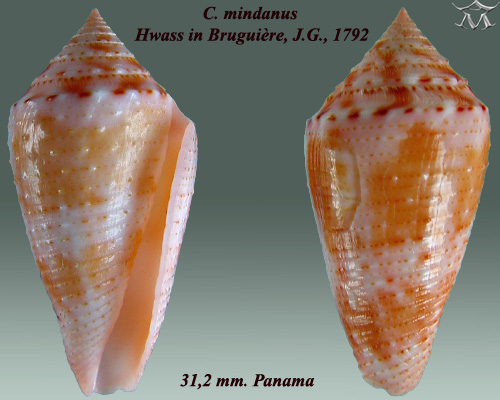
- Apertural and abapertural views of shell of Conasprella mindana (Hwass in Bruguière, J.G., 1792)

Conservation status
- Least Concern (IUCN 3.1)

Scientific classification
- Kingdom: Animalia
- Phylum: Mollusca
- Class: Gastropoda
- Subclass: Caenogastropoda
- Order: Neogastropoda
- Superfamily: Conoidea
- Family: Conidae
- Genus: Conasprella
- Species: C. mindana

Binomial name
- Conasprella mindana (Hwass in Bruguière, 1792)

Synonyms
- Conasprella (Ximeniconus) mindana (Hwass in Bruguière, 1792) · accepted, alternate representation; Conus bermudensis lymani Clench, 1942; Conus cretaceus Kiener, 1845; Conus elventinus Duclos, 1833; Conus karinae Nowell-Usticke, 1968; Conus mackintoshi (Petuch, 2013); Conus mindanus Hwass in Bruguière, 1792 (original combination); Conus rosaceus G. B. Sowerby II, 1834; Jaspidiconus mackintoshi Petuch, 2013; Jaspidiconus mindanus (Hwass in Bruguière, 1792)

= Conasprella mindana =

Species of gastropod

Conasprella mindana is a species of sea snail, a marine gastropod mollusk in the family Conidae, the cone snails and their allies.

Like all species within the genus Conasprella, these snails are predatory and venomous. They are capable of stinging humans, therefore live ones should be handled carefully or not at all.

== Subspecies ==
- Conasprella mindanus bermudensis Clench, W.J., 1962
- Conasprella mindana mindana (Hwass in Bruguière, 1792)

== Distribution ==
Locus typicus: (of C. mindanus agassizii) "Off Santa Cruz (=St. Croix, Virgin Islands) in 115 fathoms. Specimens of the type material conspecific with C. agassizi were also collected off Barbados, in 76 fathoms."

This marine species occurs in the Caribbean Sea off Costa Rica, Guadeloupe and Curacao; in the Atlantic Ocean off Eastern Brazil, Barbados and Bermuda

== Description ==
The maximum recorded shell length is 50 mm.

== Habitat ==
The minimum recorded depth for this species is 0 m; the maximum recorded depth is 210 m.

== Gallery ==
Below are several color forms and one subspecies:

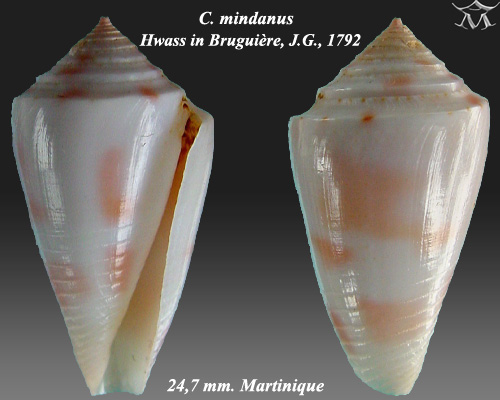
Conasprella mindana (Hwass in Bruguière, J.G., 1792)

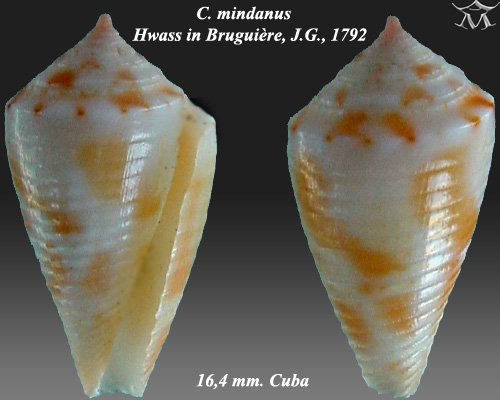
Conasprella mindana (Hwass in Bruguière, J.G., 1792)

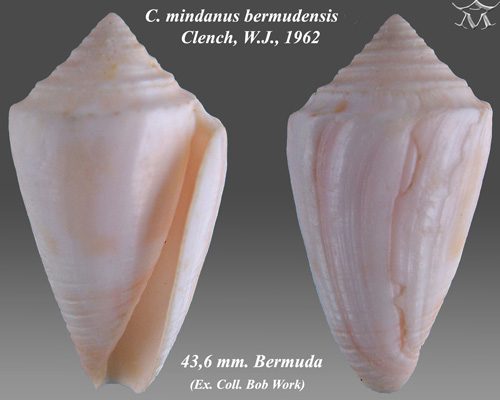
Conasprella mindana bermudensis Clench, W.J., 1962
