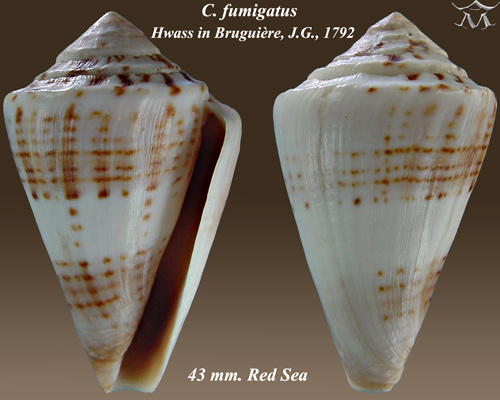
- Apertural and abapertural views of shell of Conus fumigatus Hwass in Bruguière, J.G., 1792

Conservation status
- Least Concern (IUCN 3.1)

Scientific classification
- Kingdom: Animalia
- Phylum: Mollusca
- Class: Gastropoda
- Subclass: Caenogastropoda
- Order: Neogastropoda
- Superfamily: Conoidea
- Family: Conidae
- Genus: Conus
- Species: C. fumigatus

Binomial name
- Conus fumigatus Hwass in Bruguière, 1792

Synonyms
- Conus (Splinoconus) fumigatus Hwass in Bruguière, 1792 accepted, alternate representation; Conus blainvillei Kiener, 1845; Conus excavatus G. B. Sowerby II, 1866; Conus henoquei Bernardi, 1860; Conus luctificus Reeve, 1848; Conus pazii Bernardi, 1857; Conus richardi Fenaux, 1942; Rhizoconus fumigatus (Hwass in Bruguière, 1792) ·

= Conus fumigatus =

Species of sea snail

Conus fumigatus, common name the smoky cone, is a species of sea snail, a marine gastropod mollusk in the family Conidae, the cone snails and their allies.

Like all species within the genus Conus, these snails are predatory and venomous. They are capable of stinging humans, therefore live ones should be handled carefully or not at all.

== Description ==
The size of the shell varies between 30 mm and 69 mm.

== Distribution ==
This species occurs in the Red Sea off Ethiopia; in the Libyan part of the Mediterranean Sea (as an introduced species).
