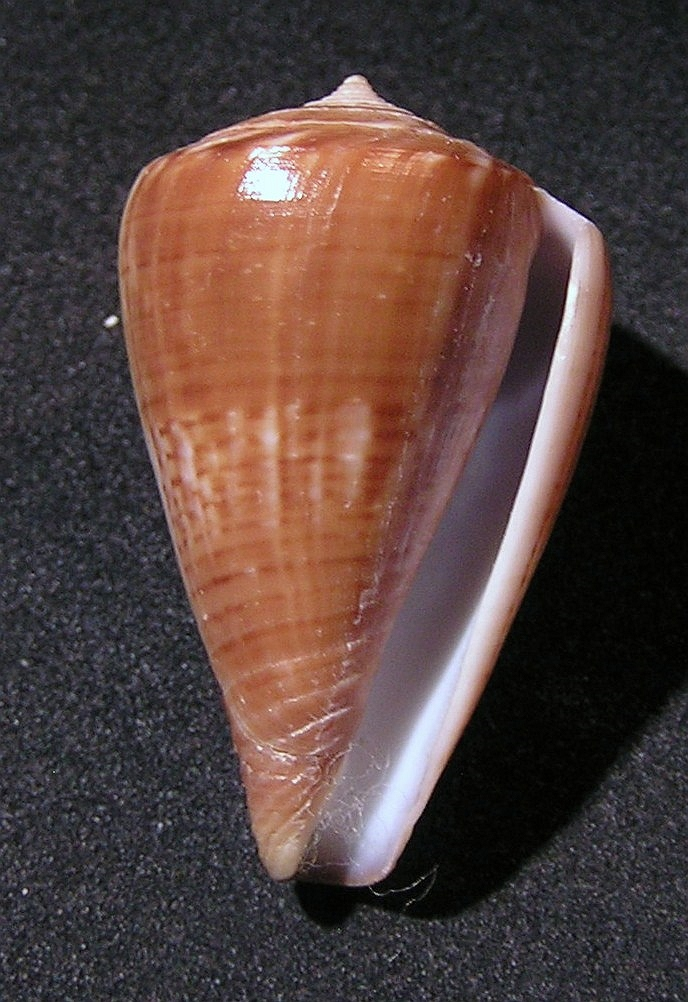
- Conus hyaena
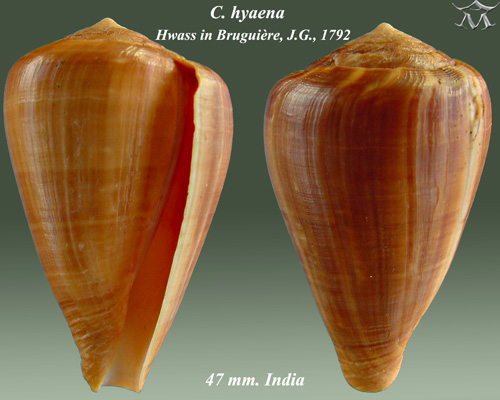

Conservation status
- Least Concern (IUCN 3.1)

Scientific classification
- Kingdom: Animalia
- Phylum: Mollusca
- Class: Gastropoda
- Subclass: Caenogastropoda
- Order: Neogastropoda
- Superfamily: Conoidea
- Family: Conidae
- Genus: Conus
- Species: C. hyaena

Binomial name
- Conus hyaena Hwass in Bruguière, 1792

Synonyms
- Conus (Rhizoconus) hyaena Hwass in Bruguière, 1792 · accepted, alternate representation; Conus halli da Motta, 1983; Conus incarnatus Reeve, 1844; Conus kobelti Löbbecke & Kobelt, 1882; Conus mutabilis sensu Chemnitz Reeve, 1844; Conus tribunus Crosse, 1865 (invalid: junior homonym of Conus tribunus Gmelin, 1791); Conus unicolor G. B. Sowerby II, 1834; Phasmoconus halli Motta, A.J. da, 1983; Rhizoconus hyaena hyaena Hwass in Bruguière, 1792; Rhizoconus hyaena Hwass in Bruguière, 1792

= Conus hyaena =

Species of sea snail

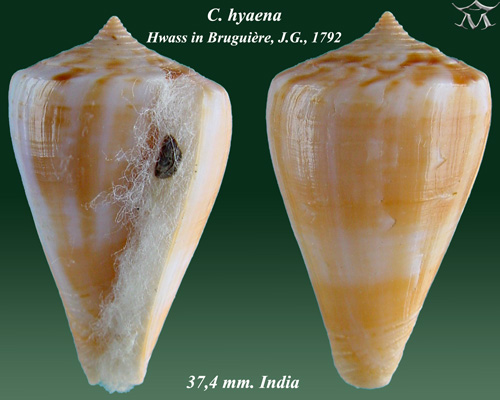
Conus hyaena Hwass in Bruguière, J.G., 1792

Conus hyaena, common name the hyena cone, is a species of sea snail, a marine gastropod mollusk in the family Conidae, the cone snails and their allies.

These snails are predatory and venomous. They are capable of stinging humans, therefore live ones should be handled carefully or not at all.

Subspecies

- Conus hyaena concolor G. B. Sowerby II, 1841 (synonym: Conus concolor G. B. Sowerby II, 1841)
- Conus hyaena hyaena Hwass in Bruguière, 1792

== Description ==
The size of an adult shell varies between 29 mm and 80.5 mm. The shell is somewhat swollen above. The spire is striate. The color of the shell is light yellowish brown, variegated by darker striations, and faint revolving lines or rows of spots, often indistinctly lighter-banded in the middle.

== Distribution ==
This species occurs in the Indian Ocean off Madagascar, in the Bay of Bengal, and in the Pacific Ocean off the Philippines and Indonesia; in the South China Sea.
