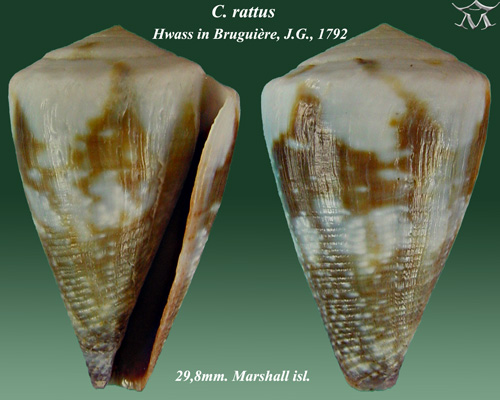
- Two views of a shell of Conus rattus

Scientific classification
- Kingdom: Animalia
- Phylum: Mollusca
- Class: Gastropoda
- Subclass: Caenogastropoda
- Order: Neogastropoda
- Superfamily: Conoidea
- Family: Conidae
- Genus: Conus
- Species: C. rattus

Binomial name
- Conus rattus Hwass in Bruguière, 1792

Synonyms
- Conus (Rhizoconus) rattus Hwass in Bruguière, 1792 · accepted, alternate representation; Conus chemnitzii Dillwyn, 1817; Conus rattus var. tahitiensis Dautzenberg, 1933; Conus semivelatus G. B. Sowerby III, 1882; Conus taheitensis Reeve, 1843; Conus tahitiensis Dautzenberg, 1933; Conus taitensis Hwass in Bruguiere, 1792; Conus viridis G. B. Sowerby II, 1857; Rhizoconus rattus (Hwass in Bruguière, 1792)

= Conus rattus =

Species of sea snail

Conus rattus, common name the rat cone, is a species of sea snail, a marine gastropod mollusk in the family Conidae, the cone snails and their allies.

Like all species within the genus Conus, these snails are predatory and venomous. They are capable of stinging humans, therefore live ones should be handled carefully or not at all.

== Description ==
The size of the shell varies between 25 mm and 70 mm. Typically found in water on sand or in crevices with a depth of 0 to −6,737 meters (0 to −22,103 ft).

The color of the shell is yellowish brown or ash-color, often with fine close chestnut revolving lines, with large white spots and maculations usually forming an interrupted central band and another at the shoulder. The shell has a flattish spire, rounded shoulders and several spiral ridges around the base of the body whorl. The aperture is pale purple.

== Distribution ==
This species occurs in the Red Sea; in the Indian Ocean off Madagascar, Tanzania, Chagos, Aldabra, the Mascarene Islands; as an alien in the eastern part of the Mediterranean Sea; in the tropical Pacific Ocean and off Polynesia; off Australia (Northern Territory, Queensland and Western Australia)

== Gallery ==
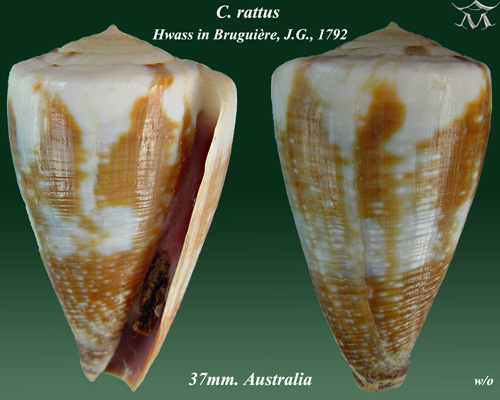
Conus rattus Hwass in Bruguière, J.G., 1792

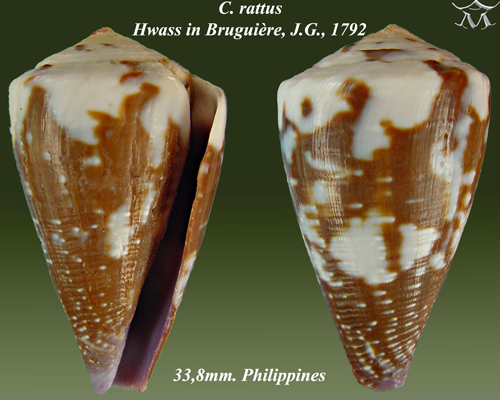
Conus rattus Hwass in Bruguière, J.G., 1792

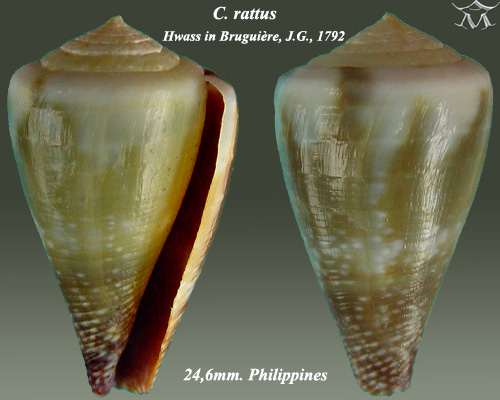
Conus rattus Hwass in Bruguière, J.G., 1792

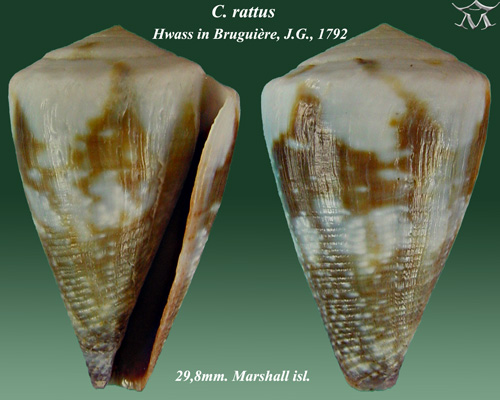
Conus rattus Hwass in Bruguière, J.G., 1792

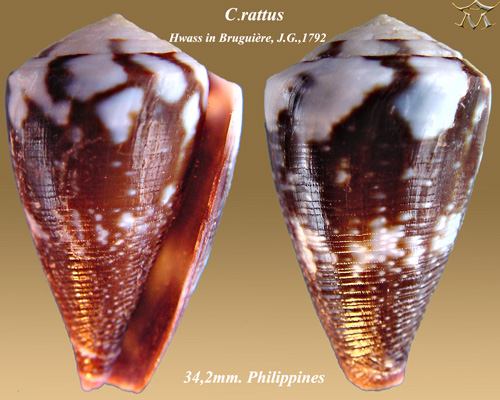
Conus rattus Hwass in Bruguière, J.G., 1792

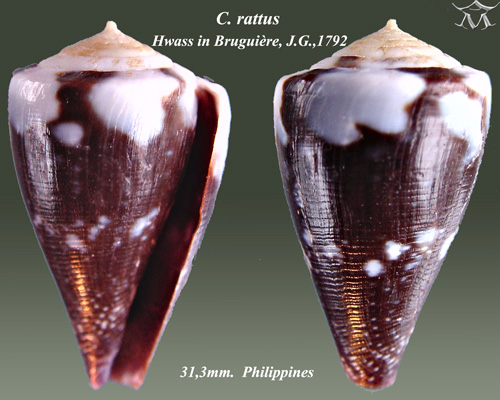
Conus rattus Hwass in Bruguière, J.G., 1792
