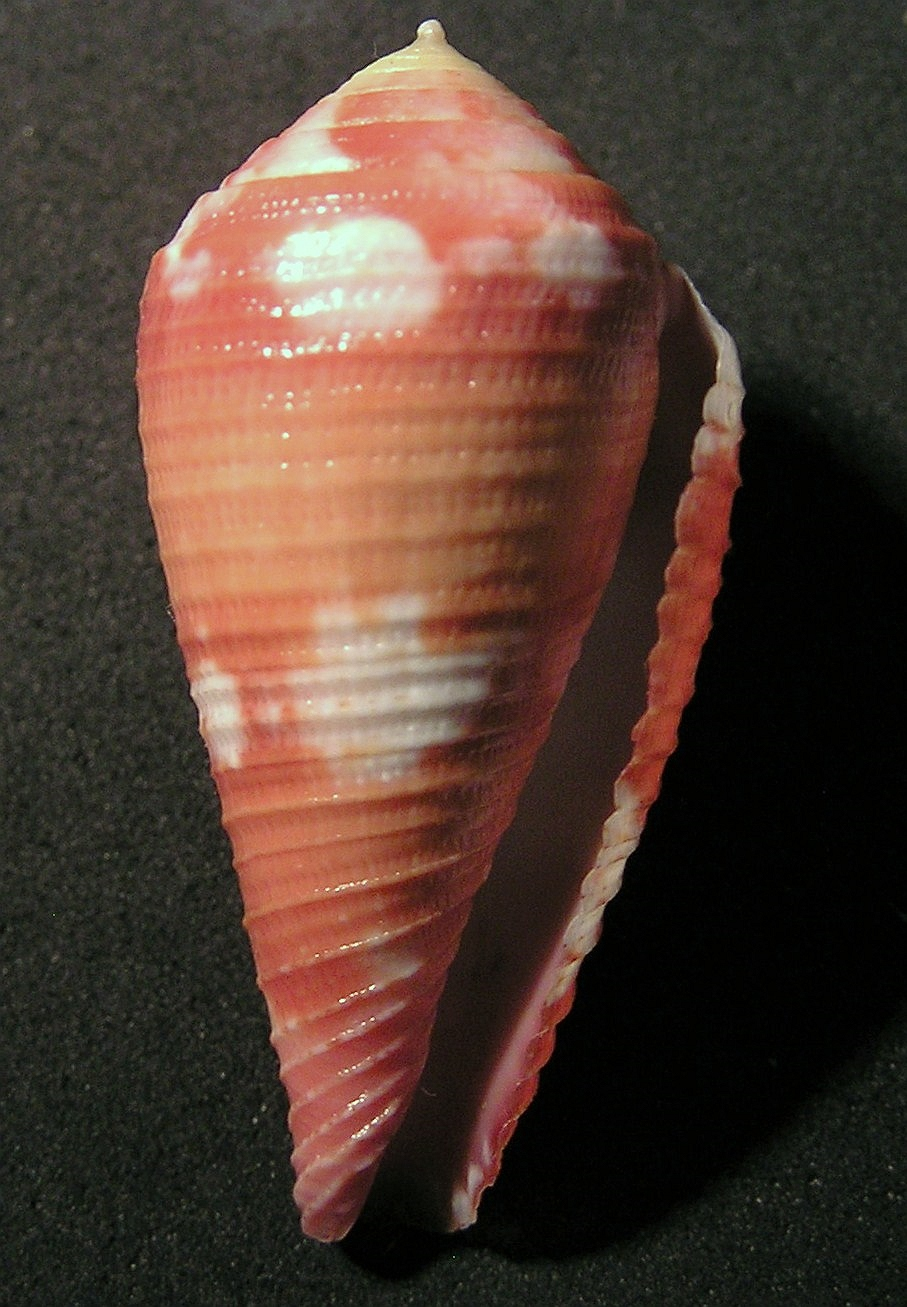
- Apertural view of Conus pertusus

Conservation status
- Least Concern (IUCN 3.1)

Scientific classification
- Kingdom: Animalia
- Phylum: Mollusca
- Class: Gastropoda
- Subclass: Caenogastropoda
- Order: Neogastropoda
- Superfamily: Conoidea
- Family: Conidae
- Genus: Conus
- Species: C. pertusus

Binomial name
- Conus pertusus Hwass in Bruguière, 1792

Synonyms
- Conus (Rhizoconus) pertusus Hwass in Bruguière, 1792 · accepted, alternate representation; Conus amabilis Lamarck, 1810; Conus festivus Dillwyn, 1817; Dendroconus pertusus (Hwass in Bruguière, 1792); Rhizoconus pertusus (Hwass in Bruguière, 1792)

= Conus pertusus =

Species of sea snail

Conus pertusus, common name the pertusus cone or the lovely cone, is a species of sea snail, a marine gastropod mollusk in the family Conidae, the cone snails and their allies.

Like all species within the genus Conus, these snails are predatory and venomous. They are capable of stinging humans, therefore live ones should be handled carefully or not at all.

Subspecies

- Conus pertusus elodieallaryae (T. Cossignani, 2013)
- Conus pertusus pertusus Hwass in Bruguière, 1792

== Description ==
The size of an adult shell varies between 20 mm and 69 mm. The spire is convex, rather obtuse. The body whorl is encircled by distant punctate striae. The color of the shell is rosy tinged with yellow and interruptedly banded with white blotches below the shoulder and in the middle of the body-whorl.

== Distribution ==
This species occurs in the Indian Ocean off Chagos, the Mascarene Basin and Mauritius; in the entire Indo-Pacific; off Australia (Northern Territory, Queensland and Western Australia).

== Gallery ==
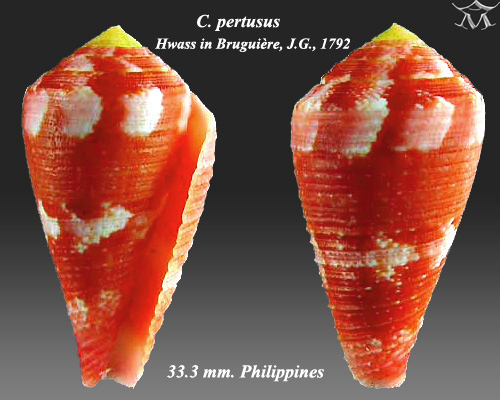
Conus pertusus Hwass in Bruguière, J.G., 1792

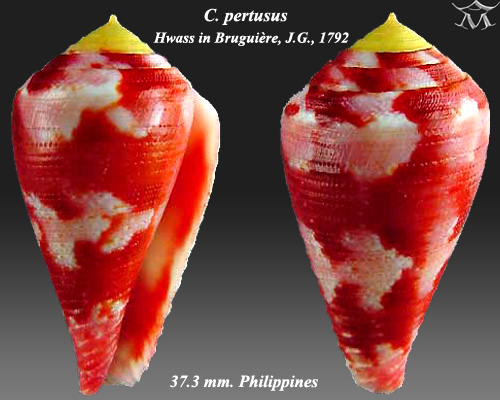
Conus pertusus Hwass in Bruguière, J.G., 1792

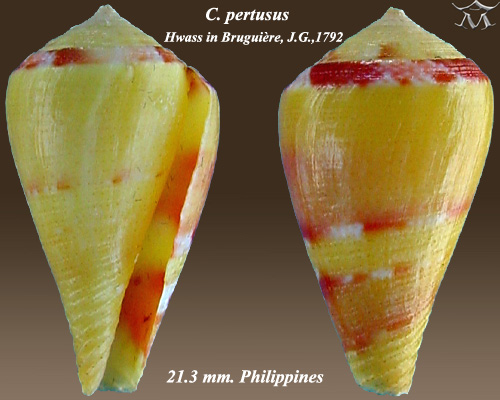
Conus pertusus Hwass in Bruguière, J.G., 1792

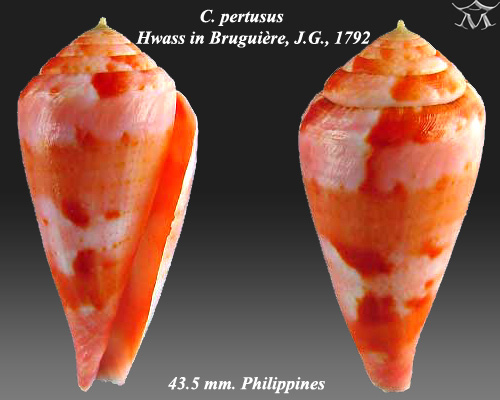
Conus pertusus Hwass in Bruguière, J.G., 1792
