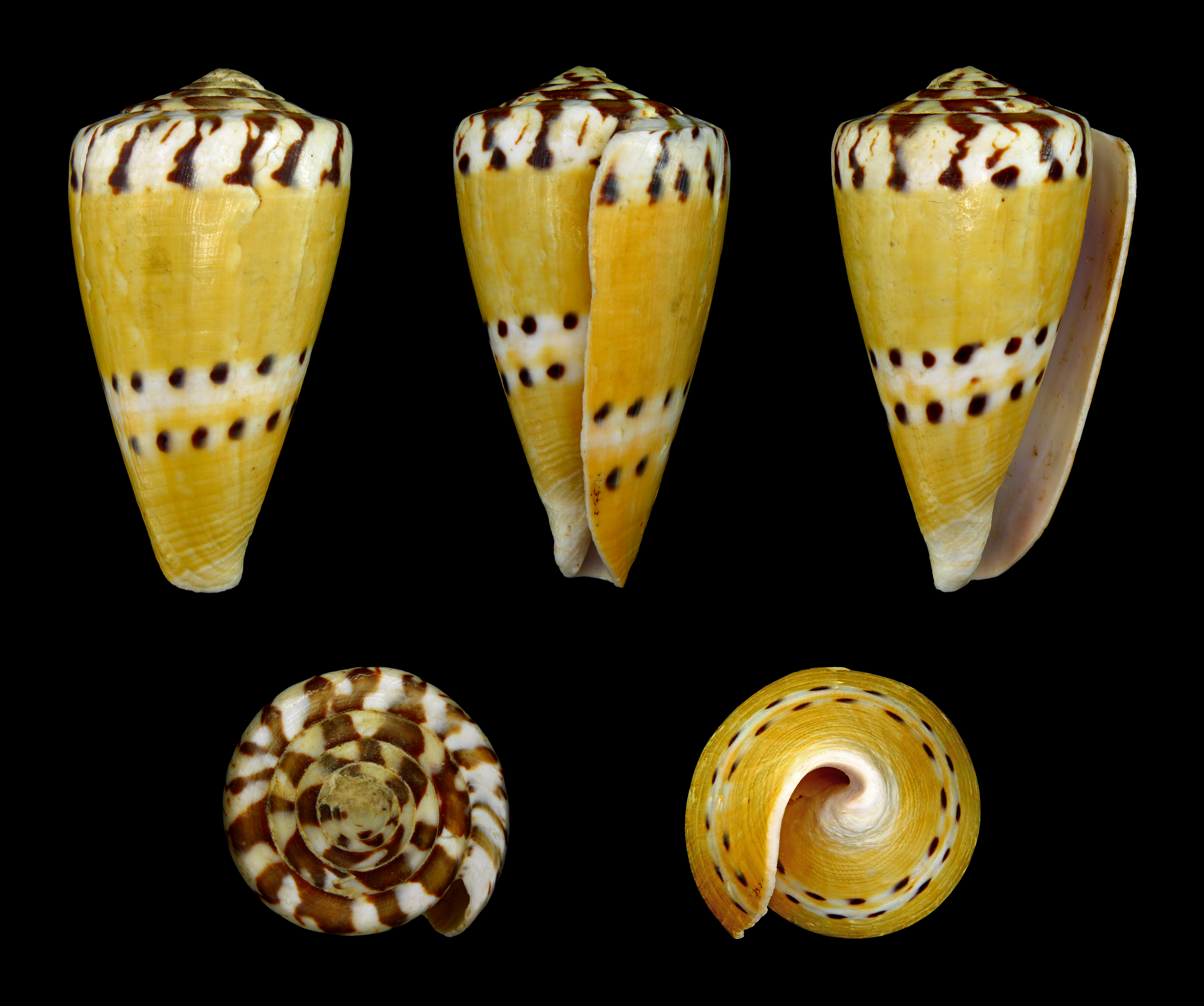

Scientific classification
- Kingdom: Animalia
- Phylum: Mollusca
- Class: Gastropoda
- Subclass: Caenogastropoda
- Order: Neogastropoda
- Superfamily: Conoidea
- Family: Conidae
- Genus: Conus
- Species: C. mustelinus

Binomial name
- Conus mustelinus Hwass in Bruguière, 1792

Synonyms
- Conus (Rhizoconus) mustelinus Hwass in Bruguière, 1792 · accepted, alternate representation; Conus australis Schröter, 1803 (invalid: junior homonym of Conus australis Holten, 1802); Conus melinus Shikama, 1964; Conus zukiae Shikama, 1979; Rhizoconus melinus Shikama, 1964; Rhizoconus mustelinus (Hwass in Bruguière, 1792)

= Conus mustelinus =

Species of sea snail

Conus mustelinus, common name the ermine cone, is a species of sea snail, a marine gastropod mollusk in the family Conidae, the cone snails and their allies.

These snails are predatory and venomous. They are capable of stinging humans, therefore live ones should be handled carefully or not at all.

== Description ==
The size of an adult shell varies between 40 mm and 107 mm. The low spire is striate, flamed with chocolate and white. The body whorl is yellowish, or orange-brown, encircled by rows of chestnut dots, usually stained chocolate at the base. There is a central white band, with chocolate hieroglyphic markings on either side, and a shoulder band, crossed by chocolate smaller longitudinal markings. The border markings of the bands are reduced to spots. The aperture has a chocolate color with a white band.

== Distribution ==
This species occurs in the Indian Ocean from the Chagos Atoll to Western Australia; in the Pacific Ocean, from Japan to Philippines, Eastern Australia and Fiji.

== Gallery ==
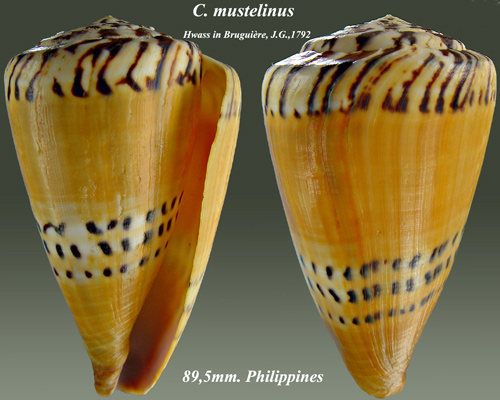
Conus mustelinus Hwass in Bruguière, J.G., 1792

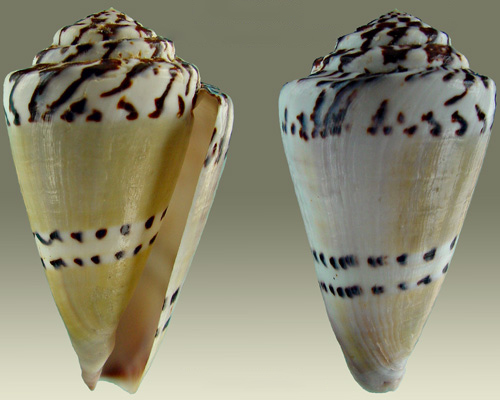
Conus mustelinus Hwass in Bruguière, J.G., 1792
