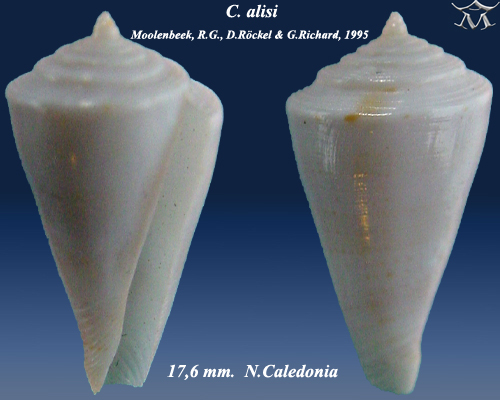
- Apertural and abapertural views of shell of Conasprella alisi (Moolenbeek, R.G., D.Röckel & G.Richard, 1995)
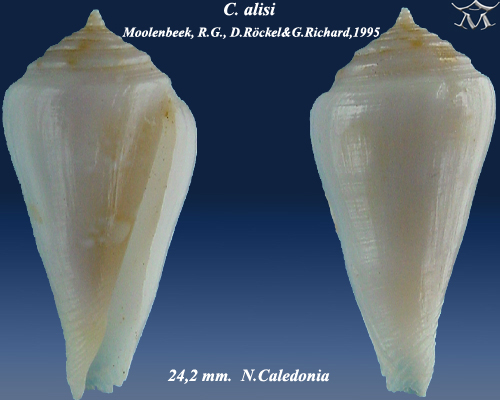

Conservation status
- Least Concern (IUCN 3.1)

Scientific classification
- Kingdom: Animalia
- Phylum: Mollusca
- Class: Gastropoda
- Subclass: Caenogastropoda
- Order: Neogastropoda
- Superfamily: Conoidea
- Family: Conidae
- Genus: Conasprella
- Species: C. alisi

Binomial name
- Conasprella alisi (Röckel, Richard, & Moolenbeek, 1995)

Synonyms
- Boucheticonus alisi (Moolenbeek, Röckel & Richard, 1995); Conasprella (Boucheticonus) alisi (Moolenbeek, Röckel & Richard, 1995) · accepted, alternate representation; Conus alisi Moolenbeek, Röckel & Richard, 1995 (original combination); Rhizoconus alisi (Moolenbeek, Röckel & Richard, 1995)

= Conasprella alisi =

Species of gastropod

Conasprella alisi is a species of sea snail, a marine gastropod mollusk in the family Conidae, the cone snails and their allies.

Like all species within the genus Conasprella, these snails are predatory and venomous. They are capable of stinging humans, therefore live ones should be handled carefully or not at all.

== Description ==
The size of the shell varies between 15 mm and 30 mm.

== Distribution ==
This marine species occurs off New Caledonia.
