= Conus kiicumulus =

Scientific classification
- Kingdom: Animalia
- Phylum: Mollusca
- Class: Gastropoda
- Subclass: Caenogastropoda
- Order: Neogastropoda
- Superfamily: Conoidea
- Family: Conidae
- Genus: Conus
- Species: C. kiicumulus

Binomial name
- Conus kiicumulus (Azuma, 1982)

Synonyms
- Asprella kiicumulus (Azuma, 1982); Conus nebulosus Azuma, M., 1973 (renamed); Conus (Phasmoconus) kiicumulus (Azuma, 1982) · accepted, alternate representation; Graphiconus kiicumulus (Azuma, 1982); Phasmoconus kiicumulus (Azuma, 1982); Rhizoconus kiicumulus Azuma, 1982 (original combination); Rhizoconus nebulosus Azuma, 1973 (Invalid: junior secondary homonym of Conus nebulosus Gmelin, 1791, and several others; Rhizoconus kiicumulus Azuma, 1982 is a replacement name)

Species of sea snail

Conus kiicumulus is a species of sea snail, a marine gastropod mollusk in the family Conidae, the cone snails and their allies.

Like all species within the genus Conus, these snails are predatory and venomous. They are capable of stinging humans, therefore live ones should be handled carefully or not at all.

== Description ==
The size of the shell varies between 30 mm and 41 mm.

== Distribution ==
This species occurs in the Pacific Ocean off Southern Japan and the Ryukyu Islands.
