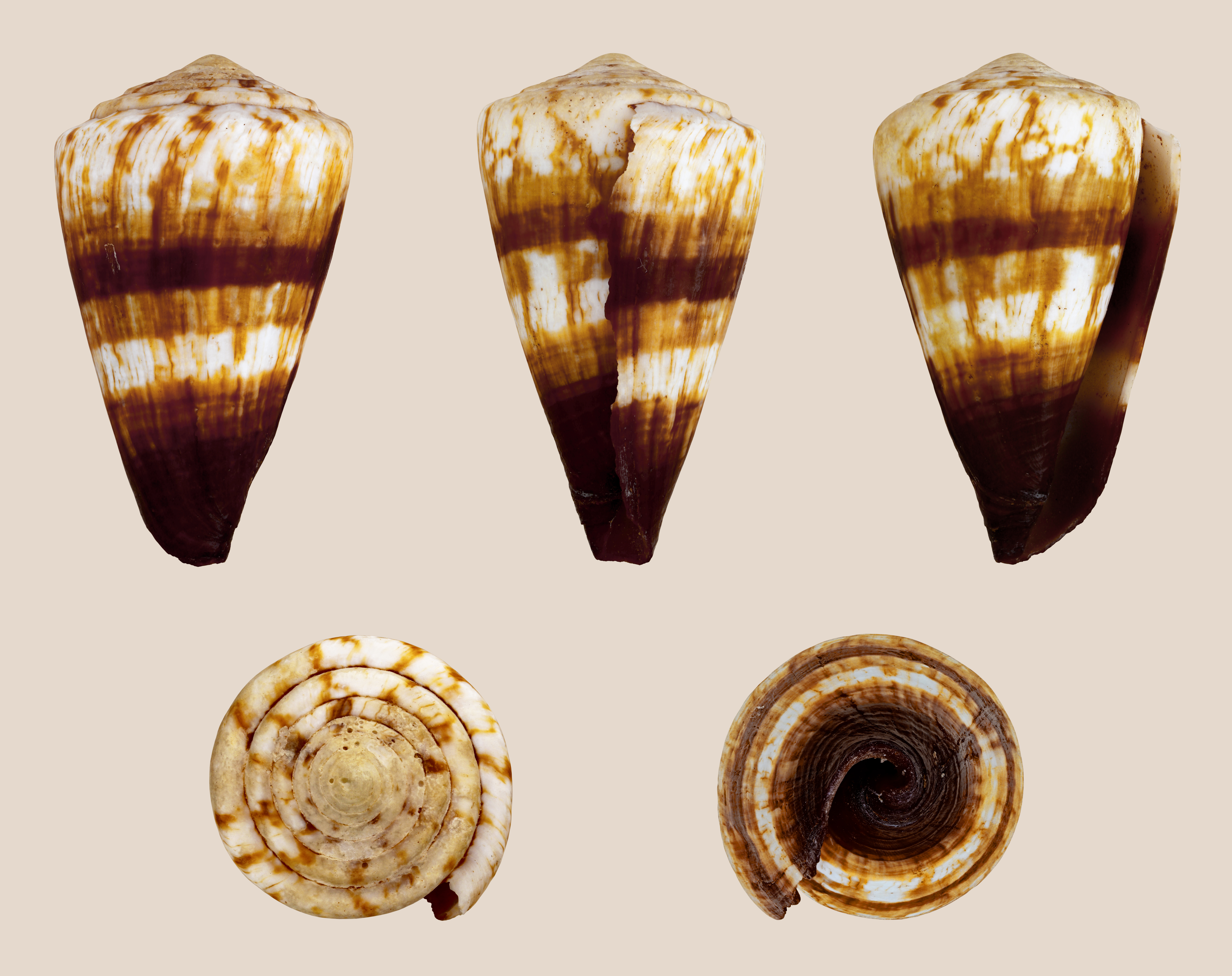

Conservation status
- Least Concern (IUCN 3.1)

Scientific classification
- Kingdom: Animalia
- Phylum: Mollusca
- Class: Gastropoda
- Subclass: Caenogastropoda
- Order: Neogastropoda
- Superfamily: Conoidea
- Family: Conidae
- Genus: Conus
- Species: C. miles

Binomial name
- Conus miles Linnaeus, 1758

Synonyms
- Conus (Rhizoconus) miles Linnaeus, 1758 · accepted, alternate representation; Rhizoconus miles Linnaeus, 1758

= Conus miles =

Species of sea snail

Conus miles, common name the soldier cone, is a species of sea snail, a marine gastropod mollusk in the family Conidae, the cone snails and their allies.

Like all species within the genus Conus, these snails are predatory and venomous. They are capable of stinging humans, therefore live ones should be handled carefully or not at all.

== Description ==
The size of an adult shell varies between 50 mm and 136 mm. The spire is obsoletely tuberculate or smooth and rather depressed. The thick shell has nodular shoulders of whorls. The body whorl is bordered by a broad shoulder and is spirally ridged at the base. The color of the thick shell is yellowish white or pale orange, with close narrow, wavy, thread-like longitudinal chestnut striations, interrupted by a chocolate, fairly narrow, revolving band above the middle. The base is stained chocolate, bordered upwards by progressively lighter bands. The aperture is banded, chocolate and white.

== Distribution ==
This cone snail is found in Aldabra, Chagos, Madagascar, Mascarene Basin, Mauritius, Mozambique, the Red Sea and Tanzania. and in the entire Indo-Pacific; off Australia (Northern Territory, Queensland, Western Australia).

== Gallery ==
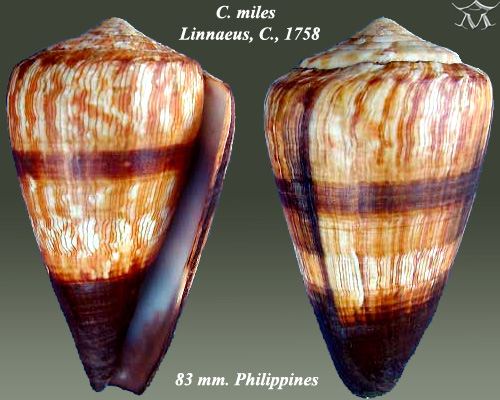
Conus miles Linnaeus, C., 1758

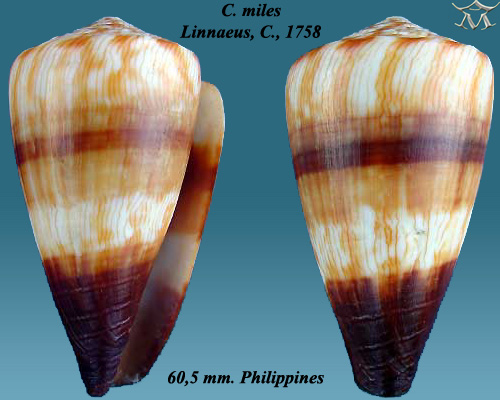
Conus miles Linnaeus, C., 1758

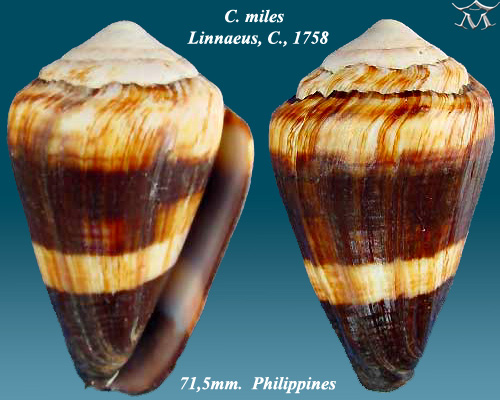
Conus miles Linnaeus, C., 1758

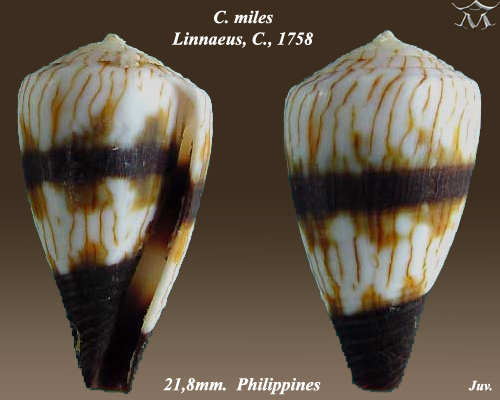
Conus miles Linnaeus, C., 1758
