= Conus wilsi =

Scientific classification
- Domain: Eukaryota
- Kingdom: Animalia
- Phylum: Mollusca
- Class: Gastropoda
- Subclass: Caenogastropoda
- Order: Neogastropoda
- Superfamily: Conoidea
- Family: Conidae
- Genus: Conus
- Species: C. wilsi

Binomial name
- Conus wilsi Delsaerdt, 1998

Synonyms
- Conus (Rhizoconus) wilsi Delsaerdt, 1998 · accepted, alternate representation; Rhizoconus wilsi (Delsaerdt, 1998)

Species of sea snail

Conus wilsi is a species of sea snail, a marine gastropod mollusk in the family Conidae, the cone snails and their allies.

Like all species within the genus Conus, these snails are predatory and venomous. They are capable of stinging humans, therefore they should be handled carefully or not at all.

== Description ==
The size of the shell attains 30 mm.

== Distribution ==
This species occurs in the Red Sea.
