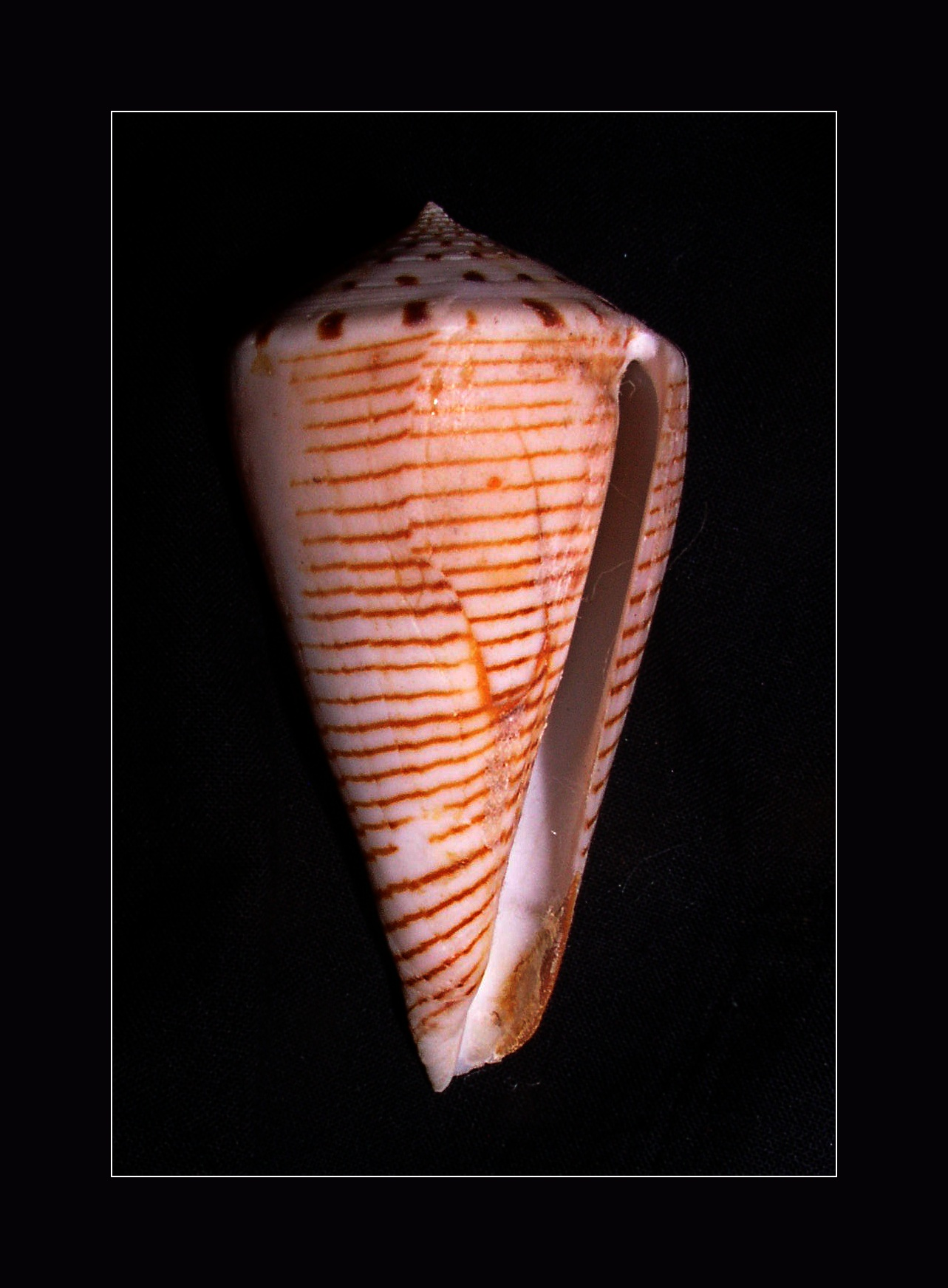
- Conus hirasei
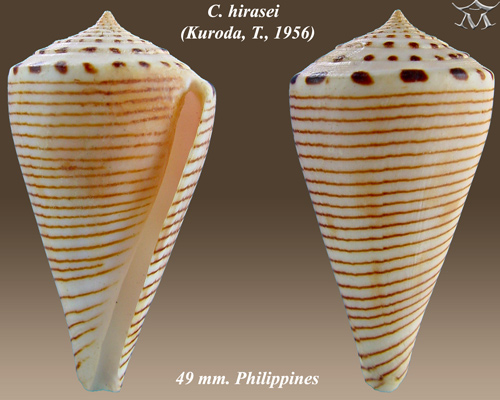

Scientific classification
- Kingdom: Animalia
- Phylum: Mollusca
- Class: Gastropoda
- Subclass: Caenogastropoda
- Order: Neogastropoda
- Superfamily: Conoidea
- Family: Conidae
- Genus: Conus
- Species: C. hirasei

Binomial name
- Conus hirasei (Kuroda, 1956)

Synonyms
- Continuconus hirasei (Kuroda, 1956); Conus (Klemaeconus) hirasei (Kuroda, 1956) · accepted, alternate representation; Kioconus hirasei (Kuroda, 1956); Rhizoconus hirasei Kuroda, 1956

= Conus hirasei =

Species of sea snail

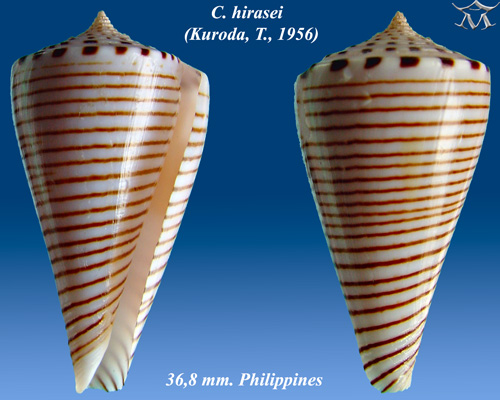
Conus hirasei (Kuroda, T., 1956)

Conus hirasei, common name Hirase's cone, is a species of sea snail, a marine gastropod mollusk in the family Conidae, the cone snails and their allies.

Like all species within the genus Conus, these snails are predatory and venomous. They are capable of stinging humans, therefore live ones should be handled carefully or not at all.

== Description ==
The size of the shell varies between 40 mm and 92 mm.

== Distribution ==
This marine species occurs from Southern Japan to the Philippines.
