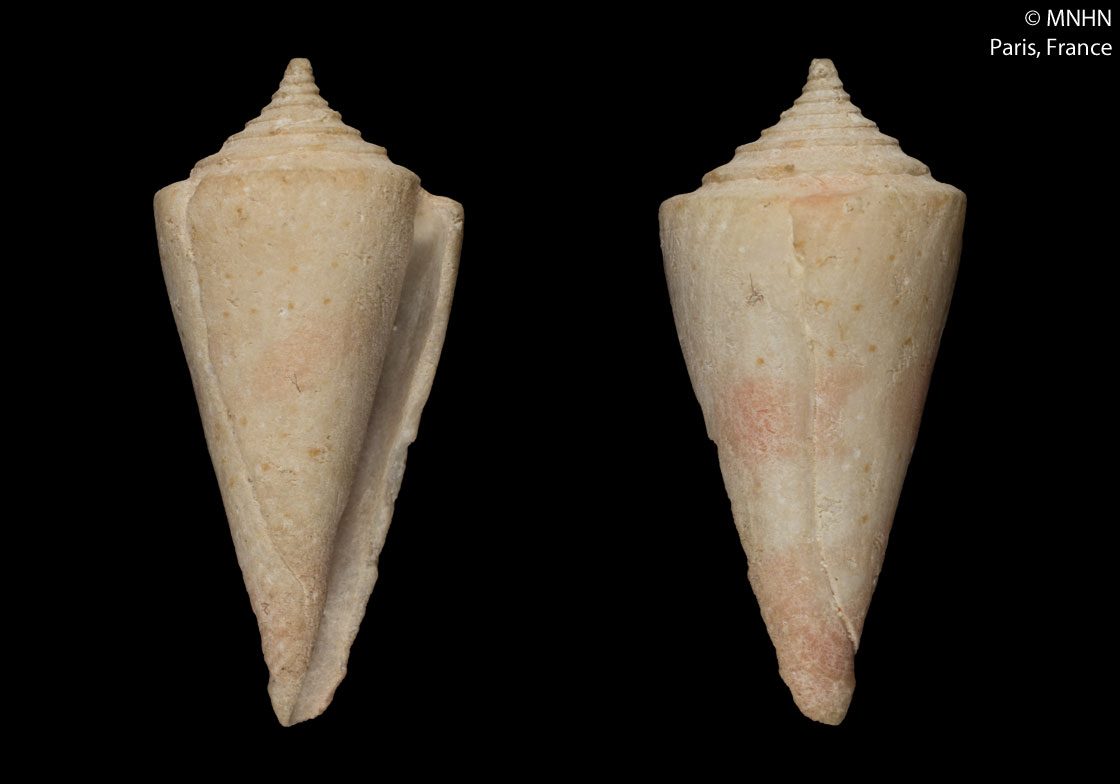
- Shell of Conasprella tirardi (specimen at MNHN, Paris)

Conservation status
- Data Deficient (IUCN 3.1)

Scientific classification
- Kingdom: Animalia
- Phylum: Mollusca
- Class: Gastropoda
- Subclass: Caenogastropoda
- Order: Neogastropoda
- Superfamily: Conoidea
- Family: Conidae
- Genus: Conasprella
- Species: C. tirardi

Binomial name
- Conasprella tirardi (Röckel & Moolenbeek, 1996)

Synonyms
- Conus (Rhizoconus) tirardi Röckel & Moolenbeek, 1996; Conus tirardi Röckel & Moolenbeek, 1996; Rhizoconus tirardi (Röckel & Moolenbeek, 1996)

= Conasprella tirardi =

Species of gastropod

Conasprella tirardi is a species of sea snail, a marine gastropod mollusk in the family Conidae, the cone snails and their allies.

== Description ==
The length of the shell varies between 17 mm and 31 mm.

== Distribution ==
This marine species occurs off New Caledonia, the Tuamotus, and the Pitcairn Islands.
