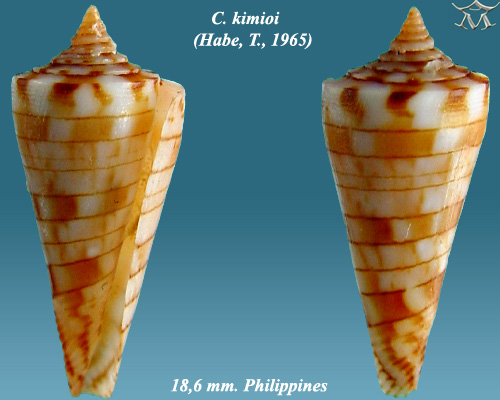
- Apertural and abapertural views of shell of Conasprella kimioi (Habe, T., 1965)
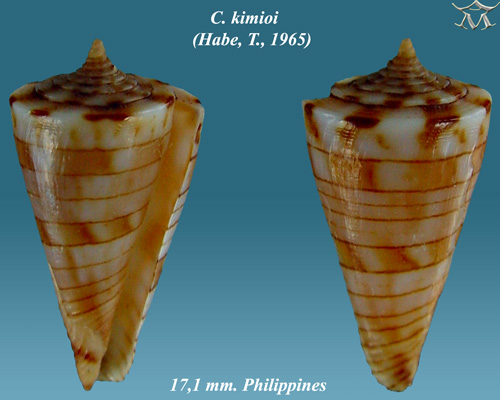

Scientific classification
- Kingdom: Animalia
- Phylum: Mollusca
- Class: Gastropoda
- Subclass: Caenogastropoda
- Order: Neogastropoda
- Superfamily: Conoidea
- Family: Conidae
- Genus: Conasprella
- Species: C. kimioi

Binomial name
- Conasprella kimioi (Habe, 1965)

Synonyms
- Conasprella (Boucheticonus) kimioi (Habe, 1965) · accepted, alternate representation; Conus kimioi (Habe, 1965); Duodenticonus kimioi (Habe, 1965); Rhizoconus kimioi Habe, 1965 (original combination); Yeddoconus kimioi (Habe, 1965)

= Conasprella kimioi =

Species of gastropod

Conasprella kimioi commonly known as Kimio's Cone, is a small species of sea snail, a marine gastropod mollusk in the family Conidae, the cone snails and their allies.

Like all species within the genus Conasprella, these snails are predatory and venomous. They are capable of stinging humans, therefore live ones should be handled carefully or not at all.

== Description ==
The size of the shell varies between 13 mm and 23 mm.

Their functional type is benthos.

Their feeding type is predatory.

== Distribution ==
This marine species occurs off Japan to the Philippines; off the Chesterfield Islands, Wallis and Futuna, and New Caledonia.
