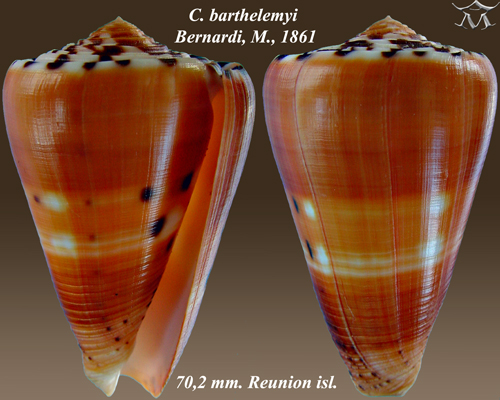
- Apertural and abapertural views of shell of Conus barthelemyi Bernardi, M., 1861

Conservation status
- Least Concern (IUCN 3.1)

Scientific classification
- Kingdom: Animalia
- Phylum: Mollusca
- Class: Gastropoda
- Subclass: Caenogastropoda
- Order: Neogastropoda
- Superfamily: Conoidea
- Family: Conidae
- Genus: Conus
- Species: C. barthelemyi

Binomial name
- Conus barthelemyi Bernardi, 1861

Synonyms
- Conus (Pionoconus) barthelemyi Bernardi, 1861 accepted, alternate representation; Conus paradiseus Shikama, 1977; Pionoconus barthelemyi (Bernardi, 1861); Rhizoconus paradiseus Shikama, T., 1977

= Conus barthelemyi =

Species of sea snail

Conus barthelemyi, common name the Barthelemy's cone, is a species of sea snail, a marine gastropod mollusk in the family Conidae, the cone snails and their allies.

Like all species within the genus Conus, these snails are predatory and venomous. They are capable of stinging humans, therefore live ones should be handled carefully or not at all.

== Description ==
The size of the shell varies between 42 mm and 84 mm.

== Distribution ==
This species occurs in the Indian Ocean off Reunion island, Chagos and the Mascarene Basin. It has been spotted at Mayotte too (August 2022).

== Gallery ==
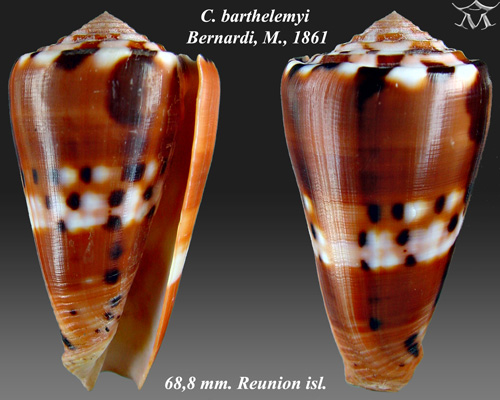
Conus barthelemyi Bernardi, M., 1861

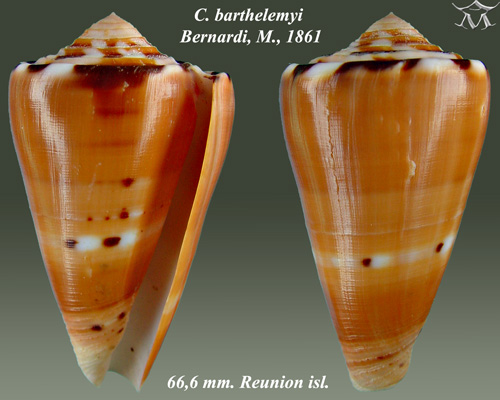
Conus barthelemyi Bernardi, M., 1861

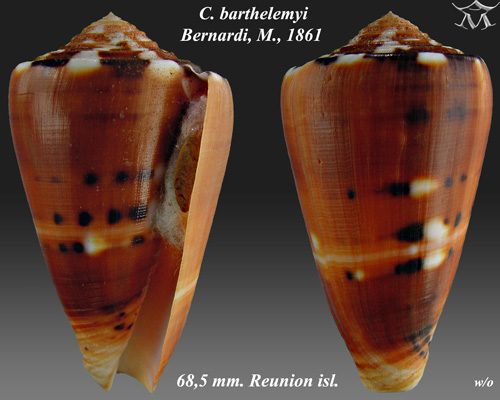
Conus barthelemyi Bernardi, M., 1861

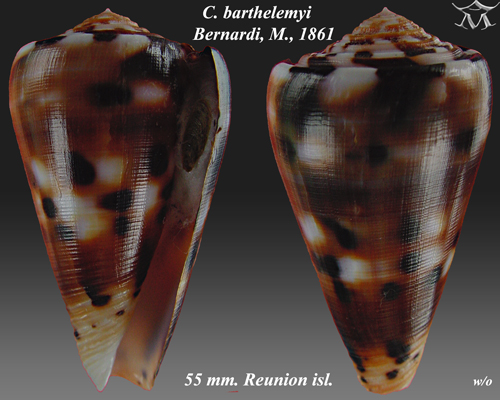
Conus barthelemyi Bernardi, M., 1861
