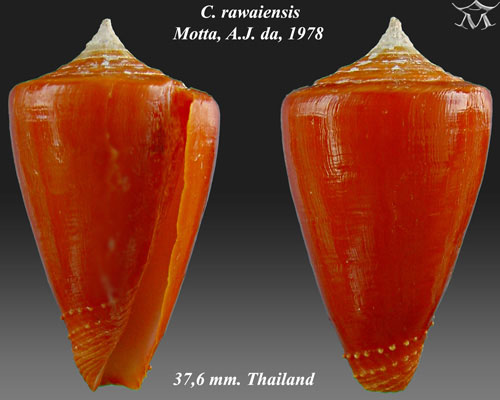
- Apertural and abapertural views of shell of Conus rawaiensis Motta, A.J. da, 1978
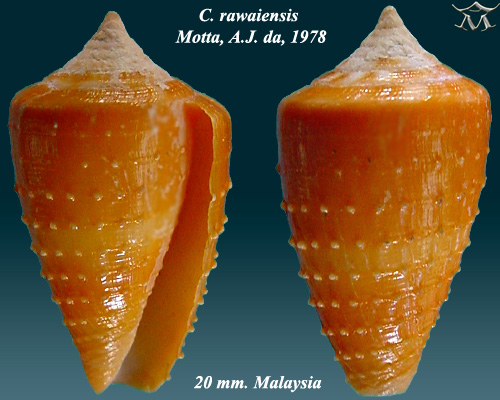

Conservation status
- Vulnerable (IUCN 3.1)

Scientific classification
- Kingdom: Animalia
- Phylum: Mollusca
- Class: Gastropoda
- Subclass: Caenogastropoda
- Order: Neogastropoda
- Superfamily: Conoidea
- Family: Conidae
- Genus: Conus
- Species: C. rawaiensis

Binomial name
- Conus rawaiensis da Motta, 1978

Synonyms
- Conus (Rhizoconus) rawaiensis da Motta, 1978 · accepted, alternate representation; Rhizoconus rawaiensis (da Motta, 1978)

= Conus rawaiensis =

Species of sea snail

Conus rawaiensis is a species of sea snail, a marine gastropod mollusk in the family Conidae, the cone snails and their allies.

Like all species within the genus Conus, these snails are predatory and venomous. They are capable of stinging humans, therefore live ones should be handled carefully or not at all.

== Description ==
The size of the shell varies between 19 mm and 48 mm.

== Distribution ==
This marine species occurs off Western Thailand and off Sri Lanka.
