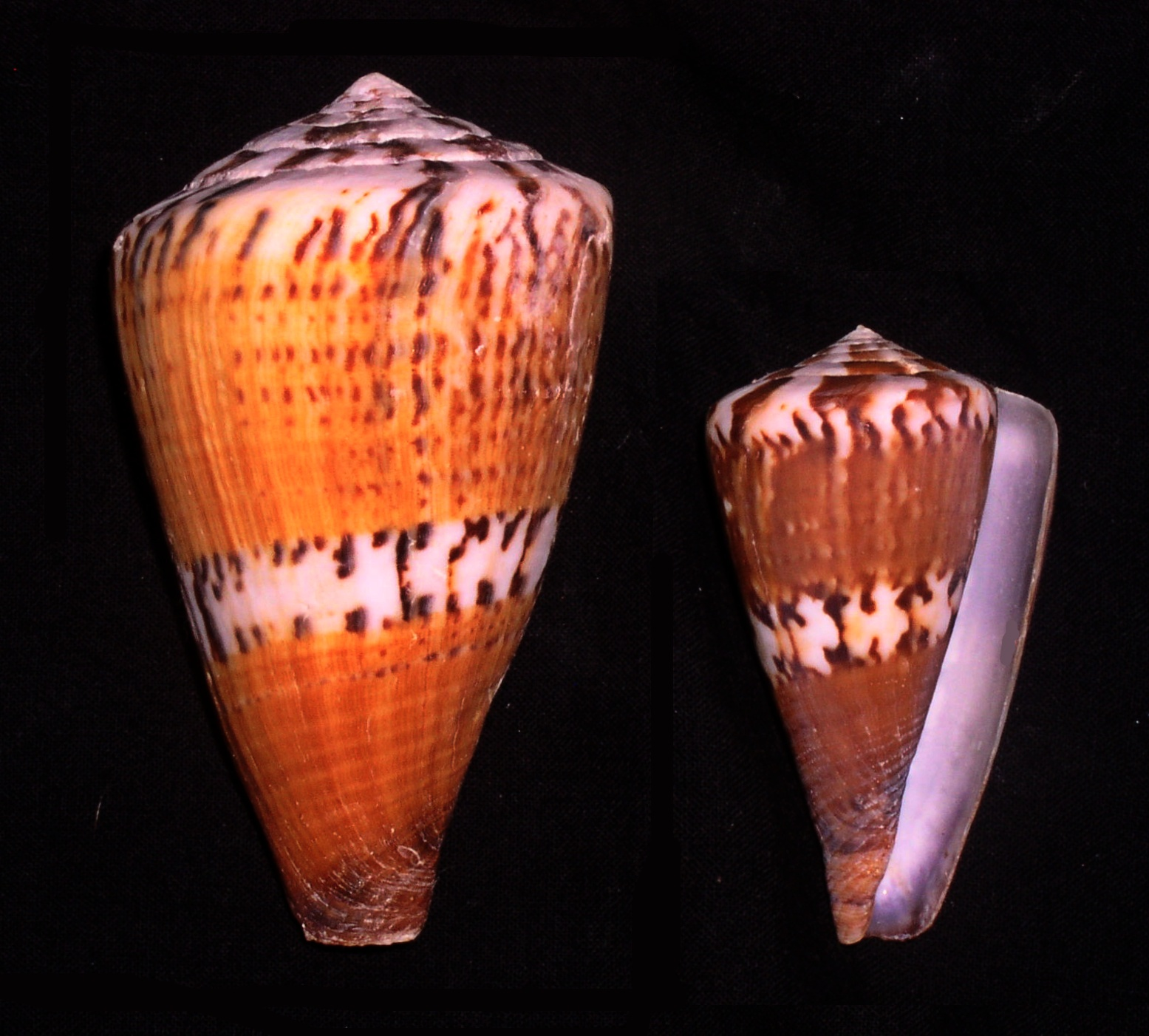

Conservation status
- Least Concern (IUCN 3.1)

Scientific classification
- Kingdom: Animalia
- Phylum: Mollusca
- Class: Gastropoda
- Subclass: Caenogastropoda
- Order: Neogastropoda
- Superfamily: Conoidea
- Family: Conidae
- Genus: Conus
- Species: C. capitaneus

Binomial name
- Conus capitaneus Linnaeus, 1758

Synonyms
- Conus capitaneus var. virgineus Wils, 1972 (unavailable name); Conus classarius Hwass in Bruguière, 1792 (nomen dubium); Conus (Rhizoconus) capitaneus Linnaeus, 1758 accepted, alternate representation; Conus ceciliae Crosse, 1858; Rhizoconus capitaneus Linnaeus, 1758

= Conus capitaneus =

Species of sea snail

Conus capitaneus, common name the captain cone, is a species of sea snail, a marine gastropod mollusk in the family Conidae, the cone snails and their allies.

Like all species within the genus Conus, these snails are predatory and venomous. They are capable of stinging humans, therefore live ones should be handled carefully or not at all.

== Description ==
The size of an adult shell varies between 50 mm and 98 mm. Its low spire is striate, flamed with chocolate and white. The body whorl is yellowish, or orange-brown, encircled by rows of chestnut dots, usually stained chocolate at the base. There is a central white band, with chocolate hieroglyphic markings on either side, and a shoulder-band, crossed by chocolate smaller longitudinal markings. The aperture is white.

== Distribution ==
This marine species occurs in the Indian Ocean off Madagascar, the Mascarene Basin, Mauritius and Tanzania; and in the Indo-West Pacific (off Hawaii, Samoa, Tonga, Japan); off Australia (New South Wales, Northern Territory, Queensland, Western Australia),

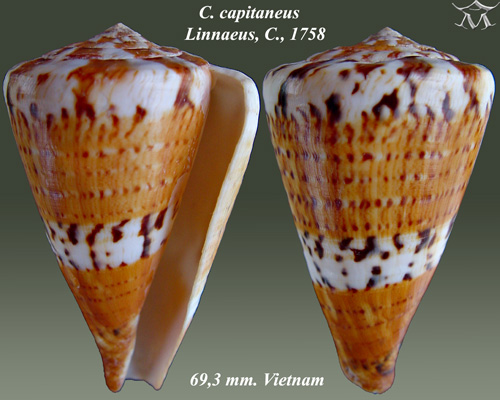
Conus capitaneus Linnaeus, C., 1758

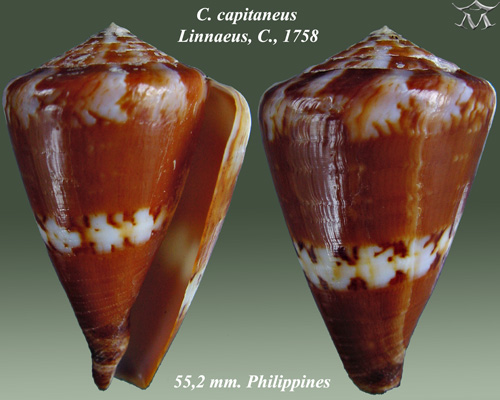
Conus capitaneus Linnaeus, C., 1758

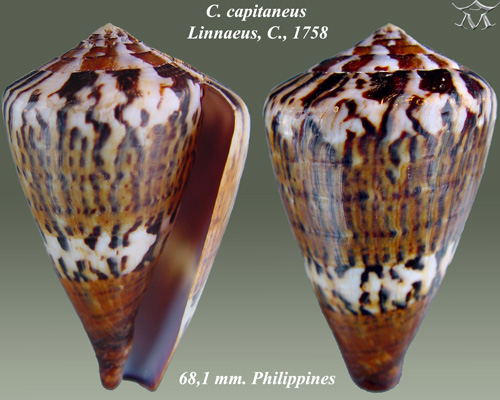
Conus capitaneus Linnaeus, C., 1758

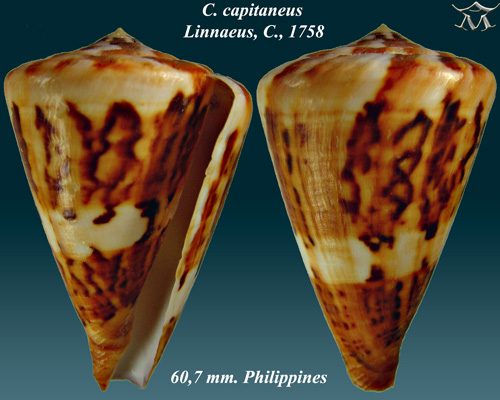
Conus capitaneus Linnaeus, C., 1758
