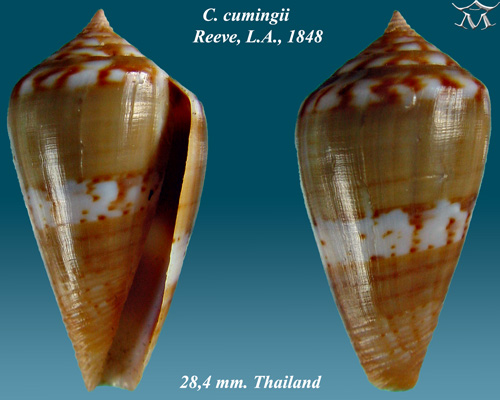
- Apertural and abapertural views of shell of Conus cumingii Reeve, L.A., 1848
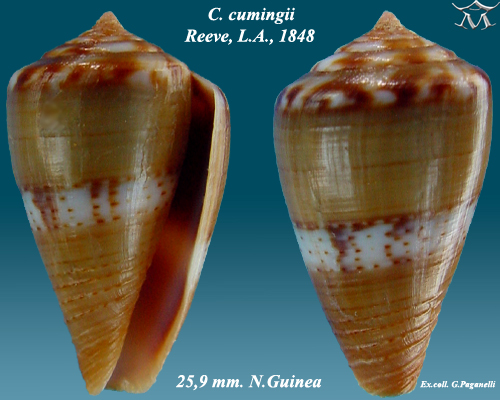

Conservation status
- Least Concern (IUCN 3.1)

Scientific classification
- Kingdom: Animalia
- Phylum: Mollusca
- Class: Gastropoda
- Subclass: Caenogastropoda
- Order: Neogastropoda
- Superfamily: Conoidea
- Family: Conidae
- Genus: Conus
- Species: C. cumingii

Binomial name
- Conus cumingii Reeve, 1848

Synonyms
- Conus (Rhizoconus) cumingii Reeve, 1848 · accepted, alternate representation; Rhizoconus cumingii (Reeve, 1848)

= Conus cumingii =

Species of sea snail

Conus cumingii, common name Cuming's cone, is a species of sea snail, a marine gastropod mollusk in the family Conidae, the cone snails and their allies.

Like all species within the genus Conus, these snails are predatory and venomous. They are capable of stinging humans, therefore live ones should be handled carefully or not at all.

This species is not to be confused with Conus cumingii Reeve, L.A., 1849, an invalid junior homonym and synonym of Conus virgatus Reeve, 1849 .

== Description ==
The size of the shell varies between 20 mm and 40 mm.

== Distribution ==
This marine species occurs off India, Sri Lanka, Western Thailand, Indonesia, the Southern Philippines and the Solomon Islands.
