= Conus peli =

Scientific classification
- Kingdom: Animalia
- Phylum: Mollusca
- Class: Gastropoda
- Subclass: Caenogastropoda
- Order: Neogastropoda
- Superfamily: Conoidea
- Family: Conidae
- Genus: Conus
- Species: C. peli

Binomial name
- Conus peli Moolenbeek, 1996

Synonyms
- Conus (Rhizoconus) peli Moolenbeek, 1996 · accepted, alternate representation; Rhizoconus peli (Moolenbeek, 1996)

Species of sea snail

Conus peli is a species of sea snail, a marine gastropod mollusk in the family Conidae, the cone snails and their allies.

Like all species within the genus Conus, these snails are predatory and venomous. They are capable of stinging humans, therefore live ones should be handled carefully or not at all.

== Description ==
The size of the shell attains 64 mm.

== Distribution ==
This marine species occurs off Oman.
