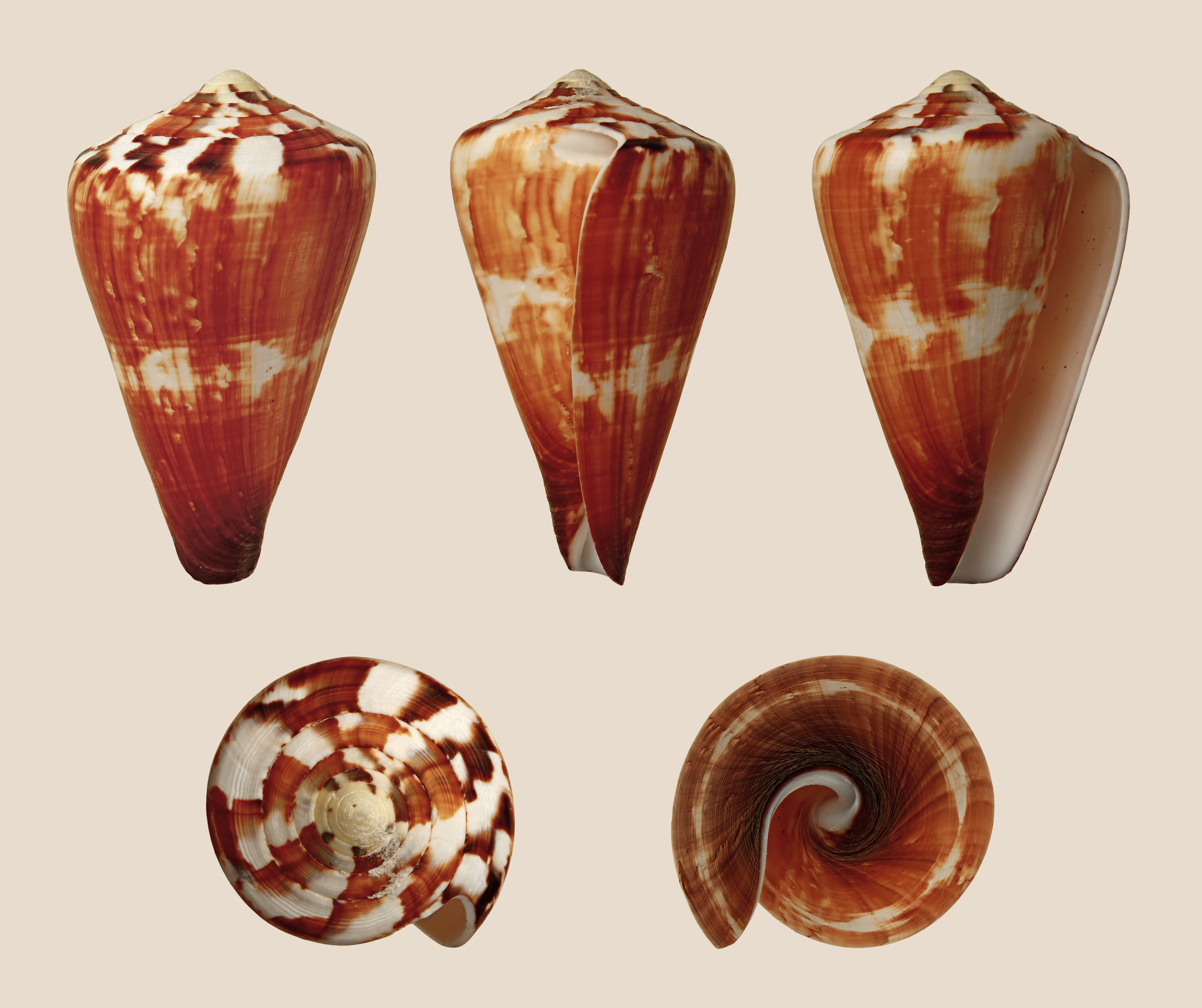
- Shell of Conus vexillum Gmelin, 1791

Conservation status
- Least Concern (IUCN 3.1)

Scientific classification
- Kingdom: Animalia
- Phylum: Mollusca
- Class: Gastropoda
- Subclass: Caenogastropoda
- Order: Neogastropoda
- Superfamily: Conoidea
- Family: Conidae
- Genus: Conus
- Species: C. vexillum

Binomial name
- Conus vexillum Gmelin, 1791

Synonyms
- Conus (Rhizoconus) vexillum Gmelin, 1791 · accepted, alternate representation; Conus leopardus Dillwyn, 1817; Conus nivifer G.B. Sowerby I, 1833; Conus robillardi Bernardi, 1858; Conus sulphuratus Kiener, 1845; Conus sumatrensis Hwass in Bruguière, 1792; Conus vexillum sumatrensis Hwass in Bruguière, 1792; Cucullus canonicus Röding, 1798 (junior secondary homonym of Conus canonicus Hwass in Bruguière, 1792); Rhizoconus robillardi Bernardi, 1858; Rhizoconus vexillum (Gmelin, 1791)

= Conus vexillum =

Species of sea snail

Conus vexillum, common name the vexillum cone or the flag cone, is a species of sea snail, a marine gastropod mollusk in the family Conidae, the cone snails and their allies.

These snails are predatory and venomous. They are capable of stinging humans, therefore alive ones should be handled carefully or not at all.

== Description ==
The size of the shell varies between 27 and 186 millimetres (1.1 and 7.3 in). The shell is large and rather thin. The spire is striate. The color of the shell is yellowish or chestnut, with an irregular white central band, sometimes obsolete, and occasionally another interrupted band at the shoulder. The spire is variegated with white and chestnut broad flames, the latter often overlaying also the lighter chestnut of the body whorl.

== Distribution ==
The species is found across the entire Indo-Pacific from Natal to Hawaii and French Polynesia and Japan to Australia (Northern Territory, Queensland, Western Australia). The subspecies Conus vexillium sumatrensis is restricted to the northwest Indian Ocean.

== Habitat and Ecology ==
Juveniles of this species are present on intertidal benches whereas adults will occur along subtidal reefs to about 30 metres (98 ft). Individuals that are present around the Hawaiian Islands occur between 50–70 m (160–230 ft). There have been sightings of this species in shallow water, lagoon pinnacles, sand, sand with gravel, among weed or rocks and under dead coral. It is said to be able to withstand rough waters. The species feeds on eunicid polychaetes.

== Gallery ==
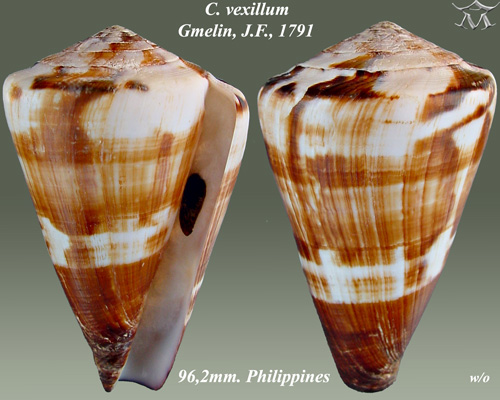
Conus vexillum Gmelin, J.F., 1791

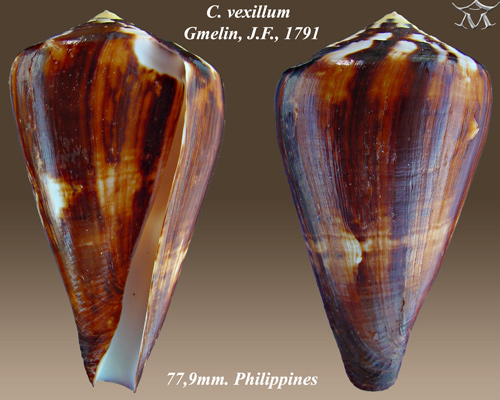
Conus vexillum Gmelin, J.F., 1791

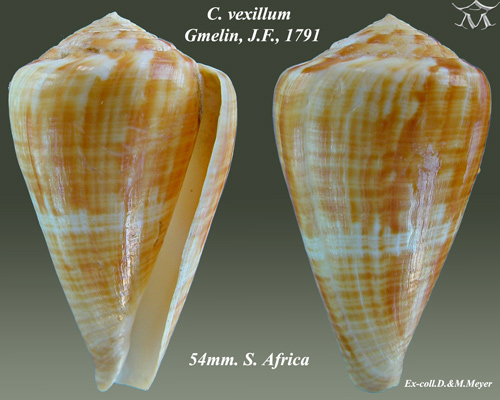
Conus vexillum Gmelin, J.F., 1791
