= Christian Hee Hwass =

Danish zoologist

Christian Hee Hwass (1731–1803) was a Danish malacologist who is remembered for his work in conchology.

Although he was born in Denmark, Hwass did most of his important work in France. He moved to Paris in 1780 and later to Auteuil in 1794. In France, he collaborated with famous scientists Jean-Baptiste Lamarck (1744–1829) and Heinrich Christian Friedrich Schumacher (1757–1830), a fellow Dane on a research trip in Paris during the 1780s.

Hwass is remembered for amassing a large shell collection that included numerous rare specimens. Many European scientists used the collection as a reference work for their personal publications. Hwass's best-known written work was the 1792 publication of Encyclopedie Methodique. Although his friend, Jean Guillaume Bruguière (1750–1798), is often credited as author of the encyclopedia, the majority of the work was done by Hwass.
