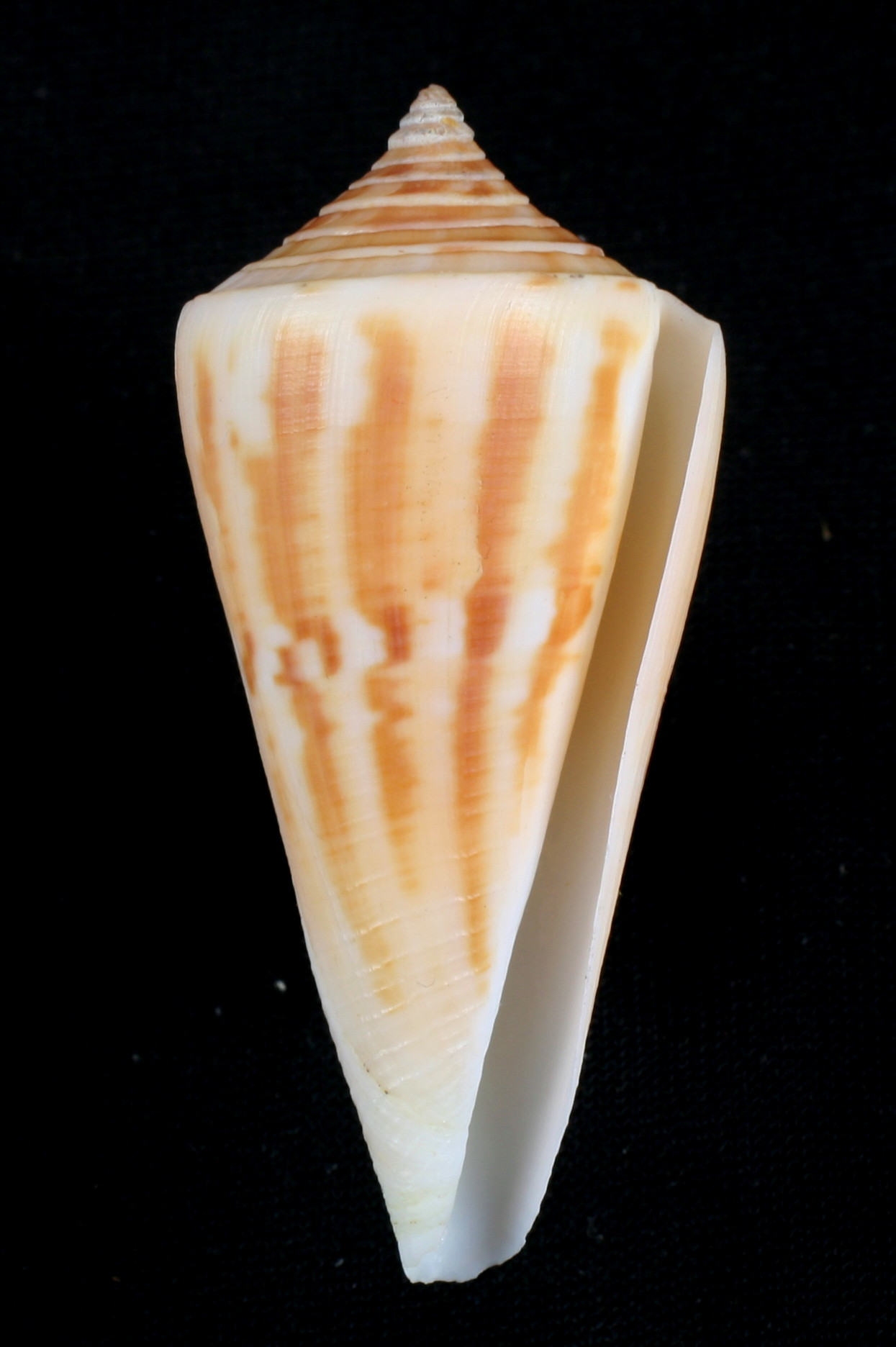
- Apertural view of shell of Dauciconus virgatus (Reeve, 1849)

Scientific classification
- Kingdom: Animalia
- Phylum: Mollusca
- Class: Gastropoda
- Subclass: Caenogastropoda
- Order: Neogastropoda
- Family: Conidae
- Genus: Conus
- Subgenus: Dauciconus; Cotton, 1945

Type species
- Conus daucus Hwass in Bruguière, 1792

Synonyms
- Cariboconus Petuch, 2003; Conasprelloides Tucker & Tenorio, 2009; Dauciconus Cotton, 1945; Gradiconus da Motta, 1991; Magelliconus da Motta,1991; Poremskiconus Petuch, 2013; Purpuriconus da Motta, 1991; Tuckericonus Petuch 2013

= Conus (Dauciconus) =

Subgenus of gastropods

Dauciconus is a subgenus of sea snails, marine gastropod mollusks in the genus Conus, family Conidae, the cone snails and their allies.

In the new classification of the family Conidae by Puillandre N., Duda T.F., Meyer C., Olivera B.M. & Bouchet P. (2015), Dauciconus has become a subgenus of Conus: Conus (Dauciconus) Tucker & Tenorio, 2013 represented as Conus Linnaeus, 1758

== Distinguishing characteristics ==
The Tucker & Tenorio 2009 taxonomy distinguishes Dauciconus from Conus in the following ways:

- Genus Conus sensu stricto Linnaeus, 1758

Shell characters (living and fossil species)

The basic shell shape is conical to elongated conical, has a deep anal notch on the shoulder, a smooth periostracum and a small operculum. The shoulder of the shell is usually nodulose and the protoconch is usually multispiral. Markings often include the presence of tents except for black or white color variants, with the absence of spiral lines of minute tents and textile bars.

Radular tooth (not known for fossil species)

The radula has an elongated anterior section with serrations and a large exposed terminating cusp, a non-obvious waist, blade is either small or absent and has a short barb, and lacks a basal spur.

Geographical distribution

These species are found in the Indo-Pacific region.

Feeding habits

These species eat other gastropods including cones.

- Genus Dauciconus Cotton, 1945

Shell characters (living and fossil species)

The shell is conical to elongate conical in shape. The protoconch is multispiral with 2.5 whorls, and the whorl tops are often concave and nodules usually do not persist on later whorls. The anal notch is deep to moderately deep. The periostracum is tufted, and the operculum is small to medium sized.

Radular tooth (not known for fossil species)

The anterior section of the radula is roughly equal to the posterior section. The blade is fairly long and covers at least half the length of the anterior section of the radular tooth. A basal spur is present, and the barb is short. The radular tooth has serrations and the terminating cusp is internal.

Geographical distribution

These species are found in the West Atlantic and Eastern Pacific regions.

Feeding habits

These species are presumed to be vermivorous (meaning that they prey on marine worms) based upon the aspect of the radular tooth.

== Species list ==
The following species names are recognized as "alternate representations" (see full explanation below) in contrast to the traditional system, which uses the genus Conus for all species in the family:

- Dauciconus abrolhosensis Petuch, 1987: synonym of Conus (Dauciconus) abrolhosensis Petuch, 1987, represented as Conus abrolhosensis Petuch, 1987
- Dauciconus alainallaryi Bozzetti & Monnier, 2009: synonym of Conus (Dauciconus) alainallaryi Bozzetti & Monnier, 2009, represented as Conus alainallaryi Bozzetti & Monnier, 2009
- Dauciconus amphiurgus (Dall, 1889): synonym of Conus amphiurgus Dall, 1889
- Dauciconus anabathrum (Crosse, 1865): synonym of Conus anabathrum Crosse, 1865
- Dauciconus arangoi Sarasúa, 1977: synonym of Conus (Dauciconus) arangoi Sarasúa, 1977, represented as Conus arangoi Sarasúa, 1977
- Dauciconus aureonimbosus (Petuch, 1987): synonym of Conus aureonimbosus Petuch, 1987
- Dauciconus bayeri Petuch, 1987: synonym of Conus (Dauciconus) bayeri Petuch, 1987, represented as Conus bayeri Petuch, 1987
- Daucionus belizeanus (Petuch & Sargent, 2011): synonym of Conus (Dauciconus) belizeanus (Petuch & Sargent, 2011), represented as Conus belizeanus (Petuch & Sargent, 2011)
- Dauciconus bessei Petuch, 1992: synonym of Conus (Dauciconus) bessei Petuch, 1992, represented as Conus bessei Petuch, 1992
- Dauciconus boui (da Motta, 1988): synonym of Conus (Dauciconus) boui da Motta, 1988 represented as Conus boui da Motta, 1988
- Dauciconus burryae (Clench, 1942): synonym of Conus anabathrum burryae Clench, 1942: synonym of Conus burryae Clench, 1942
- Dauciconus colombi Monnier & Limpalaër, 2012: synonym of Conus (Dauciconus) colombi (Monnier & Limpalaër, 2012) represented as Conus colombi (Monnier & Limpalaër, 2012)
- Dauciconus daucus (Hwass in Bruguière, 1792): synonym of Conus daucus Hwass in Bruguière, 1792
- Dauciconus eversoni (Petuch, 1987): synonym of Conus eversoni Petuch, 1987
- Dauciconus fenzani Petuch & Sargent, 2011: synonym of Conasprella fenzani (Petuch & Sargent, 2011)
- Dauciconus flammeacolor (Petuch, 1992): synonym of Conus flammeacolor Petuch, 1992
- Dauciconus glicksteini (Petuch, 1987): synonym of Conus glicksteini Petuch, 1987
- Dauciconus goajira (Petuch, 1992): synonym of Conus (Dauciconus) goajira Petuch, 1992 represented as Conus goajira Petuch, 1992
- Dauciconus hennequini (Petuch, 1993): synonym of Conus (Dauciconus) hennequini Petuch, 1993 represented as Conus hennequini Petuch, 1993
- Dauciconus honkeri (Petuch, 1988): synonym of Conus honkeri Petuch, 1988
- Dauciconus jorioi Petuch, 2013: synonym of Conus (Dauciconus) jorioi (Petuch, 2013) represented as Conus jorioi (Petuch, 2013)
- Dauciconus kaiserae Tenorio, Tucker & Chaney, 2012: synonym of Conus (Dauciconus) kaiserae (Tenorio, Tucker & Chaney, 2012) represented as Conus kaiserae (Tenorio, Tucker & Chaney, 2012)
- Dauciconus lightbourni (Petuch, 1986): synonym of Conus lightbourni Petuch, 1986
- Dauciconus maya (Petuch & Sargent, 2011): synonym of Conus (Dauciconus) maya (Petuch & Sargent, 2011) represented as Conus maya (Petuch & Sargent, 2011)
- Dauciconus parascalaris (Petuch, 1987): synonym of Conus parascalaris Petuch, 1987
- Dauciconus poormani (Berry, 1968): synonym of Conus poormani Berry, 1968
- Dauciconus portobeloensis (Petuch, 1990): synonym of Conus portobeloensis Petuch, 1990
- Dauciconus poulosi (Petuch, 1993): synonym of Conus poulosi Petuch, 1993
- Dauciconus sanderi (Wils & Moolenbeek, 1979): synonym of Conus sanderi Wils & Moolenbeek, 1979
- Dauciconus shaskyi Tenorio, Tucker & Chaney, 2012: synonym of Conus (Dauciconus) shaskyi (Tenorio, Tucker & Chaney, 2012) represented as Conus shaskyi (Tenorio, Tucker & Chaney, 2012)
- Dauciconus vikingorum (Petuch, 1993): synonym of Conus (Dauciconus) vikingorum Petuch, 1993 represented as Conus vikingorum Petuch, 1993
- Dauciconus virgatus (Reeve, 1849): synonym of Conus virgatus Reeve, 1849
- Dauciconus worki (Petuch, 1998): synonym of Conus worki Petuch, 1998
- Dauciconus xanthicus (Dall, 1910): synonym of Conus xanthicus Dall, 1910
