= Conus (Attenuiconus) =

Scientific classification
- Kingdom: Animalia
- Phylum: Mollusca
- Class: Gastropoda
- Subclass: Caenogastropoda
- Order: Neogastropoda
- Family: Conidae
- Genus: Conus
- Subgenus: Attenuiconus; Petuch, 2013

Type species
- Conus attenuatus Reeve, 1844

Synonyms
- Attenuiconus Petuch, 2013

Subgenus of gastropods

Attenuiconus is a taxon of sea snails, marine gastropod mollusks in the family Conidae. Although formerly described as a distinct subgenus, it is currently considered as an alternative representation of the cone snail genus, Conus.

== Species ==
All the species formerly classified in the subgenus Attenuiconus are now considered as "alternate representations" of species in the genus Conus:

- Conus (Attenuiconus) attenuatus Reeve, 1844 represented as Conus attenuatus Reeve, 1844
- Conus (Attenuiconus) aureonimbosus Petuch, 1987 represented as Conus aureonimbosus Petuch, 1987
- Conus (Attenuiconus) eversoni Petuch, 1987 represented as Conus eversoni Petuch, 1987
- Conus (Attenuiconus) honkeri Petuch, 1988 represented as Conus honkeri Petuch, 1988
- Conus (Attenuiconus) marileeae (Harasewych, 2014) represented as Conus marileeae (Harasewych, 2014)
- Conus (Attenuiconus) poulosi Petuch, 1993, represented as Conus poulosi Petuch, 1993

Species brought into synonymy

- Attenuiconus ignotus (Cargile, 1998): synonym of Conus ignotus Cargile, 1998
