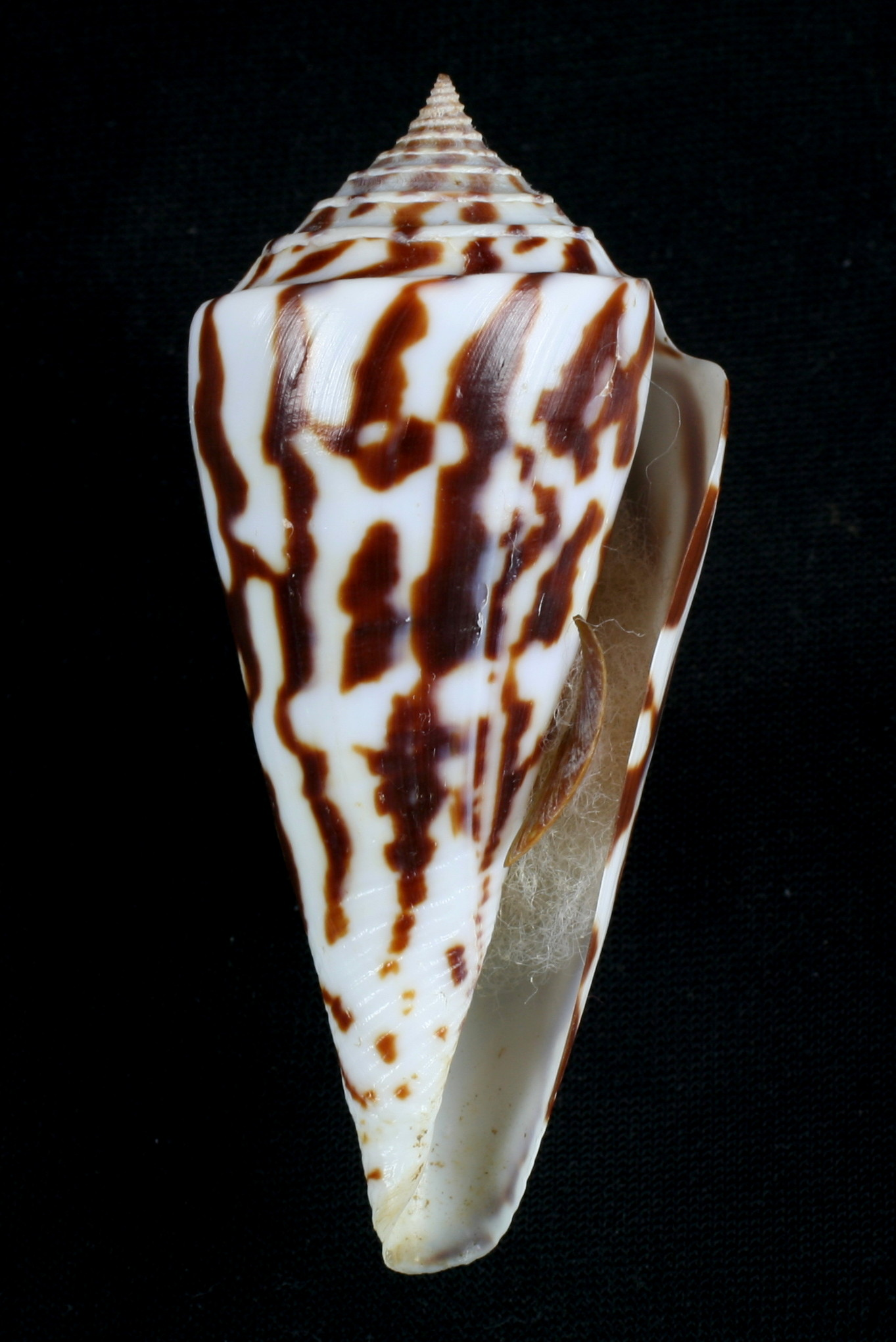
- Apertural view of shell of Conasprella emarginata (Reeve, 1844), with operculum, measuring 80.0 mm in height, collected in the Bay of Chiriqui, Panama.

Scientific classification
- Kingdom: Animalia
- Phylum: Mollusca
- Class: Gastropoda
- Subclass: Caenogastropoda
- Order: Neogastropoda
- Family: Conidae
- Genus: Conasprella
- Subgenus: Kohniconus; Tucker & Tenorio, 2009

Synonyms
- Kohniconus J. K. Tucker & M. Tenorio, 2009

= Conasprella (Kohniconus) =

Subgenus of gastropods

Kohniconus is a subgenus of sea snails, marine gastropod molluscs in the genus Conasprella, family Conidae, the cone snails and their allies.

This subgenus was named in honor of Alan J. Kohn, the cone shell authority.

In the new classification of the family Conidae by Puillandre N., Duda T.F., Meyer C., Olivera B.M. & Bouchet P. (2015), Kohniconus has become a subgenus of Conasprella: Conasprella (Kohniconus) Tucker & Tenorio, 2009 represented as Conasprella Thiele, 1929

== Distinguishing characteristics ==
The Tucker & Tenorio 2009 taxonomy distinguishes Kohniconus from Conus in the following ways:

- Genus Conus sensu stricto Linnaeus, 1758

Shell characters (living and fossil species)

The basic shell shape is conical to elongated conical, has a deep anal notch on the shoulder, a smooth periostracum and a small operculum. The shoulder of the shell is usually nodulose and the protoconch is usually multispiral. Markings often include the presence of tents except for black or white color variants, with the absence of spiral lines of minute tents and textile bars.

Radular tooth (not known for fossil species)

The radula has an elongated anterior section with serrations and a large exposed terminating cusp, a non-obvious waist, blade is either small or absent and has a short barb, and lacks a basal spur.

Geographical distribution

These species are found in the Indo-Pacific region.

Feeding habits

These species eat other gastropods including cones.

- Subgenus Kohniconus Tucker & Tenorio, 2009

Shell characters (living and fossil species)

The shell is turbinate in shape. The protoconch is multispiral. The shell is ornamented with cords and nodules which may persist or become obsolete. The anal notch is deep. The periostracum is smooth, and the operculum is large.

Radular tooth (not known for fossil species)

The anterior section of the radular tooth is much shorter than the posterior section, and a short blade is present. A basal spur is present, and the barb is short. The shaft fold is blunt at the anterior end.

Geographical distribution

The species in this genus occur in the West Atlantic and Eastern Pacific regions.

Feeding habits

The species in this genus are vermivorous (meaning that these snails prey on marine worms).

== Species list ==
This list of species is based on the information in the World Register of Marine Species (WoRMS) list. Species within the genus Kohniconus include:

- Kohniconus arcuatus (Broderip & G.B. Sowerby I, 1829): synonym of Conasprella arcuata( Broderip & G. B. Sowerby I, 1829) (alternate representation)
- Kohniconus centurio (Born, 1778): synonym of Conasprella centurio (Born, 1778) (alternate representation)
- Kohniconus delessertii (Récluz, 1843): synonym of Conasprella delessertii Récluz, 1843 (alternate representation)
- Kohniconus emarginatus (Reeve, 1844): synonym of Conasprella emarginata Reeve, 1844 (alternate representation)
- Kohniconus fenzani (Petuch & Sargent, 2011) synonym of Conasprella fenzani (alternate representation)
- Kohniconus janowskyae Tucker & Tenorio, 2011 synonym of Conasprella janowskyae (alternate representation)
- Kohniconus kohni (McLean & Nybakken, 1979): synonym of Conasprella kohni McLean & Nybakken, 1979 (alternate representation)
- Kohniconus rachelae (Petuch, 1988): synonym of Conasprella rachelae Petuch, 1988 (alternate representation)
- Kohniconus scariphus (Dall, 1910)= synonym of Conasprella scaripha Dall, 1910 (alternate representation)

== Significance of "alternative representation" ==
Prior to 2009, all cone species were placed within the family Conidae and were placed in one genus, Conus. In 2009 however, J.K. Tucker and M.J. Tenorio proposed a classification system for the over 600 recognized species that were in the family. Their classification proposed 3 distinct families and 82 genera for the living species of cone snails, including the family Conilithidae. This classification was based upon shell morphology, radular differences, anatomy, physiology, cladistics, with comparisons to molecular (DNA) studies. Published accounts of genera within the Conidae (or Conilithidae) that include the genus Kohniconus include J.K. Tucker & M.J. Tenorio (2009), and Bouchet et al. (2011).

Testing in order to try to understand the molecular phylogeny of the Conidae was initially begun by Christopher Meyer and Alan Kohn, and is continuing, particularly with the advent of nuclear DNA testing in addition to mDNA testing.

However, in 2011, some experts still use the traditional classification, where all species are placed in Conus within the single family Conidae: for example, according to the current November 2011 version of the World Register of Marine Species, all species within the family Conidae are in the genus Conus. The binomial names of species in the 82 cone snail genera listed in Tucker & Tenorio 2009 are recognized by the World Register of Marine Species as "alternative representations." Debate within the scientific community regarding continues, and additional molecular phylogeny studies are being carried out in an attempt to clarify the issue.

All this has been superseded in 2015 by the new classification of the Conidae
