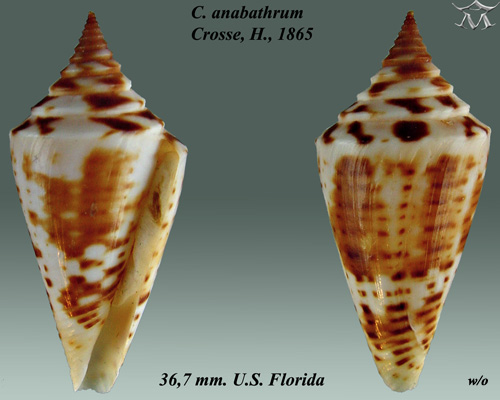
- Apertural and abapertural views of shell of Conus anabathrum Crosse, H., 1865

Conservation status
- Vulnerable (IUCN 3.1)

Scientific classification
- Kingdom: Animalia
- Phylum: Mollusca
- Class: Gastropoda
- Subclass: Caenogastropoda
- Order: Neogastropoda
- Superfamily: Conoidea
- Family: Conidae
- Genus: Conus
- Species: C. anabathrum

Binomial name
- Conus anabathrum Crosse, 1865

Synonyms
- Conus (Dauciconus) anabathrum Crosse, 1865 · accepted, alternate representation; Conus anabathrum anabathrum Crosse, 1865 · accepted, alternate representation; Conus aureolus G.B. Sowerby II, 1858; Conus floridanus Gabb, 1869; Conus floridanus burryae Clench, 1942; Conus floridanus tranthami Petuch, 1995; Conus floridensis G. B. Sowerby II, 1870; Dauciconus anabathrum (Crosse, 1865); Gradiconus anabathrum (Crosse, 1865); Gradiconus anabathrum anabathrum (Crosse, 1865)

= Conus anabathrum =

Species of sea snail

Conus anabathrum is a species of sea snail, a marine gastropod mollusk in the family Conidae, the cone snails and their allies.

Like all species within the genus Conus, these snails are predatory and venomous. They are capable of stinging humans, therefore live ones should be handled carefully or not at all.

There are three subspecies :

- Conus anabathrum anabathrum Crosse, 1865: alternate representation of Conus anabathrum
- Conus anabathrum antoni Cargile, 2011: synonym of Conus burryae Clench, 1942
- Сonus anabathrum tranthami Petuch, 1998: synonym of Gradiconus anabathrum tranthami (Petuch, 1998) accepted as Conus burryae Clench, 1942

== Distribution ==
This species occurs in the Caribbean Sea and the Gulf of Mexico

== Description ==
The maximum recorded shell length is 51 mm. The spire is elevated, and gradate. The body whorl is grooved towards the base. The color of the shell is pale yellowish brown, with a central white band and scattered white maculations, obscurely encircled by lines of light chestnut spots.

== Habitat ==
Minimum recorded depth is 0 m. Maximum recorded depth is 122 m.

== Gallery ==
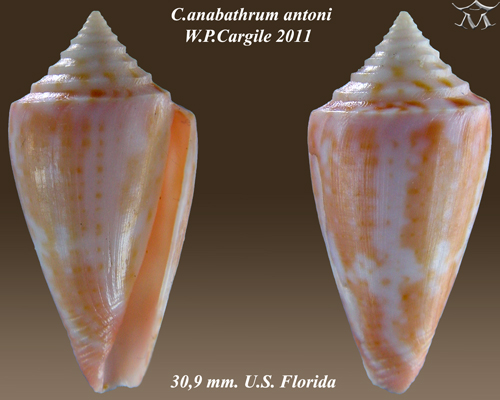
Conus anabathrum antoni W. P. Cargile 2011

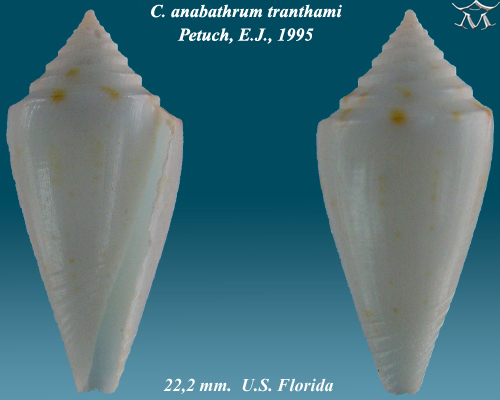
Conus anabathrum tranthami Petuch, E.J., 1995

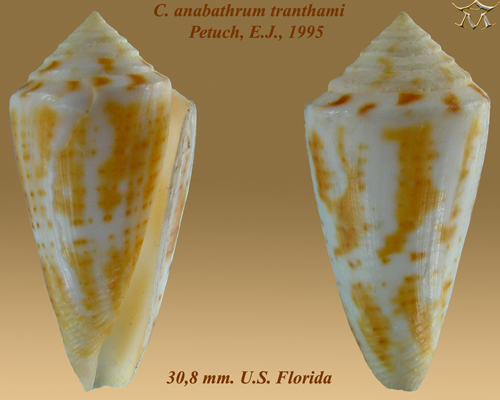
Conus anabathrum tranthami Petuch, E.J., 1995

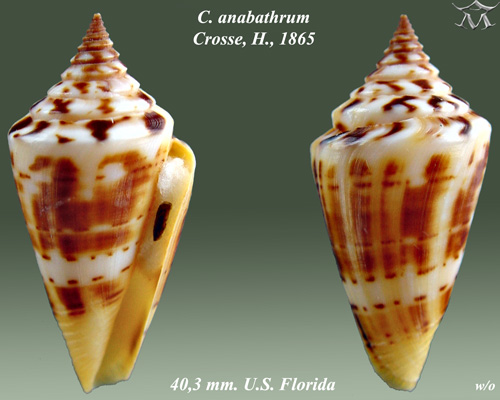
Conus anabathrum Crosse, H., 1865

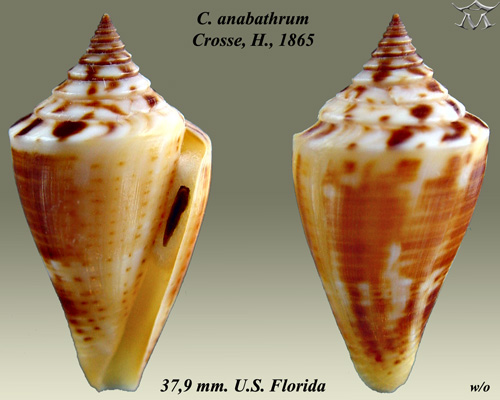
Conus anabathrum Crosse, H., 1865
