= Conus jorioi =

Scientific classification
- Kingdom: Animalia
- Phylum: Mollusca
- Class: Gastropoda
- Subclass: Caenogastropoda
- Order: Neogastropoda
- Superfamily: Conoidea
- Family: Conidae
- Genus: Conus
- Species: C. jorioi

Binomial name
- Conus jorioi (Petuch, 2013)

Synonyms
- Conus (Dauciconus) jorioi (Petuch, 2013) · accepted, alternate representation; Dauciconus jorioi Petuch, 2013

Species of sea snail

Conus jorioi is a species of sea snail, a marine gastropod mollusk in the family Conidae, the cone snails, cone shells or cones.

== Description ==
Predatory and venomous, these snails are capable of stinging humans. Their shell size attains 53 mm.

== Distribution ==
This marine species of cone snail is found in the Atlantic Ocean off Northeastern Brazil.
