= Conus alainallaryi =

Scientific classification
- Kingdom: Animalia
- Phylum: Mollusca
- Class: Gastropoda
- Subclass: Caenogastropoda
- Order: Neogastropoda
- Superfamily: Conoidea
- Family: Conidae
- Genus: Conus
- Species: C. alainallaryi

Binomial name
- Conus alainallaryi Bozzetti & Monnier, 2009

Synonyms
- Conus (Dauciconus) alainallaryi Bozzetti & Monnier, 2009 · accepted, alternate representation; Purpuriconus alainallaryi (Bozzetti & Monnier, 2009)

Species of sea snail

Conus alainallaryi is a species of sea snail, a marine gastropod mollusk in the family Conidae, the cone snails and their allies.

Like all species within the genus Conus, these snails are predatory and venomous. They are capable of stinging humans, therefore live ones should be handled carefully or not at all.

== Description ==
The size of the shell varies between 30 mm and 42 mm.

== Distribution ==
This species occurs in the Caribbean Sea off Colombia.
