= Conus arangoi =

Conservation status
- Least Concern (IUCN 3.1)

Scientific classification
- Kingdom: Animalia
- Phylum: Mollusca
- Class: Gastropoda
- Subclass: Caenogastropoda
- Order: Neogastropoda
- Superfamily: Conoidea
- Family: Conidae
- Genus: Conus
- Species: C. arangoi

Binomial name
- Conus arangoi Sarasúa, 1977

Synonyms
- Conasprella arangoi (Sarasúa, 1977); Conus (Dauciconus) arangoi Sarasúa, 1977 · accepted, alternate representation; Conus abbotti auct. non Clench, 1942; Purpuriconus arangoi (Sarasúa, 1977)

Species of sea snail

Conus arangoi is a species of sea snail, a marine gastropod mollusk in the family Conidae, the cone snails and their allies.

Like all species within the genus Conus, these snails are predatory and venomous. They are capable of stinging humans, therefore live ones should be handled carefully or not at all.

== Distribution ==
This species occurs in the Caribbean Sea and the Gulf of Mexico.

== Description ==
The maximum recorded shell length is 45.5 mm.

== Habitat ==
Minimum recorded depth is 10 m. Maximum recorded depth is 30 m.
