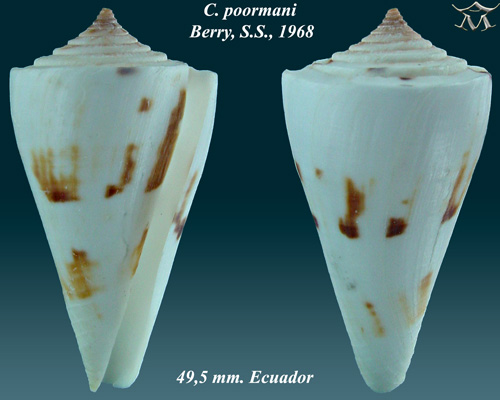
- Apertural and abapertural views of shell of Conus poormani Berry, S.S., 1968
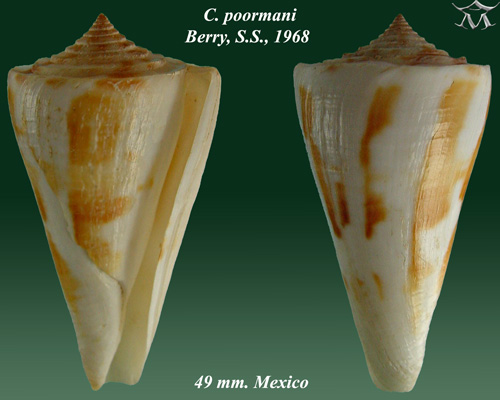

Scientific classification
- Kingdom: Animalia
- Phylum: Mollusca
- Class: Gastropoda
- Subclass: Caenogastropoda
- Order: Neogastropoda
- Superfamily: Conoidea
- Family: Conidae
- Genus: Conus
- Species: C. poormani

Binomial name
- Conus poormani Berry, 1968

Synonyms
- Conus (Dauciconus) poormani Berry, 1968 · accepted, alternate representation; Dauciconus poormani (Berry, 1968)

= Conus poormani =

Species of sea snail

Conus poormani, common name the Poorman's cone, is a species of sea snail, a marine gastropod mollusk in the family Conidae, the cone snails and their allies.

Like all species within the genus Conus, these snails are predatory and venomous. They are capable of stinging humans, therefore live ones should be handled carefully or not at all.

== Description ==
The size of the shell varies between 30 mm and 58 mm.

== Distribution ==
This marine species occurs off the Gulf of California, Western Mexico to Northern Peru.
