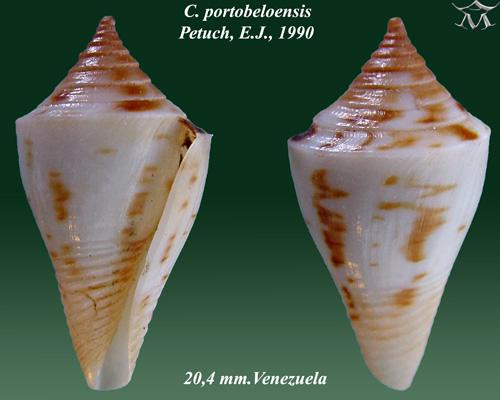
- Apertural and abapertural views of shell of Conus portobeloensis Petuch, E.J., 1990
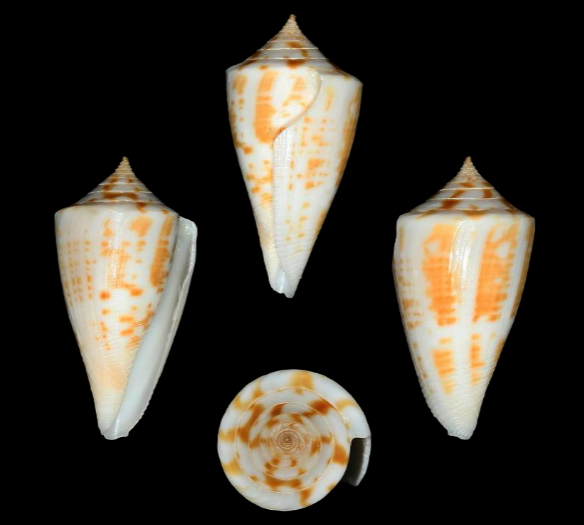

Conservation status
- Least Concern (IUCN 3.1)

Scientific classification
- Kingdom: Animalia
- Phylum: Mollusca
- Class: Gastropoda
- Subclass: Caenogastropoda
- Order: Neogastropoda
- Superfamily: Conoidea
- Family: Conidae
- Genus: Conus
- Species: C. portobeloensis

Binomial name
- Conus portobeloensis Petuch, 1990

Synonyms
- Conus (Dauciconus) portobeloensis Petuch, 1990 · accepted, alternate representation; Dauciconus portobeloensis (Petuch, 1990); Gradiconus portobeloensis (Petuch, 1990)

= Conus portobeloensis =

Species of sea snail

Conus portobeloensis is a species of sea snail, a marine gastropod mollusk in the family Conidae, the cone snails and their allies.

Like all species within the genus Conus, these marine snails are predatory and venomous. They are capable of stinging humans, therefore live ones should be handled carefully or not at all.

== Distribution ==
This species occurs in the Caribbean Sea off Panama.

== Description ==
The maximum recorded shell length is 31 mm.

== Habitat ==
Minimum recorded depth is 30 m. Maximum recorded depth is 30 m.
