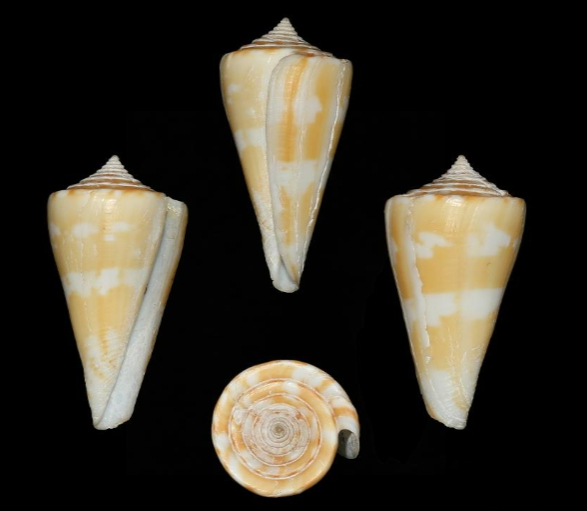
- Shell and protoconch of Conus xanthicus (holotype at the Smithsonian Institution)

Conservation status
- Least Concern (IUCN 3.1)

Scientific classification
- Domain: Eukaryota
- Kingdom: Animalia
- Phylum: Mollusca
- Class: Gastropoda
- Subclass: Caenogastropoda
- Order: Neogastropoda
- Superfamily: Conoidea
- Family: Conidae
- Genus: Conus
- Species: C. xanthicus

Binomial name
- Conus xanthicus Dall, 1910

Synonyms
- Conus (Dauciconus) xanthicus Dall, 1910 · accepted, alternate representation; Conus chrysocestus Berry, 1968; Dauciconus xanthicus (Dall, 1910)

= Conus xanthicus =

Species of sea snail

Conus xanthicus, common name the Guaymas cone, is a species of sea snail, a marine gastropod mollusk in the family Conidae, the cone snails and their allies.

These snails are predatory and venomous. They are capable of stinging humans, therefore live ones should be handled carefully or not at all.

== Description ==
Original description by W.H. Dall: The shell is biconic, solid, with a low, slightly turreted spire, straight sides and about ten whorls. The surface of the whorls on the spire are evenly excavated, smooth, or with two or three faint spiral striae in the channel. The periostracum is dense, brown, and velvety, except where cleaned off, when the substratum, which is very adherent, may appear polished. The suture is simple. The sides of the shell are straight, smooth, with very faint indications of obsolete spiral striation, the striae rather distant. Near the siphonal canal there are, as usual, a few spiral cords. The outer lip is straight, receding to the sinus at each extremity. The ground color of the shell is white with broad brownish yellow irregular areas so disposed as to indicate three irregular white spiral areas, one near the canal, one at about the middle of the side, and the third somewhat in front of the shoulder. In another specimen the yellow color is generally diffused and only the central band is obscurely indicated. There is no pattern on the spire. Height of the shell, 42 mm; of the shoulder, 37 mm; maximum diameter of the shell, 22.5; of the canal, 5 mm.

The size of the shell varies between 22 mm and 50 mm.

== Distribution ==
This marine species occurs in the Gulf of California, Western Mexico down to Honduras; off the Galápagos Islands.
