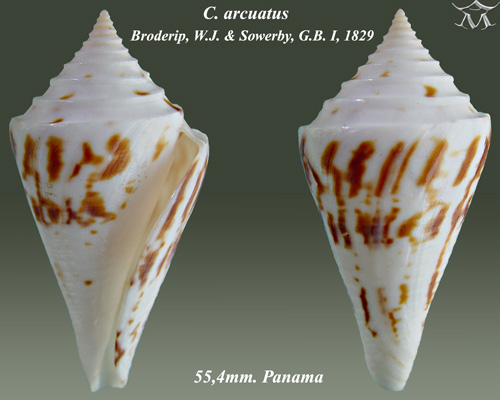
- Apertural and abapertural views of shell of Conasprella arcuata (Broderip, W.J. & Sowerby, G.B. I, 1829)
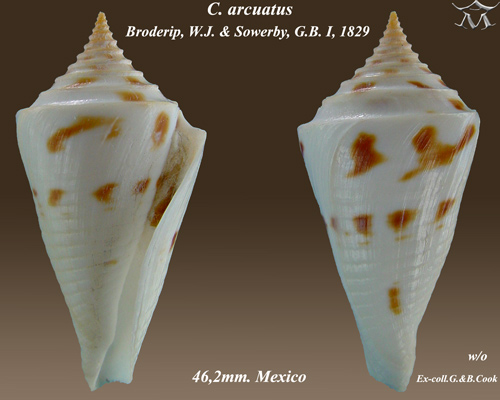

Conservation status
- Least Concern (IUCN 3.1)

Scientific classification
- Kingdom: Animalia
- Phylum: Mollusca
- Class: Gastropoda
- Subclass: Caenogastropoda
- Order: Neogastropoda
- Superfamily: Conoidea
- Family: Conidae
- Genus: Conasprella
- Species: C. arcuata

Binomial name
- Conasprella arcuata (Broderip & G. B. Sowerby I, 1829)

Synonyms
- Conasprella (Kohniconus) arcuata (Broderip & G. B. Sowerby I, 1829) · accepted, alternate representation; Conus arcuatus Broderip & G. B. Sowerby I, 1829 (original combination); Conus borneensis A. Adams & Reeve, 1848; Kohniconus arcuatus (Broderip & G.B. Sowerby I, 1829)

= Conasprella arcuata =

Species of gastropod

Conasprella arcuata, common name the arched cone, is a species of venomous sea snail, a marine gastropod mollusk in the family Conidae, the cone snails and their allies.

Like all species within the genus Conus, these cone snails are predatory and venomous. They are capable of stinging humans, therefore live ones should be handled carefully or not at all.

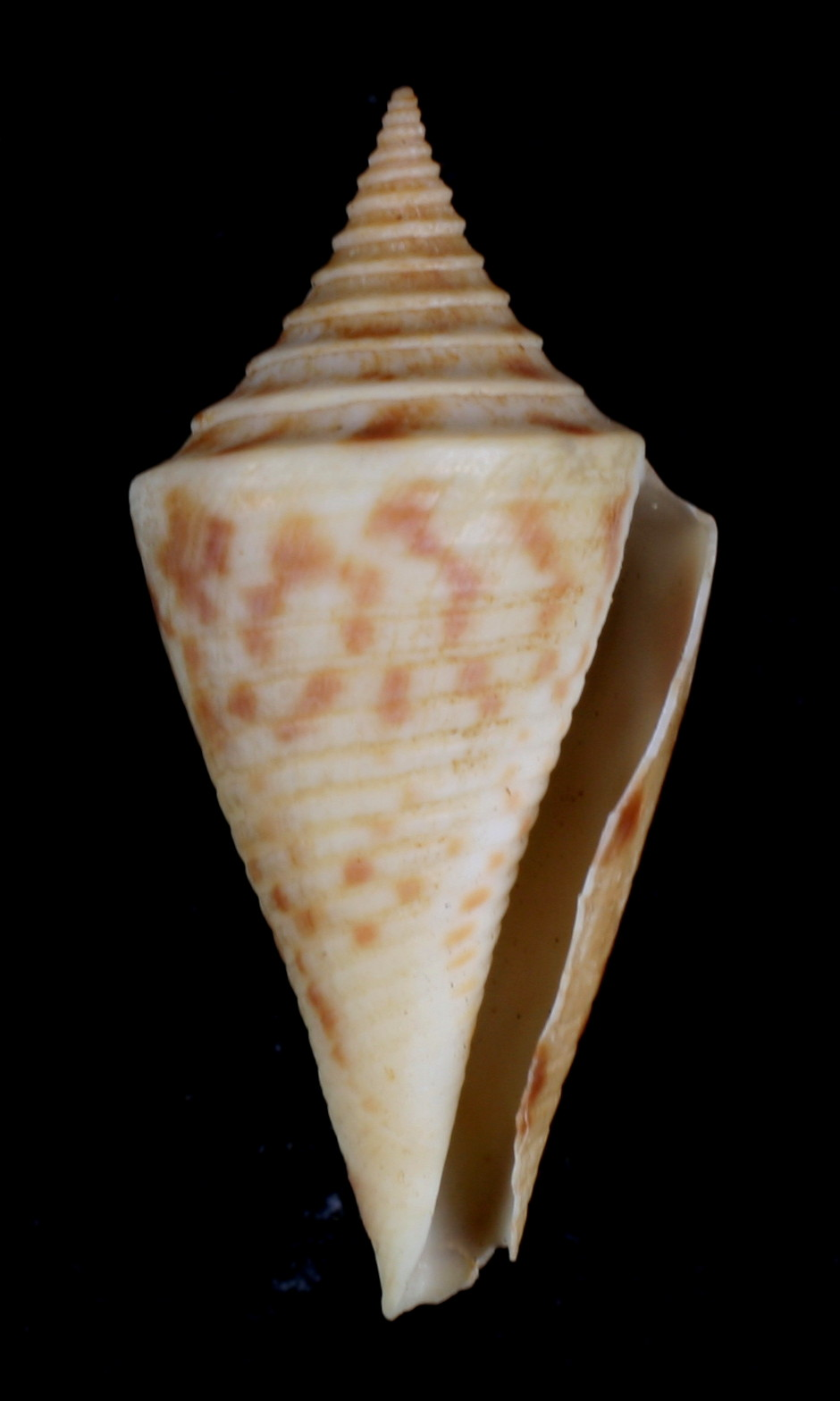
Apertural view of shell of Conasprella arcuata (Broderip & Sowerby I, 1829), measuring 37.9 mm in height, collected in Mexico

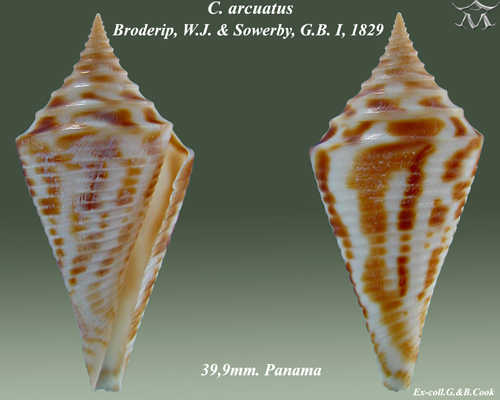
Conasprella arcuata (Broderip, W.J. & Sowerby, G.B. I, 1829)

== Description ==
The size of the shell varies between 35 mm and 60 mm.

== Distribution ==
This marine species occurs in the Gulf of California, and in the Pacific Ocean from Mexico to Peru. Type locality near Mazatlán, Sinaloa, Mexico.

== Sources ==
- Broderip W. J. & Sowerby G. B. (1829). Observations on new or interesting mollusca contained, for the most part, in the Museum of the Zoological Society. Zoological Journal, 4: 359–379, pl. 9
- Puillandre N., Duda T.F., Meyer C., Olivera B.M. & Bouchet P. (2015). One, four or 100 genera? A new classification of the cone snails. Journal of Molluscan Studies. 81: 1–23
