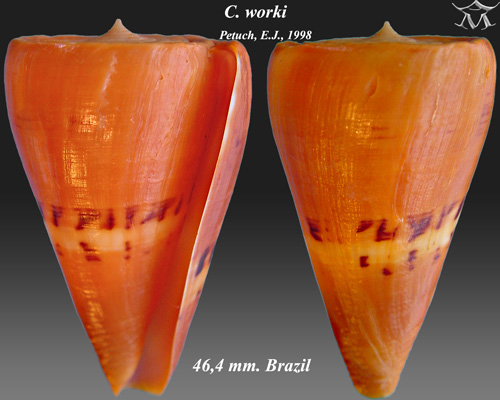
- Apertural and abapertural views of shell of Conus daucus riosi
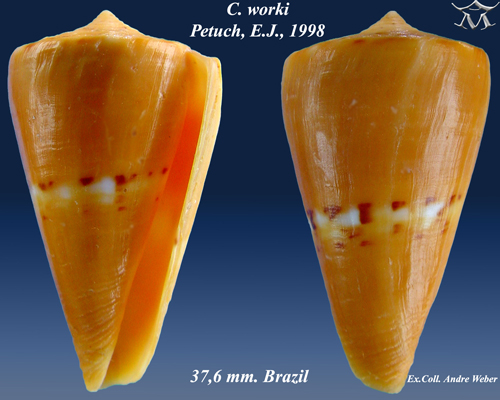

Scientific classification
- Kingdom: Animalia
- Phylum: Mollusca
- Class: Gastropoda
- Subclass: Caenogastropoda
- Order: Neogastropoda
- Family: Conidae
- Genus: Conus
- Species: C. daucus
- Subspecies: C. d. riosi

Trinomial name
- Conus daucus riosi Petuch, 1986

Synonyms
- Conus riosi Petuch, 1986 (original combination); Conus worki Petuch, 1998; Dauciconus daucus riosi (Petuch, 1986) · accepted, alternate representation; Dauciconus worki (Petuch, 1998)

= Conus daucus riosi =

Subspecies of sea snail

Conus daucus riosi is a subspecies of sea snail, a marine gastropod mollusk in the family Conidae, the cone snails and their allies.

Like all species within the genus Conus, these snails are predatory and venomous. They are capable of stinging humans, therefore live ones should be handled carefully or not at all.

== Description ==
The size of the shell varies between 24 mm and 50 mm.

== Distribution ==
This marine species occurs in the Gulf of Mexico; off the Bahamas and off Brazil.
