= Conus boui =

Conservation status
- Least Concern (IUCN 3.1)

Scientific classification
- Kingdom: Animalia
- Phylum: Mollusca
- Class: Gastropoda
- Subclass: Caenogastropoda
- Order: Neogastropoda
- Superfamily: Conoidea
- Family: Conidae
- Genus: Conus
- Species: C. boui

Binomial name
- Conus boui da Motta, 1988

Synonyms
- Conus (Dauciconus) boui da Motta, 1988 · accepted, alternate representation; Dauciconus boui (da Motta, 1988)

Species of sea snail

Conus boui is a species of sea snail, a marine gastropod mollusk in the family Conidae, the cone snails, cone shells or cones.

These snails are predatory and venomous. They are capable of stinging humans.

== Description ==
The size of the shell varies between 30 mm and 50 mm.

== Distribution ==
This marine species occurs in the Mid-Atlantic Ridge and off Martinique.
