= Conasprella kohni =

Conservation status
- Data Deficient (IUCN 3.1)

Scientific classification
- Kingdom: Animalia
- Phylum: Mollusca
- Class: Gastropoda
- Subclass: Caenogastropoda
- Order: Neogastropoda
- Superfamily: Conoidea
- Family: Conidae
- Genus: Conasprella
- Species: C. kohni

Binomial name
- Conasprella kohni (McLean & Nybakken, 1979)

Synonyms
- Conasprella (Kohniconus) kohni (McLean & Nybakken, 1979) · accepted, alternate representation; Conus kohni McLean & Nybakken, 1979 (original combination); Kohniconus kohni (McLean & Nybakken, 1979)

Species of gastropod

Conasprella kohni is a species of sea snail, a marine gastropod mollusk in the family Conidae, known as the cone snails, cone shells or cones.

Like all species within the genus Conasprella, these cone snails are predatory and venomous. They are capable of stinging humans, therefore live ones should be handled carefully or not at all.

== Description ==
The shell grows to a length of 35 mm.

== Distribution ==
This marine species is endemic to the Galapagos Islands, Ecuador.
