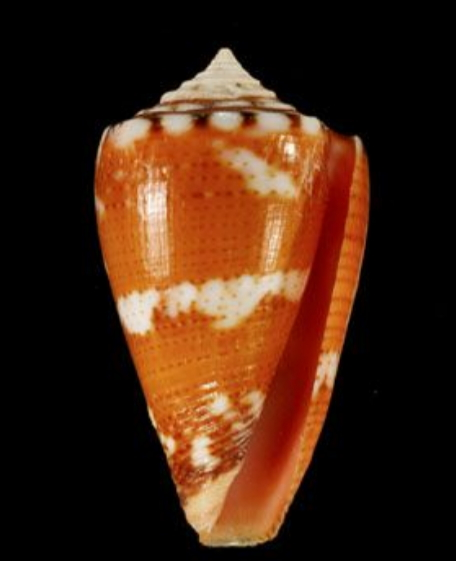
- Shell of Conus abrolhosensis (specimen at the Natural History Museum, Rotterdam)

Scientific classification
- Kingdom: Animalia
- Phylum: Mollusca
- Class: Gastropoda
- Subclass: Caenogastropoda
- Order: Neogastropoda
- Superfamily: Conoidea
- Family: Conidae
- Genus: Conus
- Species: C. abrolhosensis

Binomial name
- Conus abrolhosensis Petuch, 1987

Synonyms
- Conus (Dauciconus) abrolhosensis Petuch, 1987 · accepted, alternate representation; Conus baiano Coltro, 2004; Poremskiconus abrolhosensis (Petuch, 1987)

= Conus abrolhosensis =

Species of sea snail

Conus abrolhosensis is a species of sea snail, a marine gastropod mollusk in the family Conidae, the cone snails, cone shells or cones.

These snails are predatory and venomous. They are capable of stinging humans.

== Description ==
(Original description) The shell is relatively small for its genus. it has a biconic shape and an elevated spire. The body whorl is shiny and polished, featuring numerous raised spiral cords that become more pronounced toward the anterior end. The shoulder is sharply angled and carinated, with a coronated carina on the spire; these coronations are prominent on the early whorls but gradually diminish and become nearly obsolete on the final half of the body whorl.

The aperture is narrow. The shell’s color varies, ranging from orange (as seen in the holotype) to shades of white and blue-purple. The holotype displays scattered white patches around the mid-body and anterior tip. Its spire whorls are dark orange with evenly spaced, oval-shaped white flammules along the periphery. In white and purple specimens, the spire is dark brown but retains the same pattern of evenly spaced white flammules.

The protoconch is large and mamillate. The periostracum is thin, translucent, and smooth, featuring a row of small tufts along the shoulder carina and spire carina, aligned with the shoulder coronations.

The size of the shell varies between 11 mm and 30 mm.

== Distribution ==
Locus typicus: "Off Parcel das Paredes, Abrolhos Archipelago, Bahia State, Brazil."

This marine species of Cone snail occurs in the Caribbean Sea and off the Abrolhos Archipelago, Eastern Brazil.

== Etymology ==
"Named for the Abrolhos Archipelago and reef complex,
Bahia State, Brazil - the type locality."
