= Conus hennequini =

Scientific classification
- Kingdom: Animalia
- Phylum: Mollusca
- Class: Gastropoda
- Subclass: Caenogastropoda
- Order: Neogastropoda
- Superfamily: Conoidea
- Family: Conidae
- Genus: Conus
- Species: C. hennequini

Binomial name
- Conus hennequini Petuch, 1993

Synonyms
- Conus (Dauciconus) hennequini Petuch, 1993 · accepted, alternate representation; Dauciconus hennequini (Petuch, 1993); Poremskiconus hennequini (Petuch, 1993); Purpuriconus hennequini (Petuch, 1993)

Species of sea snail

Conus hennequini is a species of sea snail, a marine gastropod mollusk in the family Conidae, the cone snails and their allies.

Like all species within the genus Conus, these snails are predatory and venomous. They are capable of stinging humans, therefore live ones should be handled carefully or not at all.

== Distribution ==
This marine species occurs in the Caribbean Sea off Honduras and Martinique; in the Mid-Atlantic Ridge.

== Description ==
The maximum recorded shell length is 23 mm.

== Habitat ==
Minimum recorded depth is 2 m. Maximum recorded depth is 2 m.
