= Conus shaskyi =

Scientific classification
- Kingdom: Animalia
- Phylum: Mollusca
- Class: Gastropoda
- Subclass: Caenogastropoda
- Order: Neogastropoda
- Superfamily: Conoidea
- Family: Conidae
- Genus: Conus
- Species: C. shaskyi

Binomial name
- Conus shaskyi (Tenorio, Tucker & Chaney, 2012)

Synonyms
- Conus (Dauciconus) shaskyi (Tenorio, Tucker & Chaney, 2012) accepted, alternate representation; Dauciconus shaskyi Tenorio, Tucker & Chaney, 2012 (original combination)

Species of sea snail

Conus shaskyi is a species of sea snail, a marine gastropod mollusk in the family Conidae, the cone snails, cone shells or cones.

These snails are predatory and venomous. They are capable of stinging humans.

== Description ==
The size of the shell attains 35 mm.

== Distribution ==
This marine species occurs of the Cocos (Keeling) Islands.
