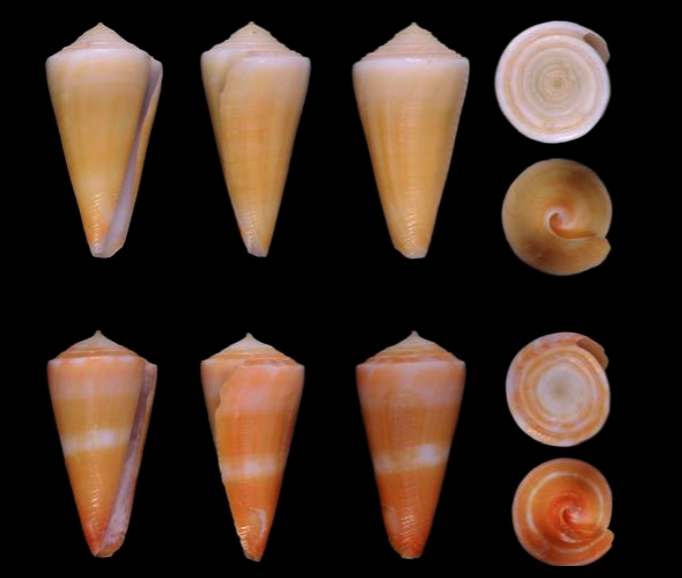
- Apertural and abapertural views of shell of Conus attenuatus Reeve, L.A., 1844
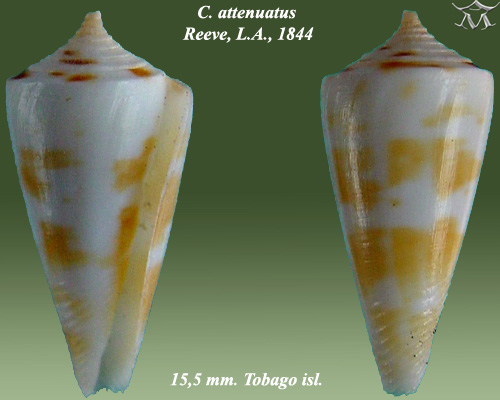

Conservation status
- Least Concern (IUCN 3.1)

Scientific classification
- Kingdom: Animalia
- Phylum: Mollusca
- Class: Gastropoda
- Subclass: Caenogastropoda
- Order: Neogastropoda
- Superfamily: Conoidea
- Family: Conidae
- Genus: Conus
- Species: C. attenuatus

Binomial name
- Conus attenuatus Reeve, 1844

Synonyms
- Attenuiconus attenuatus (Reeve, 1844); Conus (Attenuiconus) attenuatus Reeve, 1844 · accepted, alternate representation; Conus bifasciatus G. B. Sowerby II, 1857 (invalid: junior homonym of Conus bifasciatus Gmelin, 1791); Conus fasciatus A. Adams, 1855 (invalid: junior homonym of Conus fasciatus Schröter, 1803 and several others; C. bifasciatus Sowerby is a replacement name); Conus ustickei Nowell-Usticke, 1959; Dauciconus attenuatus (Reeve, 1844)

= Conus attenuatus =

Species of sea snail

Conus attenuatus, common name the thin cone, is a species of sea snail, a marine gastropod mollusk in the family Conidae, the cone snails and their allies.

Like all species within the genus Conus, these snails are predatory and venomous. They are capable of stinging humans, therefore live ones should be handled carefully or not at all.

== Distribution ==
This species occurs in the Caribbean Sea, the Gulf of Mexico and the Mid-Atlantic Ridge.

== Description ==
The maximum recorded shell length is 28 mm.

== Habitat ==
Minimum recorded depth is 10 m. Maximum recorded depth is 81 m.
