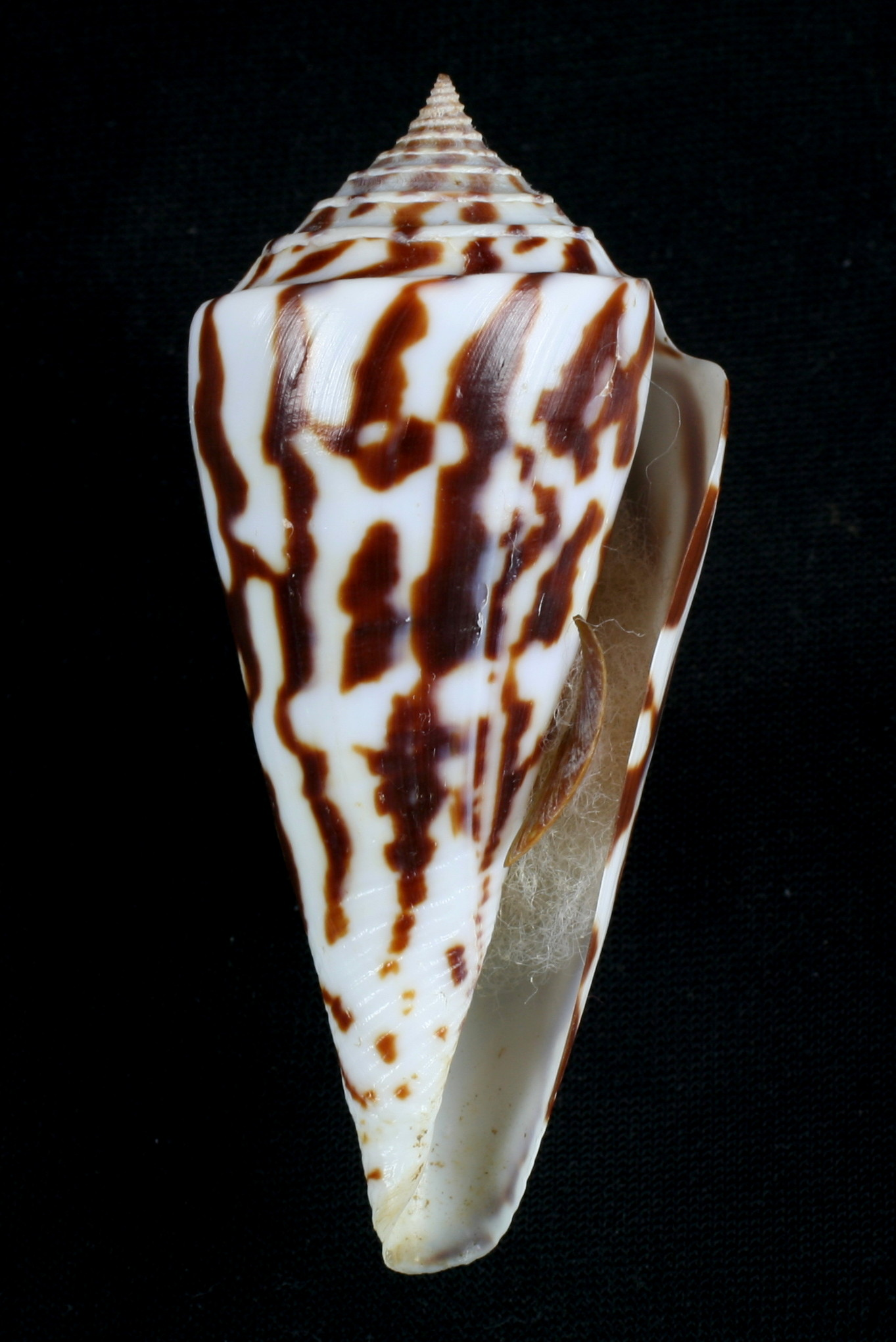
- Apertural view of shell of Conasprella emarginata (Reeve, 1844), with operculum, measuring 80.0 mm in height, collected in the Bay of Chiriqui, Panama.

Scientific classification
- Kingdom: Animalia
- Phylum: Mollusca
- Class: Gastropoda
- Subclass: Caenogastropoda
- Order: Neogastropoda
- Superfamily: Conoidea
- Family: Conidae
- Genus: Conasprella
- Species: C. emerginata

Binomial name
- Conasprella emerginata (Reeve, 1844)

Synonyms
- Conasprella (Kohniconus) emarginata (Reeve, 1844) · accepted, alternate representation; Conus arcuatus Gray, 1839 (invalid: junior homonym of Conus arcuatus Broderip & G.B. Sowerby I, 1829); Conus cinctus Valenciennes, 1832 (invalid: junior homonym of Conus cinctus Bosc, 1801); Conus emarginatus Reeve, 1844 (original combination); Kohniconus emarginatus (Reeve, 1844)

= Conasprella emarginata =

Species of gastropod

Conasprella emarginata is a species of sea snail, a marine gastropod mollusk in the family Conidae, the cone snails and their allies.

Like all other species within the genus Conasprella, these cone snails are predatory and venomous. They are capable of stinging humans, therefore live ones should be handled carefully or not at all.

== Description ==
The size of the shell varies between 34 mm and 70 mm.

== Distribution ==
Bahía Magdalena, Baja California Sur, through most of Golfo de California, Mexico. South to Peru. It has also been reported from Islas Galapagos.

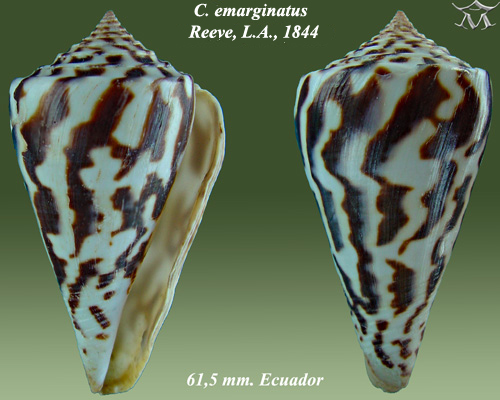
Conasprella emarginata (Reeve, L.A., 1844)

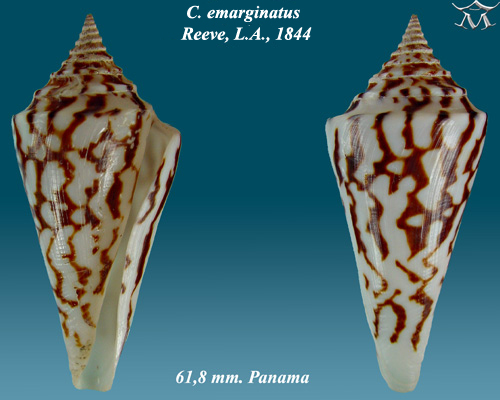
Conasprella emarginata (Reeve, L.A., 1844)
