= Conus lightbourni =

Scientific classification
- Kingdom: Animalia
- Phylum: Mollusca
- Class: Gastropoda
- Subclass: Caenogastropoda
- Order: Neogastropoda
- Superfamily: Conoidea
- Family: Conidae
- Genus: Conus
- Species: C. lightbourni

Binomial name
- Conus lightbourni Petuch, 1986

Synonyms
- Bermudaconus lightbourni (Petuch, 1986); Conus (Bermudaconus) lightbourni Petuch, 1986 · accepted, alternate representation; Dauciconus lightbourni (Petuch, 1986)

Species of sea snail

Conus lightbourni is a species of sea snail, a marine gastropod mollusk in the family Conidae, the cone snails and their allies.

Like all species within the genus Conus, these snails are predatory and venomous. They are capable of stinging humans, therefore live ones should be handled carefully or not at all.

== Distribution ==
This marine species occurs off Bermuda.

== Description ==
The maximum recorded shell length is 47.7 mm.

== Habitat ==
Minimum recorded depth is 497 m. Maximum recorded depth is 497 m.
