= Conus bessei =

Conservation status
- Least Concern (IUCN 3.1)

Scientific classification
- Kingdom: Animalia
- Phylum: Mollusca
- Class: Gastropoda
- Subclass: Caenogastropoda
- Order: Neogastropoda
- Superfamily: Conoidea
- Family: Conidae
- Genus: Conus
- Species: C. bessei

Binomial name
- Conus bessei Petuch, 1992

Synonyms
- Conus (Dauciconus) bessei Petuch, 1992 · accepted, alternate representation; Cariboconus bessei (Petuch, 1992); Purpuriconus bessei (Petuch, 1992)

Species of sea snail

Conus bessei is a species of sea snail, a marine gastropod mollusk in the family Conidae, the cone snails and their allies.

Like all species within the genus Conus, these snails are predatory and venomous. They are capable of stinging humans, therefore live ones should be handled carefully or not at all.

== Distribution ==
This species occurs in the Caribbean Sea off Honduras and Belize

== Description ==
The maximum recorded shell length is 15 mm.

== Habitat ==
Minimum recorded depth is 20 m. Maximum recorded depth is 20 m.
