= Conus marileeae =

Scientific classification
- Kingdom: Animalia
- Phylum: Mollusca
- Class: Gastropoda
- Subclass: Caenogastropoda
- Order: Neogastropoda
- Superfamily: Conoidea
- Family: Conidae
- Genus: Conus
- Species: C. marileeae

Binomial name
- Conus marileeae (Harasewych, 2014)

Synonyms
- Attenuiconus marileeae Harasewych, 2014 (original description); Conus (Attenuiconus) marileeae (Harasewych, 2014) · accepted, alternate representation

Species of sea snail

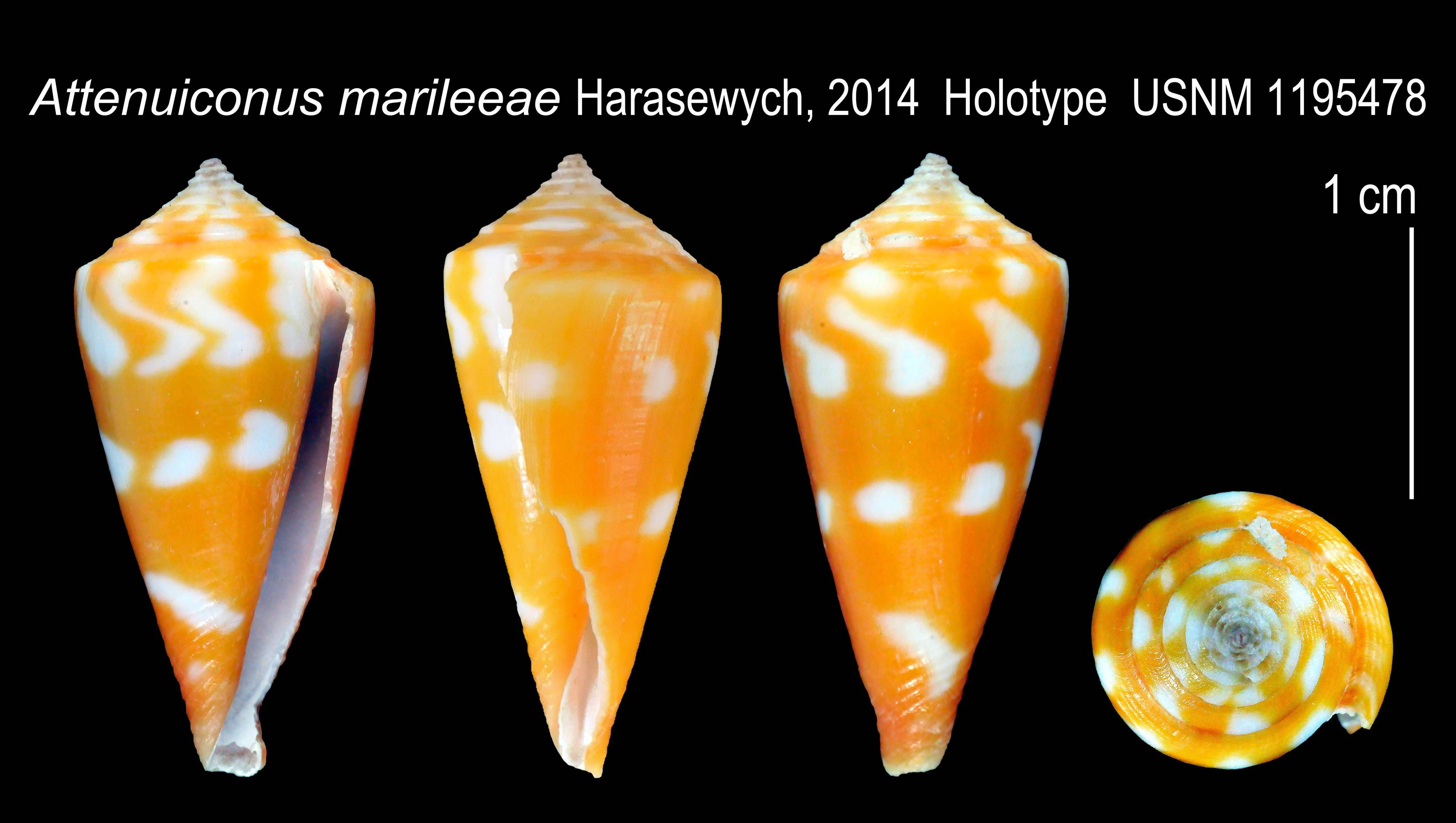
Conus marileeae

Conus marileeae is a species of sea snails, a marine gastropod mollusc in the family Conidae, the cone snails and their allies.

Like all species within the genus Conus, these snails are predatory and venomous. They are capable of stinging humans, therefore live ones should be handled carefully or not at all.

== Distribution ==
This species occurs in the Caribbean Sea off Curaçao.

== Description ==
The size of the shell attains 20 mm.
