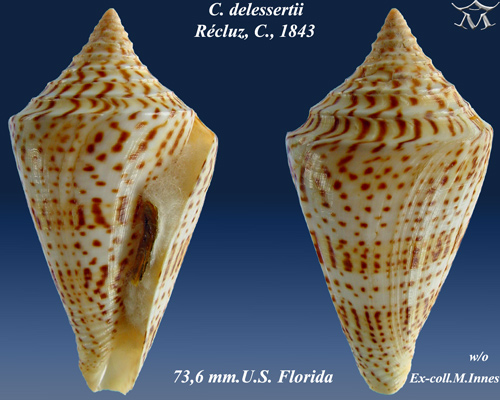
- Apertural and abapertural views of shell of Conasprella delessertii Récluz, C., 1843
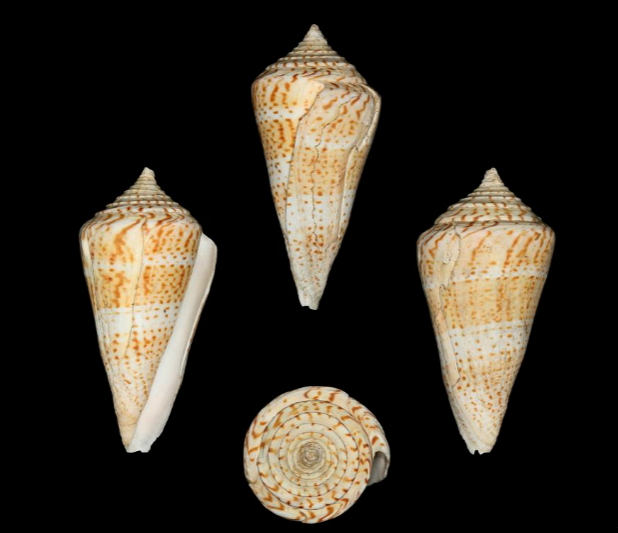

Conservation status
- Least Concern (IUCN 3.1)

Scientific classification
- Kingdom: Animalia
- Phylum: Mollusca
- Class: Gastropoda
- Subclass: Caenogastropoda
- Order: Neogastropoda
- Superfamily: Conoidea
- Family: Conidae
- Genus: Conasprella
- Species: C. delessertii

Binomial name
- Conasprella delessertii (Récluz, 1843)

Synonyms
- Conasprella (incertae sedis) delessertii (Récluz, 1843); Conus delessertii Récluz, 1843 (original combination); Conus sozoni Bartsch, 1939; Kohniconus delessertii (Récluz, 1843) · accepted, alternate representation

= Conasprella delessertii =

Species of gastropod

Conasprella delessertii, common name Sozon's cone, is a species of sea snail, a marine gastropod mollusk in the family Conidae, the cone snails and their allies.

This species couldn't be placed in any subgenus of Conasprella and is therefore designated as incertae sedis.

Like all species within the genus Conasprella, these snails are predatory and venomous. They are capable of stinging humans. Therefore, live ones should be handled carefully or not at all. It was named after Benjamin Delessert (1773–1847), a French banker and naturalist.

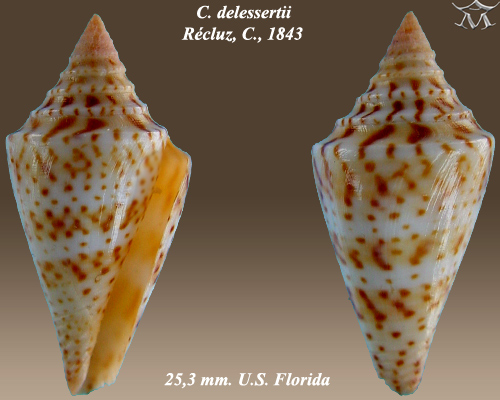
Conasprella delessertii (Récluz, C., 1843)

== Description ==
The maximum recorded shell length is 100 mm.

== Habitat ==
Minimum recorded depth is 15 m. Maximum recorded depth is 198 m.

== Distribution ==
This marine species occurs in the Gulf of Mexico.

This species is also found in the North Atlantic Ocean, off the East coast of Florida and on shipwrecks in North Carolina.
