= Conus belizeanus =

Scientific classification
- Kingdom: Animalia
- Phylum: Mollusca
- Class: Gastropoda
- Subclass: Caenogastropoda
- Order: Neogastropoda
- Superfamily: Conoidea
- Family: Conidae
- Genus: Conus
- Species: C. belizeanus

Binomial name
- Conus belizeanus (Petuch & Sargent, 2011)

Synonyms
- Conus (Dauciconus) belizeanus (Petuch & Sargent, 2011) · accepted, alternate representation; Purpuriconus belizeanus Petuch & Sargent, 2011 (original combination)

Species of sea snail

Conus belizeanus is a species of sea snail, a marine gastropod mollusk in the family Conidae, the cone snails and their allies.

Like all species within the genus Conus, these snails are predatory and venomous. They are capable of stinging humans, therefore live ones should be handled carefully.

== Description ==
The size of the shell varies between 15 mm and 17 mm.

== Distribution ==
This species occurs in the Caribbean Sea off Belize.
