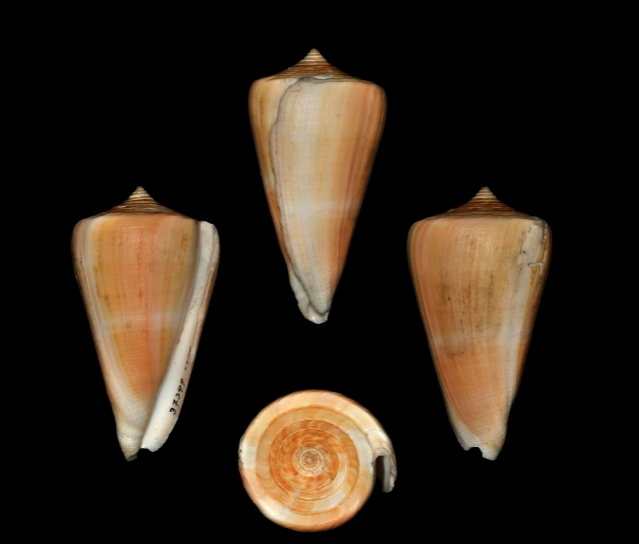
- shell of Conus virgatus, specimen at the Smithsonian Institution

Conservation status
- Least Concern (IUCN 3.1)

Scientific classification
- Kingdom: Animalia
- Phylum: Mollusca
- Class: Gastropoda
- Subclass: Caenogastropoda
- Order: Neogastropoda
- Superfamily: Conoidea
- Family: Conidae
- Genus: Conus
- Species: C. virgatus

Binomial name
- Conus virgatus Reeve, 1849

Synonyms
- Conus (Dauciconus) virgatus Reeve, 1849 · accepted, alternate representation; Conus cumingii Reeve, 1849 (invalid: junior homonym of Conus cumingii Reeve, 1848); Conus signae Bartsch, 1937; Dauciconus virgatus (Reeve, 1849)

= Conus virgatus =

Species of sea snail

Conus virgatus, common name the virgate Panama cone, is a species of sea snail, a marine gastropod mollusk in the family Conidae, the cone snails and their allies.

Like all species within the genus Conus, these snails are predatory and venomous. They are capable of stinging humans, therefore live ones should be handled carefully or not at all.

== Description ==
The size of the shell varies between 35 mm and 70 mm. The rather narrow shell is pinkish white, continuously but irregularly longitudinally strigate with chestnut.

== Distribution ==
This marine species occurs in the Pacific Ocean from Baja California, Mexico to North Peru.

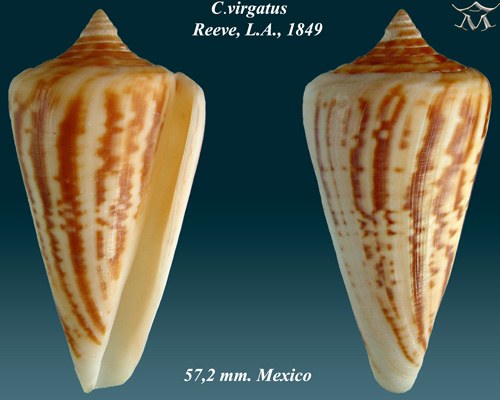
Conus virgatus Reeve, L.A., 1849

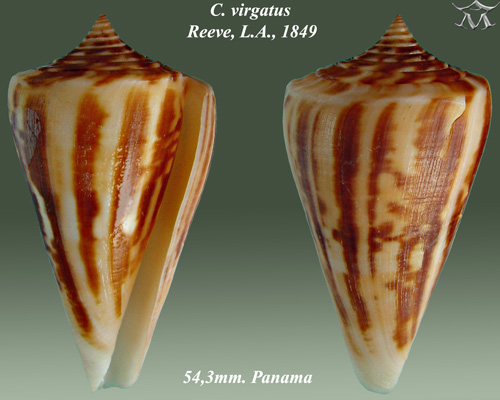
Conus virgatus Reeve, L.A., 1849

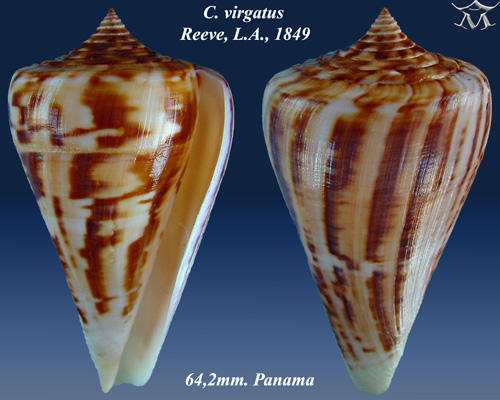
Conus virgatus Reeve, L.A., 1849
