= Conus ignotus =

Conservation status
- Data Deficient (IUCN 3.1)

Scientific classification
- Kingdom: Animalia
- Phylum: Mollusca
- Class: Gastropoda
- Subclass: Caenogastropoda
- Order: Neogastropoda
- Superfamily: Conoidea
- Family: Conidae
- Genus: Conus
- Species: C. ignotus

Binomial name
- Conus ignotus Cargile, 1998

Synonyms
- Attenuiconus ignotus (Cargile, 1998); Conus (Kellyconus) ignotus Cargile, 1998 · accepted, alternate representation; Kellyconus ignotus (Cargile, 1998)

Species of sea snail

Conus ignotus is a species of sea snail, a marine gastropod mollusk in the family Conidae, the cone snails and their allies.

Like all species within the genus Conus, these snails are predatory and venomous. They are capable of stinging humans, therefore live ones should be handled carefully or not at all.

== Distribution ==
This species occurs in the Caribbean Sea off Nicaragua to Colombia.

== Description ==
The size of the shell varies between 15 mm and 25 mm.
