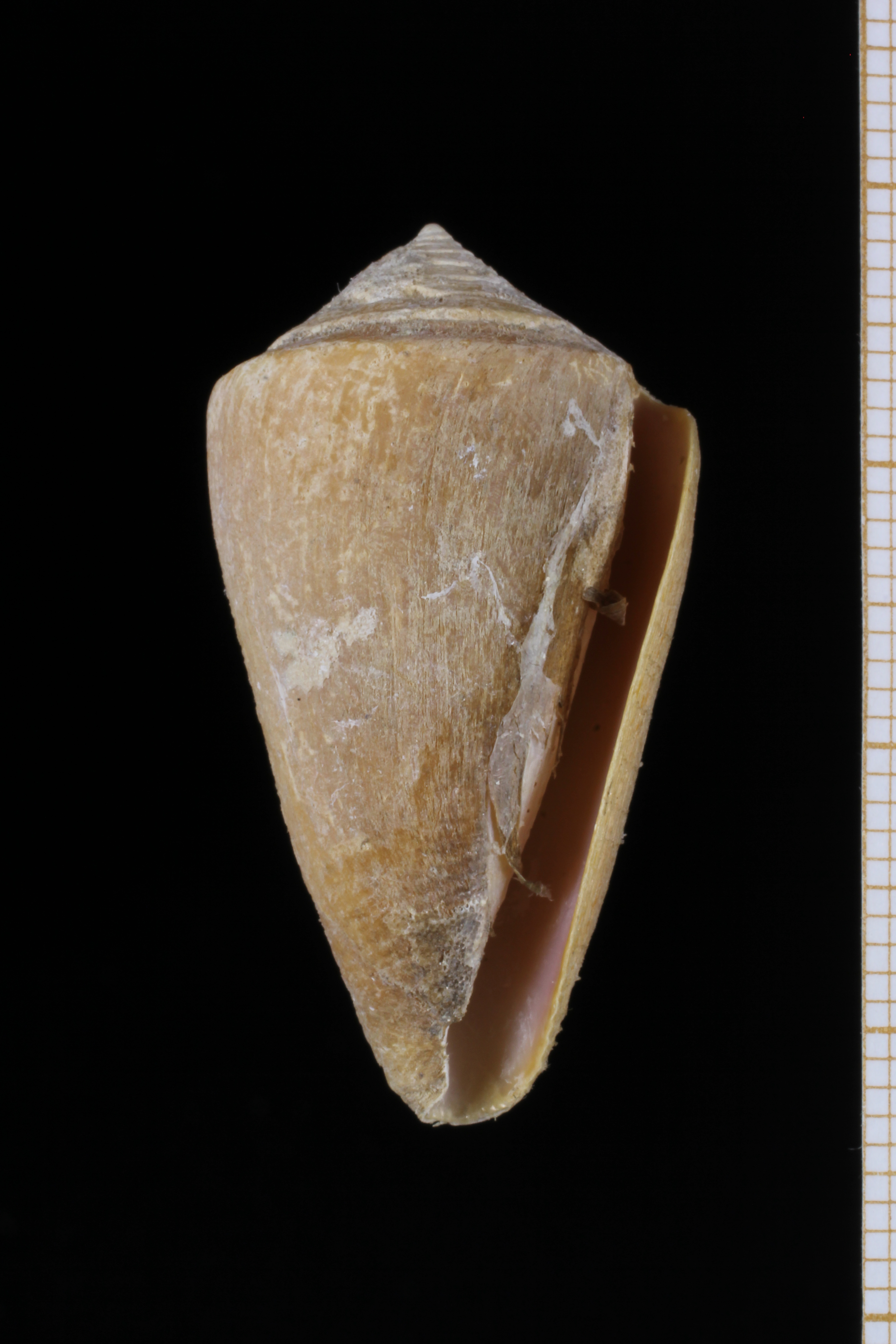
- Shell of Conus colombi (specimen at MNHN, Paris)

Scientific classification
- Kingdom: Animalia
- Phylum: Mollusca
- Class: Gastropoda
- Subclass: Caenogastropoda
- Order: Neogastropoda
- Superfamily: Conoidea
- Family: Conidae
- Genus: Conus
- Species: C. colombi

Binomial name
- Conus colombi (Monnier & Limpalaër, 2012)

Synonyms
- Conus (Dauciconus) colombi (Monnier & Limpalaër, 2012) · accepted, alternate representation; Dauciconus colombi Monnier & Limpalaër, 2012; Poremskiconus colombi (Monnier & Limpalaër, 2012)

= Conus colombi =

Species of sea snail

Conus colombi is a species of sea snail, a marine gastropod mollusc in the family Conidae, the cone snails, cone shells or cones. These snails are predatory and venomous, and they are capable of harming humans.

== Description ==
The size of the shell varies between 18 and 33 mm (0.71 and 1.30 in).

== Distribution ==
This species can be found in the Caribbean Sea off Martinique.
