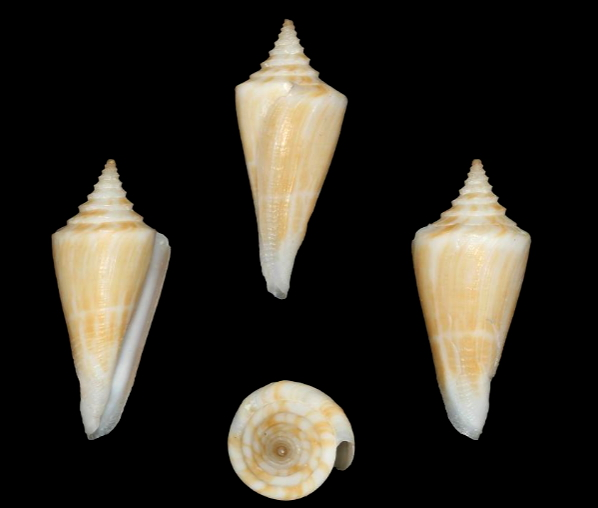
- Shell and protoconch of Conus parascalaris (holotype at the Smithsonian Institution)

Scientific classification
- Kingdom: Animalia
- Phylum: Mollusca
- Class: Gastropoda
- Subclass: Caenogastropoda
- Order: Neogastropoda
- Superfamily: Conoidea
- Family: Conidae
- Genus: Conus
- Species: C. parascalaris

Binomial name
- Conus parascalaris Petuch, 1987

Synonyms
- Conus (Dauciconus) parascalaris Petuch, 1987 · accepted, alternative representation; Dauciconus parascalaris (Petuch, 1987); Gradiconus parascalaris (Petuch, 1987)

= Conus parascalaris =

Species of sea snail

Conus parascalaris is a species of sea snail, a marine gastropod mollusk in the family Conidae, the cone snails and their allies.

Like all species within the genus Conus, these snails are predatory and venomous. They are capable of stinging humans, therefore live ones should be handled carefully or not at all.

== Description ==
Original description: "Shell thin, fragile, elongated; spire elevated, protracted, scalariform; shoulder sharply angled; body whorl smooth, polished; anterior end with numerous fine, incised sulci; color white, overlaid with closely-packed, thin, vertical, pale tan flammules; spire with scattered tan, crescent-shaped flammules; interior of aperture white; periostracum thin, pale tan, with tufts along shoulder."

The maximum recorded shell length is 23 mm.

== Distribution ==
Locus typicus: "Gulf of Venezuela, off Punto Fijo, Falcon, Venezuela."

This species occurs in the Caribbean Sea off Venezuela at a depth of 35 m.

== Habitat ==
Minimum recorded depth is 35 m. Maximum recorded depth is 35 m.
