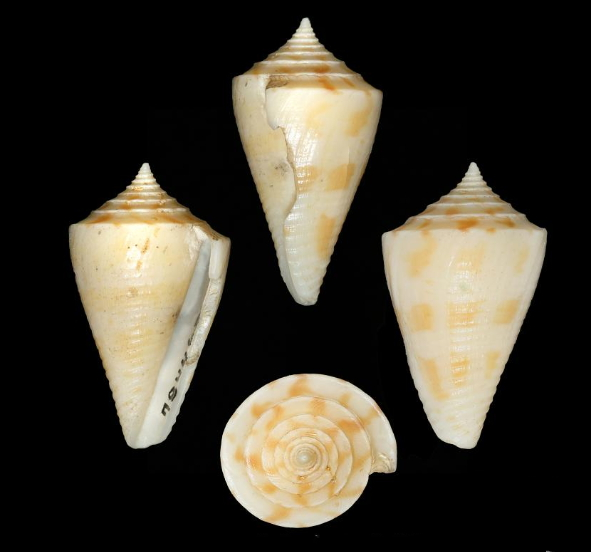
- Shell and protoconch of Conasprella rachelae (specimen at the Smithsonian Institution)

Conservation status
- Least Concern (IUCN 3.1)

Scientific classification
- Kingdom: Animalia
- Phylum: Mollusca
- Class: Gastropoda
- Subclass: Caenogastropoda
- Order: Neogastropoda
- Superfamily: Conoidea
- Family: Conidae
- Genus: Conasprella
- Species: C. rachelae

Binomial name
- Conasprella rachelae (Petuch, 1988)

Synonyms
- Conasprella (Kohniconus) rachelae (Petuch, 1988) · accepted, alternate representation; Conus rachelae Petuch, 1988 (original combination); Jaspidiconus rachelae (Petuch, 1988); Kellyconus rachelae (Petuch, 1988); Kohniconus rachelae (Petuch, 1988)

= Conasprella rachelae =

Species of gastropod

Conasprella rachelae is a species of sea snail, a marine gastropod mollusk in the family Conidae, the cone snails and their allies.

Like all species within the genus Conasprella, these cone snails are predatory and venomous. They are capable of stinging humans, therefore live ones should be handled carefully or not at all.

== Description ==
The maximum recorded shell length is 24 mm.

== Habitat ==
Minimum recorded depth is 35 m. Maximum recorded depth is 35 m.

== Distribution ==
This species occurs in the Caribbean Sea off Venezuela.
