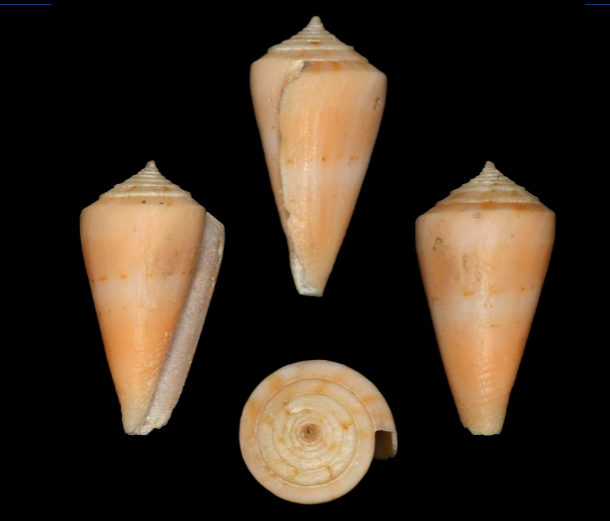
- Shell and protoconch of Conus glicksteini (holotype at the Smithsonian Institution)

Scientific classification
- Kingdom: Animalia
- Phylum: Mollusca
- Class: Gastropoda
- Subclass: Caenogastropoda
- Order: Neogastropoda
- Superfamily: Conoidea
- Family: Conidae
- Genus: Conus
- Species: C. glicksteini

Binomial name
- Conus glicksteini Petuch, 1987

Synonyms
- Conus (Dauciconus) glicksteini Petuch, 1987 · accepted, alternate representation; Dauciconus glicksteini (Petuch, 1987)

= Conus glicksteini =

Species of sea snail

Conus glicksteini is a species of sea snail, a marine gastropod mollusk in the family Conidae, the cone snails and their allies.

Like all species within the genus Conus, these snails are predatory and venomous. They are capable of stinging humans, therefore live ones should be handled carefully or not at all.

== Description ==
Original description: "Shell small for genus, thin, delicate, with low spire; body whorl smooth and shiny, with only few weak spiral threads around anterior tip; color varying from salmon-pink to pinkish-lavender, with evenly spaced pale tan lines or rows of dots around body whorl (holotype salmon-pink with only few rows of pale tan dots around mid-body); all specimens with paler band around mid-body and around shoulder; spire whorls with numerous pale orange, thin, crescent-shaped flammules; interior of aperture pink; protoconch and early whorls bright pink in all specimens, regardless of body whorl color: aperture narrow, shoulder slightly rounded."

The maximum recorded shell length is 22 mm.

== Distribution ==
Locus typicus: "(Dredged from) 400 feet depth off Palm Beach Island, Palm Beach County, Florida, USA."

This marine species occurs off Eastern Florida.

== Habitat ==
Minimum recorded depth is 122 m. Maximum recorded depth is 122 m.
