= Conus flammeacolor =

Conservation status
- Least Concern (IUCN 3.1)

Scientific classification
- Kingdom: Animalia
- Phylum: Mollusca
- Class: Gastropoda
- Subclass: Caenogastropoda
- Order: Neogastropoda
- Superfamily: Conoidea
- Family: Conidae
- Genus: Conus
- Species: C. flammeacolor

Binomial name
- Conus flammeacolor Petuch, 1992

Synonyms
- Conus (Dauciconus) flammeacolor Petuch, 1992 · accepted, alternate representation; Dauciconus flammeacolor (Petuch, 1992); Poremskiconus flammeacolor (Petuch, 1992)

Species of sea snail

Conus flammeacolor is a species of sea snail, a marine gastropod mollusk in the family Conidae, the cone snails and their allies.

Like all species within the genus Conus, these snails are predatory and venomous. They are capable of stinging humans, therefore live ones should be handled carefully or not at all.

== Distribution ==
This species occurs in the Caribbean Sea off Honduras and Panama.

== Description ==
The maximum recorded shell length is 26 mm.

== Habitat ==
Minimum recorded depth is 20 m. Maximum recorded depth is 55 m.
