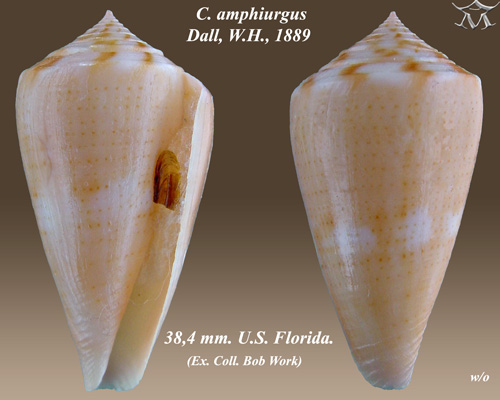
- Apertural and abapertural views of shell of Conus amphiurgus Dall, W.H., 1889
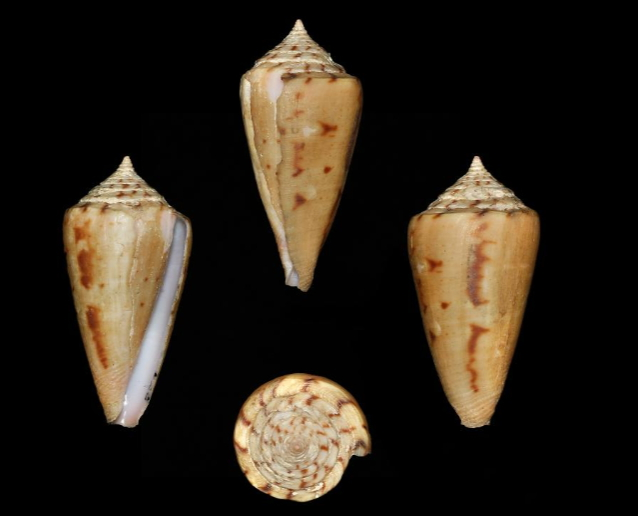

Conservation status
- Least Concern (IUCN 3.1)

Scientific classification
- Kingdom: Animalia
- Phylum: Mollusca
- Class: Gastropoda
- Subclass: Caenogastropoda
- Order: Neogastropoda
- Superfamily: Conoidea
- Family: Conidae
- Genus: Conus
- Species: C. amphiurgus

Binomial name
- Conus amphiurgus Dall, 1889

Synonyms
- Conus (Dauciconus) amphiurgus Dall, 1889 · accepted, alternate representation; Conus centurio auct. non Born, 1778; Conus flamingo Petuch, 1980; Conus juliae Clench, 1942; Conus villepinii auct. non Fischer & Bernardi, 1857; Dauciconus amphiurgus (Dall, 1889); Leptoconus amphiurgus (Dall, 1889); Leptoconus juliae (Clench, 1942)

= Conus amphiurgus =

Species of sea snail

Conus amphiurgus, common name the amphiurgus cone, is a species of sea snail, a marine gastropod mollusc in the family Conidae, the cone snails and their allies.

These snails are predatory and venomous. They are capable of stinging humans, therefore live ones should be handled carefully or not at all.

== Distribution ==
Locus typicus: "Pta. Guanajibo and Pta. Arenas,
encompassing the Bahia Bramadero on the West coast of Puerto Rico."

This species occurs in the tropical Western Atlantic, the Caribbean Sea and the Gulf of Mexico.

== Description ==
The maximum recorded shell length is 54 mm.

== Habitat ==
Minimum recorded depth is 9 m. Maximum recorded depth is 61 m.
