= Conus maya =

Scientific classification
- Kingdom: Animalia
- Phylum: Mollusca
- Class: Gastropoda
- Subclass: Caenogastropoda
- Order: Neogastropoda
- Superfamily: Conoidea
- Family: Conidae
- Genus: Conus
- Species: C. maya

Binomial name
- Conus maya (Petuch & Sargent, 2011)

Synonyms
- Conus (Dauciconus) maya (Petuch & Sargent, 2011) · accepted, alternate representation; Dauciconus maya (Petuch & Sargent, 2011); Gradiconus maya Petuch & Sargent, 2011 (original combination)

Species of sea snail

Conus maya is a species of sea snail, a marine gastropod mollusk in the family Conidae, the cone snails and their allies.

Like all species within the genus Conus, these marine snails are predatory and venomous. They are capable of stinging humans, therefore live ones should be handled carefully or not at all.

== Description ==
The size of the shell varies between 28 mm and 46 mm.

== Distribution ==
This species occurs in the Caribbean Sea off Yucatan, Mexico.
