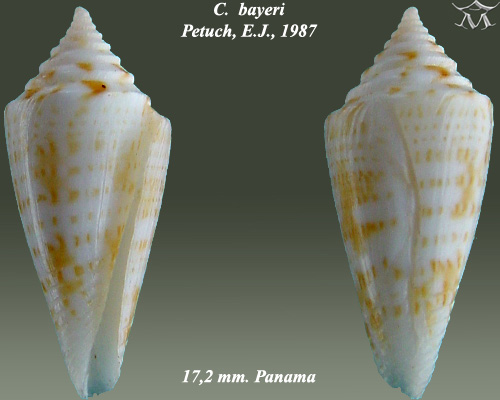
- Apertural and abapertural views of shell of Conus bayeri (Petuch, E.J., 1987)
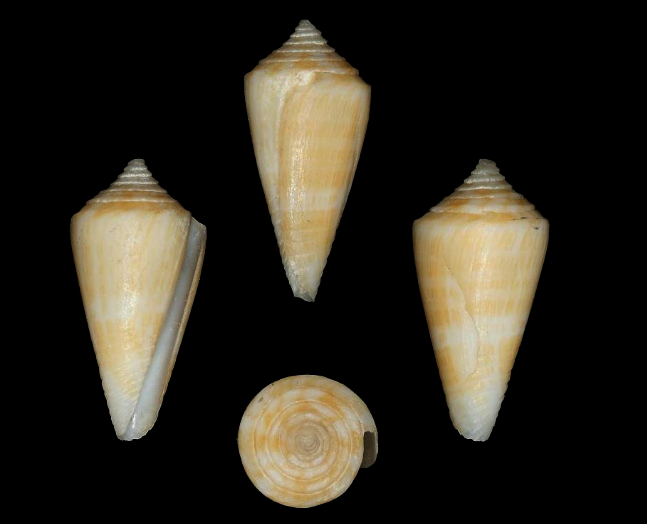

Conservation status
- Least Concern (IUCN 3.1)

Scientific classification
- Kingdom: Animalia
- Phylum: Mollusca
- Class: Gastropoda
- Subclass: Caenogastropoda
- Order: Neogastropoda
- Superfamily: Conoidea
- Family: Conidae
- Genus: Conus
- Species: C. bayeri

Binomial name
- Conus bayeri Petuch, 1987

Synonyms
- Conus (Dauciconus) bayeri Petuch, 1987 · accepted, alternative representation; Gradiconus bayeri (Petuch, 1987); Profundiconus bayeri (Petuch, 1987)

= Conus bayeri =

Species of sea snail

Conus bayeri is a species of sea snail, a marine gastropod mollusk in the family Conidae, the cone snails and their allies.

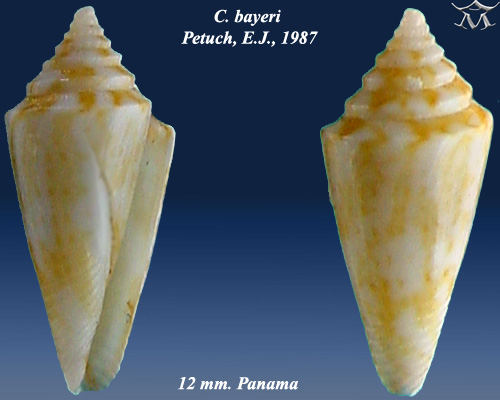
Conus bayeri Petuch, E.J., 1987

Like all species within the genus Conus, these marine snails are predatory and venomous. They are capable of stinging humans, therefore live ones should be handled carefully or not at all.

== Description ==
Original description: "Shell small for genus, slender with low spire; body whorl smooth, with 10 incised sulci around anterior tip; shoulder sharp-angled, carinated; spire whorls slightly canaliculate; 2 small spiral sulci on body whorl just below shoulder carina; shell color white with 6 wide spiral bands made up of small, pale yellow-tan vertical lines; clear band around mid-body; anterior tip white; spiral whorls with scattered pale yellow-tan flammules; interior of aperture white; early whorls with beaded carina."

The maximum recorded shell length is 16 mm.

== Distribution ==
Locus typicus: "Golfo de Morrosquillo, Colombia."

This species occurs in the Caribbean Sea off Panama and Colombia.

== Habitat ==
Minimum recorded depth is 35 m. Maximum recorded depth is 35 m.
