= Conus goajira =

Scientific classification
- Kingdom: Animalia
- Phylum: Mollusca
- Class: Gastropoda
- Subclass: Caenogastropoda
- Order: Neogastropoda
- Superfamily: Conoidea
- Family: Conidae
- Genus: Conus
- Species: C. goajira

Binomial name
- Conus goajira Petuch, 1992

Synonyms
- Conus (Dauciconus) goajira Petuch, 1992 · accepted, alternate representation; Dauciconus goajira (Petuch, 1992)

Species of sea snail

Conus goajira is a species of sea snail, a marine gastropod mollusk in the family Conidae, the cone snails, cone shells or cones.

These snails are predatory and venomous. They are capable of stinging humans.

== Description ==
The size of the shell is 35 mm long. The shell is generally orange and sometimes bears a white stripe pattern (can be vertical or horizontal).

== Distribution ==
This marine species can be found around Cabo la Vela, Goajira Peninsula, and Colombia.
