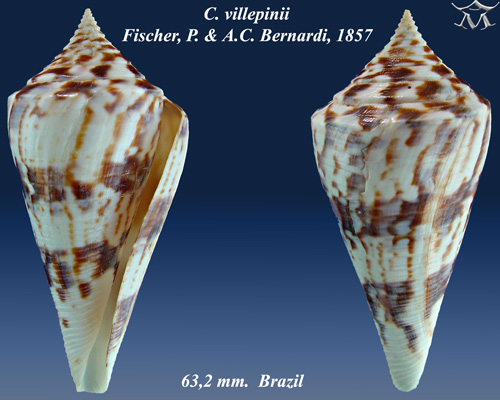
- Apertural and abapertural views of shell of Conus villepinii Fischer, P. & A.C. Bernardi, 1857
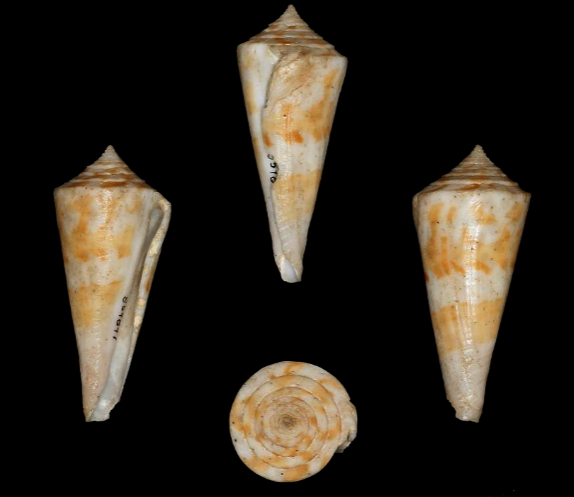

Scientific classification
- Kingdom: Animalia
- Phylum: Mollusca
- Class: Gastropoda
- Subclass: Caenogastropoda
- Order: Neogastropoda
- Superfamily: Conoidea
- Family: Conidae
- Genus: Conus
- Species: C. villepinii

Binomial name
- Conus villepinii Fischer & Bernardi, 1857

Synonyms
- Conasprelloides villepinii (P. Fischer & Bernardi, 1857); Conasprelloides villepinii fosteri (Clench, 1942); Conasprelloides villepinii villepinii (P. Fischer & Bernardi, 1857); Conus (Dauciconus) villepinii P. Fischer & Bernardi, 1857 · accepted, alternate representation; Conus (Sandericonus) sanderi Wils & Moolenbeek, 1979· accepted, alternate representation; Conus fosteri Clench, 1942; Conus perprotractus Petuch, 1987; Conus sanderi Wils & Moolenbeek, 1979; Conus sorenseni Sander, 1982; Conus villepinii fosteri Clench, 1942; Conus villepinii f. sanderi Wils & Moolenbeek, 1979; Conus villepinii guadalupensis Bozzetti, 2017; Conus villepinii villepinii P. Fischer & Bernardi, 1857; Dauciconus sanderi (Wils & Moolenbeek, 1979); Sandericonus hunti (Wils & Moolenbeek, 1979); Sandericonus perprotractus (Petuch, 1987); Sandericonus sanderi (Wils & Moolenbeek, 1979); Sandericonus sorenseni (Sander, 1982)

= Conus villepinii =

Species of sea snail

Conus villepinii, common name Villepin's cone is a species of sea snail, a marine gastropod mollusk in the family Conidae, the cone snails and their allies.

Like all species within the genus Conus, these snails are predatory and venomous. They are capable of stinging humans, therefore live ones should be handled carefully or not at all.

== Distribution ==
Locus typicus: Marie Galante de Guadeloupe, Lesser Antilles. The whereabouts of the original type specimen is unknown.

This variable marine species occurs from Florida to Southern Brazil and off Bermuda.

The species is better known from the Gulf of Mexico (trawler) sources. Immature specimens with purplish background colour, dredged off Barbados, may have been described as Conus hunti, Wils & Moolenbeek, 1979. The coloration of the living animal of these immature Barbados specimens of around 20 mm. in overall length is a dirty-white with flecks of black, and black fringing at the edge of the mantle and siphonal canal.

The type locality of Conus sanderi, Wils & Moolenbeek, 1979 is off St. James, west coast of Barbados West Indies, where type material was dredged at 155–180 metres depth by R.V. Martlet, operating from Bellairs Research Institute of McGill University at Holetown, Barbados. This species also known from as far south as Eastern Brazil.

== Description ==
The maximum recorded shell length is 93 mm.

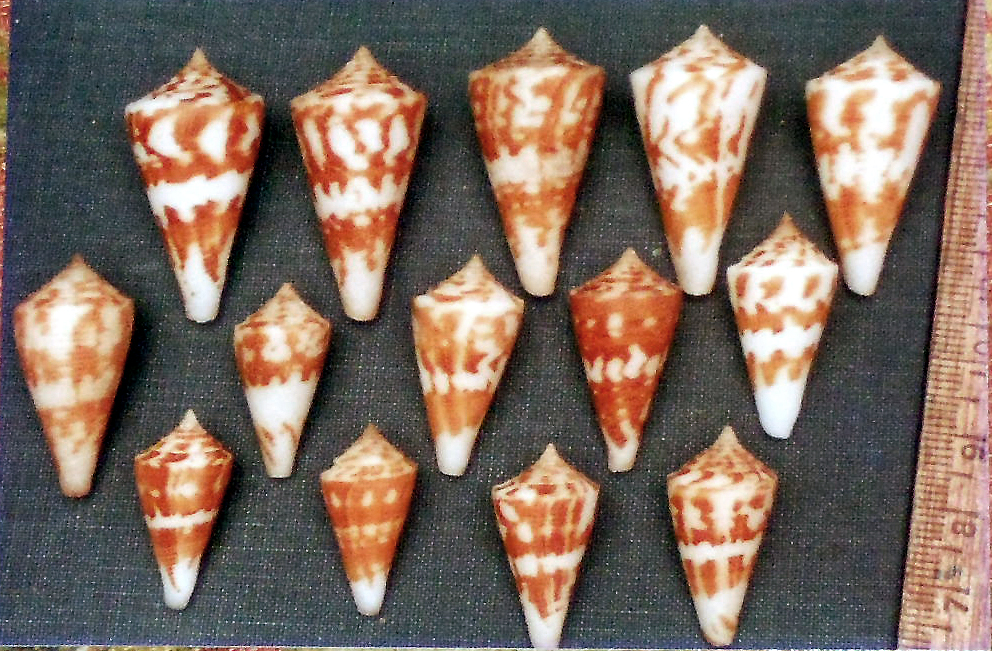
Dredged in deepwater, West coast Barbados. 1985. Barbenthos project.

Gulf of Mexico shells, usually trawled on the continental shelf, are larger than shells from the Eastern Caribbean islands close to the type locality.

Conus hunti, Wils and Moolenbeek 1979 is likely a variant of Conus villepinii. The two type localities, Barbados and Marie Galante de Guadeloupe, are only 355 kms. apart, in similarly deep water.

== Habitat ==
Minimum recorded depth is 25 m. Maximum recorded depth is 475 m.

Cone shells looking very similar in appearance to the shell presented as the type illustration of C.villepinii have been dredged off West coast of Barbados, Lesser Antilles at depths around 85 fms/510 feet.
