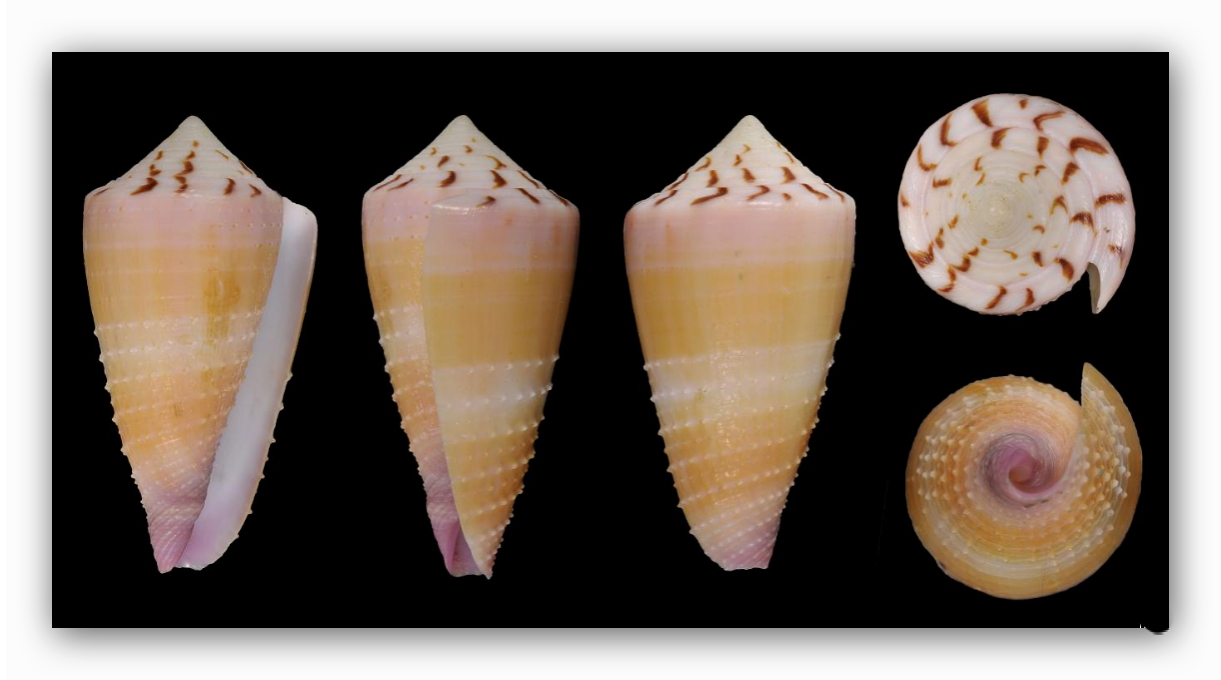
- Apertural and abapertural views of shell of Conus daucus Hwass in Bruguière, J.G., 1792
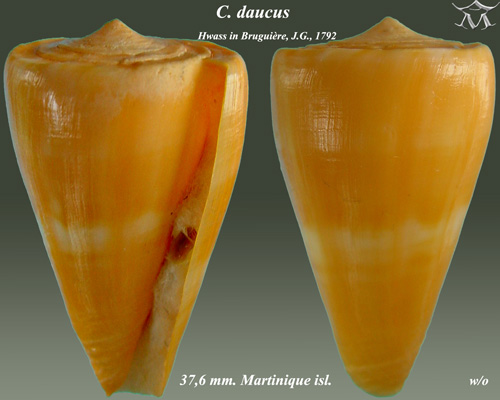

Conservation status
- Least Concern (IUCN 3.1)

Scientific classification
- Kingdom: Animalia
- Phylum: Mollusca
- Class: Gastropoda
- Subclass: Caenogastropoda
- Order: Neogastropoda
- Superfamily: Conoidea
- Family: Conidae
- Genus: Conus
- Species: C. daucus

Binomial name
- Conus daucus Hwass in Bruguière, 1792

Synonyms
- Conus (Dauciconus) daucus Hwass in Bruguière, 1792 · accepted, alternate representation; Conus arausiensis Reeve, 1843; Conus caribbaeus var. circumpunctatus Nowell-Usticke, 1968; Conus castus Reeve, 1844; Conus connectens A. Adams, 1855; Conus croceus G. B. Sowerby II, 1833; Conus daucus daucus Hwass in Bruguière, 1792; Conus daucus var. luteus Krebs, 1864 (invalid: junior homonym of Conus luteus G.B. Sowerby I, 1833); Conus daucus f. vikingorum Petuch, 1993; Conus mamillaris Green, 1830; Conus massemini (Monnier & Limpalaër, 2016); Conus norai da Motta & G. Raybaudi Massilia, 1992; Conus pastinaca Lamarck, 1810; Conus sanguinolentus Reeve, 1849 (invalid: junior homonym of Conus sanguinolentus Quoy & Gaimard, 1834); Conus vikingorum Petuch, 1993; Cucullus cardinalis Röding, 1798; Dauciconus daucus (Hwass in Bruguière, 1792); Dauciconus daucus daucus (Hwass in Bruguière, 1792); Dauciconus massemini Monnier & Limpalaër, 2016; Dauciconus vikingorum (Petuch, 1993)

= Conus daucus =

Species of sea snail

Conus daucus, common name the carrot cone, is a species of sea snail, a marine gastropod mollusk in the family Conidae, the cone snails and their allies.

Like all species within the genus Conus, these snails are predatory and venomous. They are capable of stinging humans, therefore live ones should be handled carefully.

There is one subspecies Conus daucus riosi Petuch, 1986

== Description ==
The shell length varies between 19 mm and 66 mm. The color of the shell is lemon- or orange-brown, grooved towards the base, with a pale, sometimes interrupted central band, and encircled throughout by rows of small chestnut spots often obsolete. The spire is sometimes maculated with pale chestnut.

== Distribution ==
Locus typicus: From localities cited by Hwass, Clench(1942) selected the Island of Guadeloupe.

This species occurs in the Caribbean Sea, the Gulf of Mexico, off Northeast Brazil, the North Atlantic Ridge, the Red Sea, and in the Indian Ocean off the Mascarene Basin.

== Habitat ==
The minimum recorded depth for this species is 0 m; the maximum recorded depth is 120 m.
