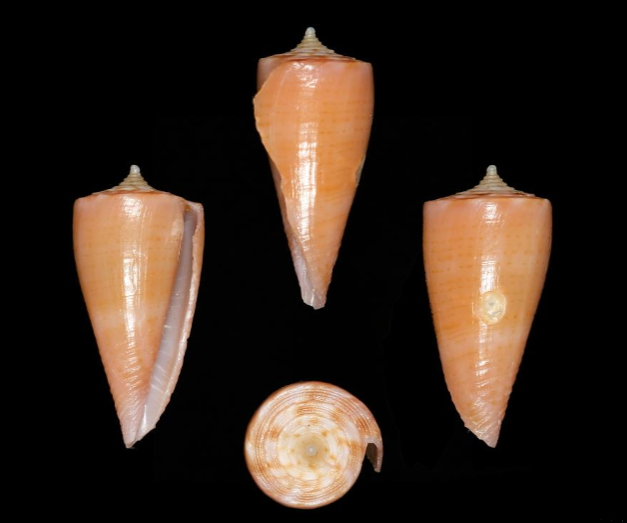
- Shell and protoconch of Conus eversoni (holotype at the Smithsonian Institution)

Conservation status
- Least Concern (IUCN 3.1)

Scientific classification
- Kingdom: Animalia
- Phylum: Mollusca
- Class: Gastropoda
- Subclass: Caenogastropoda
- Order: Neogastropoda
- Superfamily: Conoidea
- Family: Conidae
- Genus: Conus
- Species: C. eversoni

Binomial name
- Conus eversoni Petuch, 1987

Synonyms
- Attenuiconus eversoni (Petuch, 1987); Conus (Attenuiconus) eversoni Petuch, 1987 · accepted, alternate representation; Conus eversoni f. worki Petuch, 1998; Conus worki Petuch, 1998; Dauciconus eversoni (Petuch, 1987); Dauciconus worki (Petuch, 1998)

= Conus eversoni =

Species of sea snail

Conus eversoni is a species of sea snail, a marine gastropod mollusk in the family Conidae, the cone snails and their allies.

Like all species within the genus Conus, these snails are predatory and venomous. They are capable of stinging humans, therefore live ones should be handled carefully or not at all.

== Description ==
Original description: "Shell small, slender, tapered, with sharp-angled shoulder; spire flattened with elevated mamillate protoconch; body whorl smooth, polished, with 10 spiral cords around anterior end; spire whorl with 4 spiral cords; shell color dark reddish-brown with variable number of spiral rows of dark brown, tiny dots; paler reddish-brown band around mid-body; spire whorls with numerous evenly-spaced, dark brown flammules; early whorls and protoconch pale tan; interior of aperture purple."

The maximum recorded shell length is 18 mm.

== Distribution ==
Locus typicus: "South coast of Utila Island, Bay Islands, Honduras."

This species occurs in the Caribbean Sea off Honduras.

== Habitat ==
Minimum recorded depth is 20 m. Maximum recorded depth is 20 m.
