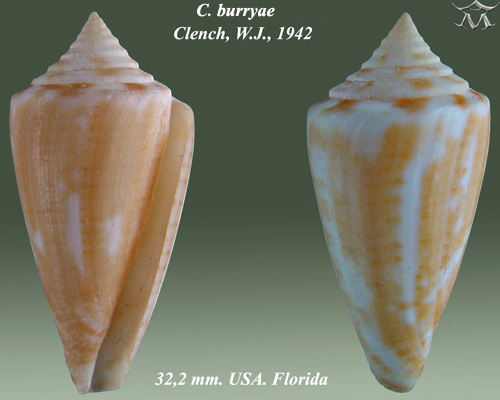
- Apertural and abapertural views of shell of Conus burryae Clench, W.J., 1942
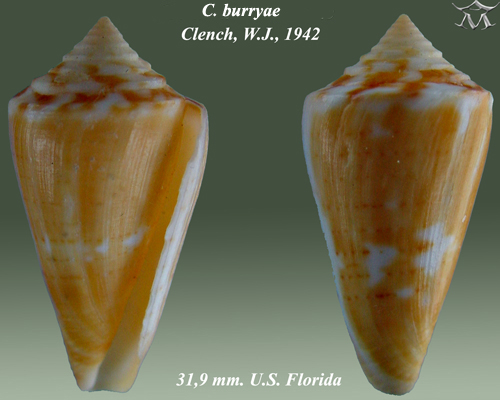

Scientific classification
- Kingdom: Animalia
- Phylum: Mollusca
- Class: Gastropoda
- Subclass: Caenogastropoda
- Order: Neogastropoda
- Superfamily: Conoidea
- Family: Conidae
- Genus: Conus
- Species: C. burryae

Binomial name
- Conus burryae Clench, 1942

Synonyms
- Conus (Dauciconus) burryae Clench, 1942 · accepted, alternate representation; Conus anabathrum antoni Cargile, 2011; Conus anabathrum burryae Clench, 1942; Conus floridanus burryae Clench, 1942; Conus floridanus tranthami Petuch, 1995; Dauciconus burryae (Clench, 1942); Gradiconus anabathrum burryae (Clench, 1942); Gradiconus anabathrum tranthami (Petuch, 1998); Gradiconus burryae (Clench, 1942); Gradiconus burryae burryae (Clench, 1942); Gradiconus burryae mazzolii Petuch & Sargent, 2011; Gradiconus mazzolii Petuch & Sargent, 2011; Gradiconus tortuganus Petuch & Sargent, 2011

= Conus burryae =

Species of sea snail

Conus burryae, common name Mrs Burry's cone, is a species of sea snail, a marine gastropod mollusk in the family Conidae, the cone snails and their allies.

Like all species within the genus Conus, these snails are predatory and venomous. They are capable of stinging humans, therefore live ones should be handled carefully or not at all.

== Description ==
The size of the shell varies between 20 mm and 35 mm.

== Distribution ==
Locus typicus: Off Lower Matecumbe Key, Lower Florida keys.

This species occurs in the Gulf of Mexico.
