= Conus poulosi =

Conservation status
- Least Concern (IUCN 3.1)

Scientific classification
- Kingdom: Animalia
- Phylum: Mollusca
- Class: Gastropoda
- Subclass: Caenogastropoda
- Order: Neogastropoda
- Superfamily: Conoidea
- Family: Conidae
- Genus: Conus
- Species: C. poulosi

Binomial name
- Conus poulosi Petuch, 1993

Synonyms
- Attenuiconus poulosi (Petuch, 1993); Conus (Attenuiconus) poulosi Petuch, 1993 · accepted, alternate representation; Dauciconus poulosi (Petuch, 1993)

Species of sea snail

Conus poulosi is a species of sea snail, a marine gastropod mollusk in the family Conidae, the cone snails and their allies.

Like all species within the genus Conus, these snails are predatory and venomous. They are capable of stinging humans, therefore live ones should be handled carefully or not at all.

== Distribution ==
This species occurs in the Caribbean Sea off Colombia.

== Description ==
The maximum recorded shell length is 50 mm.

== Habitat ==
Minimum recorded depth is 35 m. Maximum recorded depth is 53 m.
