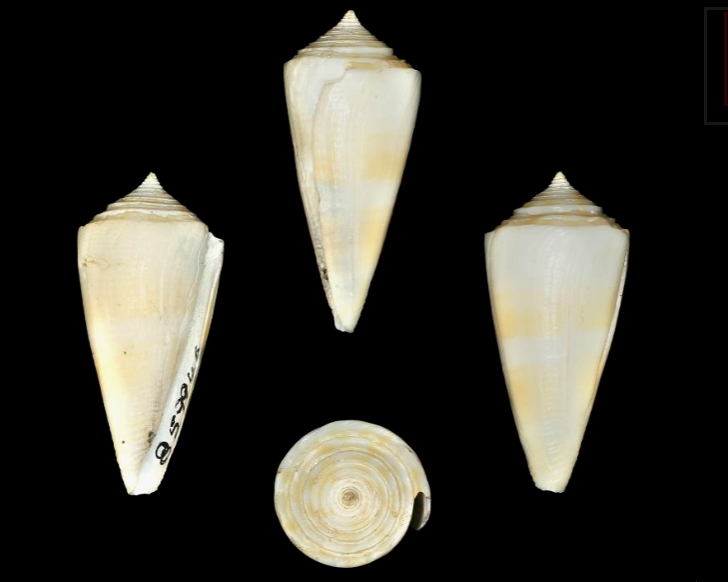
- Shell and protoconch of Conus honkeri (holotype at the Smithsonian Institution)

Conservation status
- Data Deficient (IUCN 3.1)

Scientific classification
- Kingdom: Animalia
- Phylum: Mollusca
- Class: Gastropoda
- Subclass: Caenogastropoda
- Order: Neogastropoda
- Superfamily: Conoidea
- Family: Conidae
- Genus: Conus
- Species: C. honkeri

Binomial name
- Conus honkeri Petuch, 1988

Synonyms
- Attenuiconus honkeri (Petuch, 1988); Conus (Attenuiconus) honkeri Petuch, 1988 · accepted, alternate representation; Dauciconus honkeri (Petuch, 1988)

= Conus honkeri =

Species of sea snail

Conus honkeri is a species of sea snail, a marine gastropod mollusk in the family Conidae, the cone snails and their allies.

Like all species within the genus Conus, these snails are predatory and venomous. They are capable of stinging humans, therefore live ones should be handled carefully or not at all.

== Distribution ==
Locus typicus: Los Monges Islands, Venezuela.

This species occurs in the Caribbean Sea off Venezuela, at a depth of 35 m.

== Description ==
The maximum recorded shell length is 37 mm.

== Taxonomy ==
Conus honkeri was described as a distinct species within the Conus genus, which comprises numerous venomous marine gastropods.

== Habitat ==
The species is found in the Caribbean Sea, specifically off the coast of Venezuela. The type locality, or locus typicus, is Los Monges Islands, Venezuela. Conus honkeri inhabits marine environments at a depth of approximately 35 meters.
