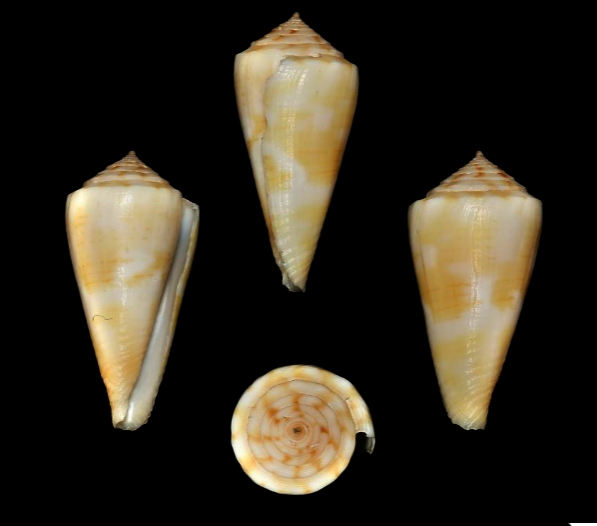
- Shell and protoconch of Conus aureonimbosus (holotype at the Smithsonian Institution)

Scientific classification
- Kingdom: Animalia
- Phylum: Mollusca
- Class: Gastropoda
- Subclass: Caenogastropoda
- Order: Neogastropoda
- Superfamily: Conoidea
- Family: Conidae
- Genus: Conus
- Species: C. aureonimbosus

Binomial name
- Conus aureonimbosus Petuch, 1987

Synonyms
- Attenuiconus aureonimbosus (Petuch, 1987); Conus (Attenuiconus) aureonimbosus Petuch, 1987 · accepted, alternate representation; Dauciconus aureonimbosus (Petuch, 1987)

= Conus aureonimbosus =

Species of sea snail

Conus aureonimbosus is a species of sea snail, a marine gastropod mollusk in the family Conidae, the cone snails and their allies.

These snails are predatory and venomous. They are capable of stinging humans, therefore live ones should be handled carefully or not at all.

== Description ==
Original description: "Shell thin, fragile, slender and elongated; body whorl highly polished; numerous fine spiral cords around anterior end; shoulder sharp, obsoletely coronated with low undulations and rounded bumps; spire low; protoconch needle-like, protracted, projecting above spire; shell color pale cream-yellow overlaid with large amorphous, flammules of bright golden-yellow; mid-body with white band containing rows of pale tan dots and dashes; spire whorls white with dark orange and tan flammules; protoconch yellow, interior of aperture white; anterior tip of shell yellow; periostracum thin, yellow, transparent."

The shell of a Conus Aureonimbosus can vary in size between 33 mm and 61 mm.

It has a light cream colored shell, with tan striations running throughout it.

== Distribution ==
Locus typicus: "(Dredged from) 150 metres depth

50 kilometres South of Apalachicola, Florida, USA."

This marine species occurs in the North Atlantic Ocean off Floridaat a depth of 150 metres.
