= Conasprella fenzani =

Scientific classification
- Kingdom: Animalia
- Phylum: Mollusca
- Class: Gastropoda
- Subclass: Caenogastropoda
- Order: Neogastropoda
- Superfamily: Conoidea
- Family: Conidae
- Genus: Conasprella
- Species: C. fenzani

Binomial name
- Conasprella fenzani (Petuch & Sargent, 2011)

Synonyms
- Conasprella (Kohniconus) fenzani (Petuch & Sargent, 2011) · accepted, alternate representation; Conus fenzani (Petuch & Sargent, 2011); Dauciconus fenzani Petuch & Sargent, 2011 (basionym); Kohniconus fenzani (Petuch & Sargent, 2011)

Species of gastropod

Conasprella fenzani is a species of sea snail, a marine gastropod mollusk in the family of Conidae, and the cone snails plus their allies. They are mainly located in the Pacific Ocean.

These cone snails are predatory and venomous. They are capable of stinging humans, therefore live ones should be handled carefully or not at all.

== Description ==
The size of the shell attains 47 millimeters and has a white color with various brown spots. They have an inverted cone-like shape with a large spike at the top.

== Distribution ==
This species occurs in Gulf of Chiriqui, Pacific Ocean near Panama. This species was first described by Petuch & Sargent in 2011.
