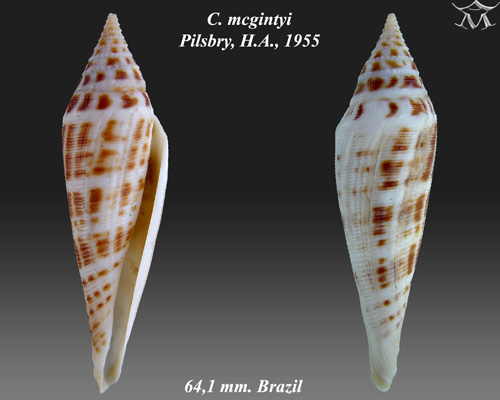
- Apertural and abapertural views of shell of Conasprella (Dalliconus) mcgintyi (Pilsbry, H.A., 1955)

Scientific classification
- Kingdom: Animalia
- Phylum: Mollusca
- Class: Gastropoda
- Subclass: Caenogastropoda
- Order: Neogastropoda
- Family: Conidae
- Genus: Conasprella
- Subgenus: Dalliconus; Tucker & Tenorio, 2009

Type species
- Conus mcgintyi Pilsbry, 1955

Synonyms
- Dalliconus J. K. Tucker & M. Tenorio, 2009

= Conasprella (Dalliconus) =

Subgenus of gastropods

Dalliconus is a subgenus of sea snails, marine gastropod mollusks in the genus Conasprella, family Conidae, the cone snails and their allies.

In the new classification of the family Conidae by Puillandre N., Duda T.F., Meyer C., Olivera B.M. & Bouchet P. (2015), Dalliconus has become a subgenus of Conasprella: Conasprella (Dalliconus) Tucker & Tenorio, 2009 represented as Conasprella Thiele, 1929

== Distinguishing characteristics ==
The Tucker & Tenorio 2009 taxonomy distinguishes Dalliconus from Conus in the following ways:

- Genus Conus sensu stricto Linnaeus, 1758

Shell characters (living and fossil species)

The basic shell shape is conical to elongated conical, has a deep anal notch on the shoulder, a smooth periostracum and a small operculum. The shoulder of the shell is usually nodulose and the protoconch is usually multispiral. Markings often include the presence of tents except for black or white color variants, with the absence of spiral lines of minute tents and textile bars.

Radular tooth (not known for fossil species)

The radula has an elongated anterior section with serrations and a large exposed terminating cusp, a non-obvious waist, blade is either small or absent and has a short barb, and lacks a basal spur.

Geographical distribution

These species are found in the Indo-Pacific region.

Feeding habits

These species eat other gastropods including cones.

- Genus Dalliconus Tucker & Tenorio, 2009

Shell characters (living and fossil species)

The shell is elongated to biconical in shape. The protoconch is paucispiral, the spire is scalariform. The anal notch is deep. The whorl tops on the teloconch are ornamented with two or more cords. The body whorl is conspicuously ornamented with has evenly spaced cords or sulci that continue the entire length. The periostracum is smooth, and no operculum has been observed.

Radular tooth (not known for fossil species)

The anterior sections of the radular tooth is shorter than the posterior section, and the blade and posterior blade are shirt and close together. The waist and corresponding waist fold are obvious. A basal spur is present, and the barb is short. The anterior end of the shaft fold is blunt.

Geographical distribution

These species are found in the West Atlantic region.

Feeding habits

These species are vermivorous (meaning that they prey on marine worms).

== Species list ==
This list of species is based on the information in the World Register of Marine Species (WoRMS) list. Species within the subgenus Dalliconus include:

- Dalliconus armiger (Crosse, 1858) is equivalent to Conasprella armiger Crosse, 1858
- Dalliconus bajanensis (Nowell-Usticke, 1968) is equivalent to Conasprella bajanensis Nowell-Usticke, 1968
- Dalliconus coletteae Petuch, 2013: synonym of Conasprella mcgintyi (Pilsbry, 1955)
- Dalliconus edpetuchi Monnier, Limpalaër, & Berschauer, 2015 accepted as Conasprella (Dalliconus) edpetuchi (Monnier, Limpalaër, Roux & Berschauer, 2015) represented as Conasprella edpetuchi Monnier, Limpalaër, & Berschauer, 2015
- Dalliconus guyanensis (Van Mol, 1973) is equivalent to Conasprella guyanensis Van Mol, 1973
- Dalliconus lenhilli (Cargile, 1998) is equivalent to Conasprella lenhilli Cargile, 1998
- Dalliconus mazei (Deshayes, 1874) is equivalent to Conasprella mazei Deshayes, 1874
- Dalliconus mcgintyi (Pilsbry, 1955) is equivalent to Conasprella mcgintyi Pilsbry, 1955
- Dalliconus pacei (Petuch, 1987) is equivalent to Conasprella pacei Petuch, 1987
- Dalliconus rainesae (McGinty, 1953) is equivalent to Conasprella rainesae McGinty, 1953
- Dalliconus roberti (Richard, 2009): synonym of Conasprella roberti (Richard, 2009)
- Dalliconus sauros (Garcia, 2006): synonym of Conasprella sauros (Garcia, 2006)

== Significance of "alternative representation" ==
Prior to 2009, all cone species were placed within the family Conidae and were placed in one genus, Conus. In 2009 however, J.K. Tucker and M.J. Tenorio proposed a classification system for the over 600 recognized species that were in the family. Their classification proposed 3 distinct families and 82 genera for the living species of cone snails, including the family Conilithidae. This classification was based upon shell morphology, radular differences, anatomy, physiology, cladistics, with comparisons to molecular (DNA) studies. Published accounts of genera within the Conidae (or Conilithidae) that include the genus Dalliconus include J.K. Tucker & M.J. Tenorio (2009), and Bouchet et al. (2011).

Testing in order to try to understand the molecular phylogeny of the Conidae was initially begun by Christopher Meyer and Alan Kohn, and is continuing, particularly with the advent of nuclear DNA testing in addition to mDNA testing.

However, in 2011, some experts still use the traditional classification, where all species are placed in Conus within the single family Conidae: for example, according to the current November 2011 version of the World Register of Marine Species, all species within the family Conidae are in the genus Conus. The binomial names of species in the 82 cone snail genera listed in Tucker & Tenorio 2009 are recognized by the World Register of Marine Species as "alternative representations." Debate within the scientific community regarding continues, and additional molecular phylogeny studies are being carried out in an attempt to clarify the issue.

All this has been superseded in 2015 by the new classification of the Conidae
