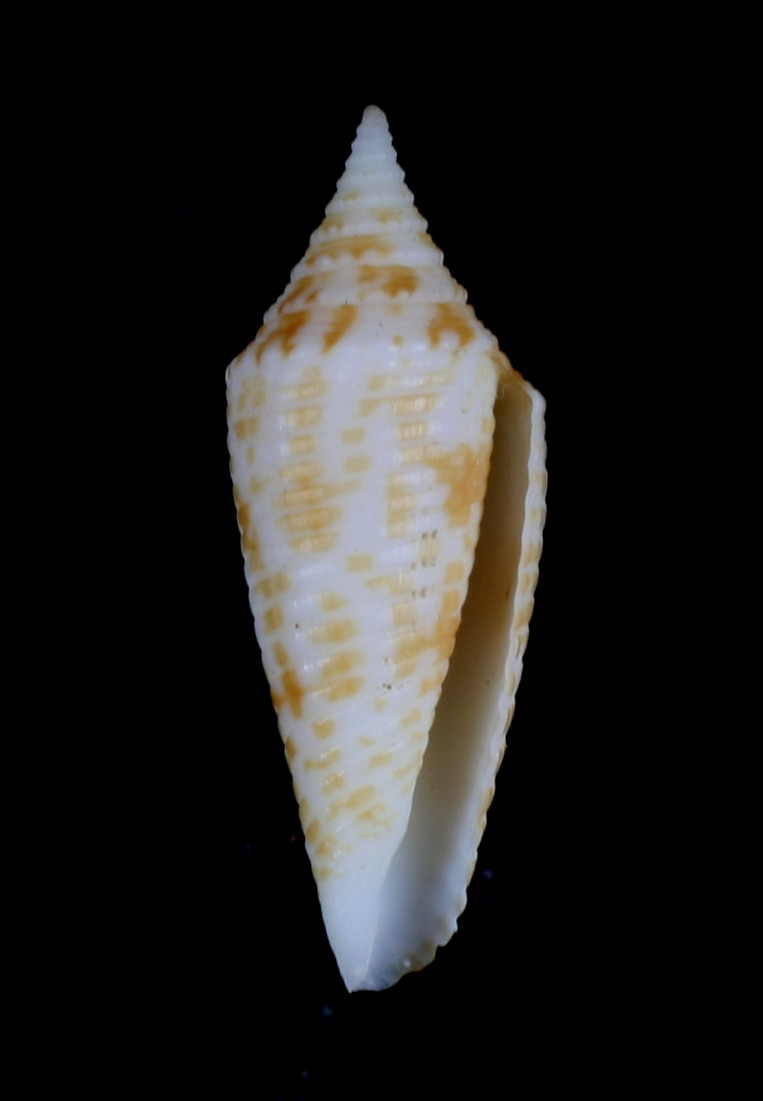
- Apertural view of shell of Conasprella hopwoodi Tomlin, 1837, measuring 25.5 mm in height, trawled at 80 fms. off Aliguay Island, in the Philippines

Scientific classification
- Kingdom: Animalia
- Phylum: Mollusca
- Class: Gastropoda
- Subclass: Caenogastropoda
- Order: Neogastropoda
- Family: Conidae
- Genus: Conasprella
- Subgenus: Fusiconus da Motta, 1991

Type species
- Conus longurionis Kiener, 1847

Synonyms
- Fusiconus da Motta, 1991; Viminiconus J. K. Tucker & M. Tenorio, 2009

= Conasprella (Fusiconus) =

Subgenus of gastropods

Fusiconus is a subgenus of sea snails, marine gastropod molluscs in the genus Conasprella, family Conidae, the cone snails and their allies.

In the new classification of the family Conidae by Puillandre N., Duda T.F., Meyer C., Olivera B.M. & Bouchet P. (2015), Fusiconus has become a subgenus of Conasprella: Conasprella (Fusiconus) Tucker & Tenorio, 2009 represented as Conasprella Thiele, 1929

== Distinguishing characteristics ==
The Tucker & Tenorio 2009 taxonomy distinguishes Fusiconus from Conus in the following ways:

- Genus Conus sensu stricto Linnaeus, 1758

Shell characters (living and fossil species)

The basic shell shape is conical to elongated conical, has a deep anal notch on the shoulder, a smooth periostracum and a small operculum. The shoulder of the shell is usually nodulose and the protoconch is usually multispiral. Markings often include the presence of tents except for black or white color variants, with the absence of spiral lines of minute tents and textile bars.

Radular tooth (not known for fossil species)

The radula has an elongated anterior section with serrations and a large exposed terminating cusp, a non-obvious waist, blade is either small or absent and has a short barb, and lacks a basal spur.

Geographical distribution

These species are found in the Indo-Pacific region.

Feeding habits

These species eat other gastropods including cones.

- Subgenus Fusiconus da Motta, 1991

Shell characters (living and fossil species)

The shell is fusiform in shape. The protoconch is paucispiral, the spire is scalariform. The anal notch is deep. The early and middle spire whorl are ornamented with a single cord. The body whorl is conspicuously ornamented with has evenly spaced cords or sulci that continue the entire length. The periostracum is smooth, and the operculum is small.

Radular tooth (not known for fossil species)

The anterior sections of the radular tooth is shorter than the posterior section, and the blade is short. The waist and corresponding waist fold are obvious. A basal spur is present, and the barb is short. A shaft fold is present. (Similar to Dalliconus, however the species of Fusiconus do not have a posterior blade.)

Geographical distribution

These species are found in the Indo-Pacific region.

Feeding habits

These species are vermivorous (meaning that they prey on marine worms).

== Species list ==
This list of species is based on the information in the World Register of Marine Species (WoRMS) list. Species within the genus Fusiconus include:

- Fusiconus dictator (Melvill, 1898) is equivalent to Conasprella dictator Melvill, 1898
- Fusiconus elegans (G.B. Sowerby III, 1895) is equivalent to Conasprella elegans G. B. Sowerby III, 1895
- Fusiconus hopwoodi (Tomlin, 1937) is equivalent to Conasprella hopwoodi Tomlin, 1937
- Fusiconus lentiginosus (Reeve, 1844) is equivalent to Conasprella lentiginosa Reeve, 1844
- Fusiconus lizarum (G. Raybaudi Massilia & da Motta, 1992) is equivalent to Conasprella lizarum (G. Raybaudi Massilia & da Motta, 1992)
- Fusiconus longurionis (Kiener, 1850) is equivalent to Conasprella longurionis Kiener, 1850
- Fusiconus stocki (Coomans & Moolenbeek, 1990) is equivalent to Conasprella stocki Coomans & Moolenbeek, 1990

== Significance of "alternative representation" ==
Prior to 2009, all cone species were placed within the family Conidae and were placed in one genus, Conus. In 2009 however, J.K. Tucker and M.J. Tenorio proposed a classification system for the over 600 recognized species that were in the family. Their classification proposed 3 distinct families and 82 genera for the living species of cone snails, including the family Conilithidae. This classification was based upon shell morphology, radular differences, anatomy, physiology, cladistics, with comparisons to molecular (DNA) studies. Published accounts of genera within the Conidae (or Conilithidae) that include the genus Fusiconus include J.K. Tucker & M.J. Tenorio (2009), and Bouchet et al. (2011).

Testing in order to try to understand the molecular phylogeny of the Conidae was initially begun by Christopher Meyer and Alan Kohn, and is continuing, particularly with the advent of nuclear DNA testing in addition to mDNA testing.

However, in 2011, some experts still use the traditional classification, where all species are placed in Conus within the single family Conidae: for example, according to the current November 2011 version of the World Register of Marine Species, all species within the family Conidae are in the genus Conus. The binomial names of species in the 82 cone snail genera listed in Tucker & Tenorio 2009 are recognized by the World Register of Marine Species as "alternative representations." Debate within the scientific community regarding continues, and additional molecular phylogeny studies are being carried out in an attempt to clarify the issue.

All this has been superseded in 2015 by the new classification of the Conidae
