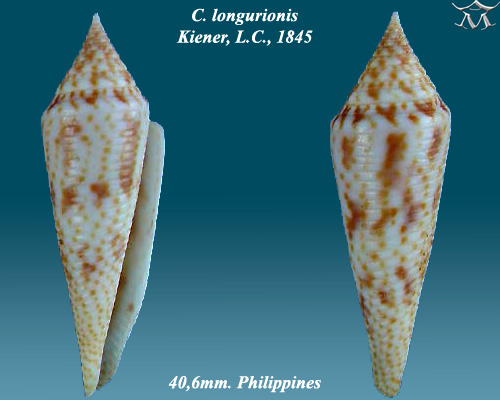
- Apertural and abapertural views of shell of Conasprella longurionis (Kiener, L.C., 1847)
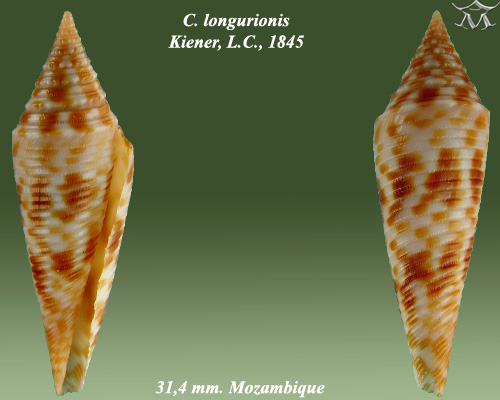

Conservation status
- Least Concern (IUCN 3.1)

Scientific classification
- Kingdom: Animalia
- Phylum: Mollusca
- Class: Gastropoda
- Subclass: Caenogastropoda
- Order: Neogastropoda
- Superfamily: Conoidea
- Family: Conidae
- Genus: Conasprella
- Species: C. longurionis

Binomial name
- Conasprella longurionis (Kiener, 1847)

Synonyms
- Conasprella (Fusiconus) longurionis (Kiener, 1847) · accepted, alternate representation; Conus kantanganus da Motta, 1982; Conus longurionis Kiener, 1847 (original combination); Fusiconus longurionis (Kiener, 1847)

= Conasprella longurionis =

Species of gastropod

Conasprella longurionis is a species of sea snail, a marine gastropod mollusk in the family Conidae, the cone snails and their allies.

Like all species within the genus Conasprella, these cone snails are predatory and venomous. They are capable of stinging humans, therefore live ones should be handled carefully or not at all.

== Description ==
The size of the shell varies between 28 mm and 46 mm.

== Distribution ==
This marine species occurs off East Africa and from Taiwan to Sri Lanka
