= Conasprella sauros =

Scientific classification
- Kingdom: Animalia
- Phylum: Mollusca
- Class: Gastropoda
- Subclass: Caenogastropoda
- Order: Neogastropoda
- Superfamily: Conoidea
- Family: Conidae
- Genus: Conasprella
- Species: C. sauros

Binomial name
- Conasprella sauros (Garcia, 2006)

Synonyms
- Conasprella (Dalliconus) sauros (Garcia, 2006) · accepted, alternate representation; Conus sauros Garcia, 2006 (original combination); Dalliconus sauros (Garcia, 2006)

Species of gastropod

Conasprella sauros is a species of sea snail, a marine gastropod mollusk in the family Conidae, the cone snails and their allies.

== Description ==
The size of the shell attains 30 mm, with a depth range of 48 to 140 m. Bearing some similarities to the Conasprella kitteredgei, but their coloration patterns have subtle differences.

== Distribution ==
This marine species occurs from Louisiana, United States to Campeche, Mexico.
