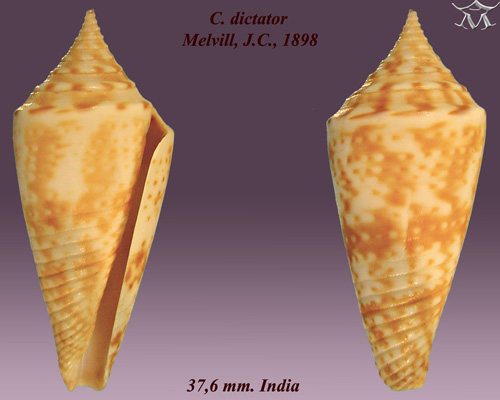
- Apertural and abapertural views of shell of Conasprella dictator (Melvill, J.C., 1898)
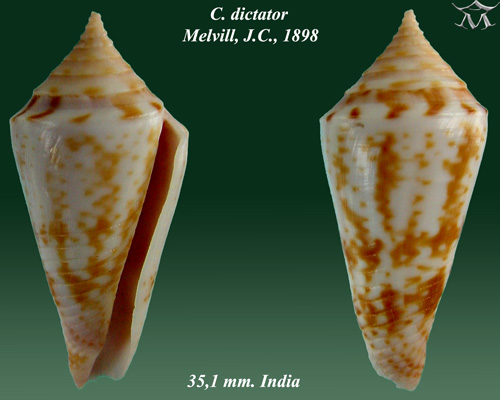

Conservation status
- Least Concern (IUCN 3.1)

Scientific classification
- Kingdom: Animalia
- Phylum: Mollusca
- Class: Gastropoda
- Subclass: Caenogastropoda
- Order: Neogastropoda
- Superfamily: Conoidea
- Family: Conidae
- Genus: Conasprella
- Species: C. dictator

Binomial name
- Conasprella dictator (Melvill, 1898)

Synonyms
- Conasprella (Fusiconus) dictator (Melvill, 1898) · accepted, alternate representation; Conus dictator Melvill, 1898 (original combination); Fumiconus dictator (Melvill, 1898); Fusiconus dictator (Melvill, 1898)

= Conasprella dictator =

Species of gastropod

Conasprella dictator is a species of sea snail, a marine gastropod mollusk in the family Conidae, the cone snails and their allies.

Like all species within the genus Conasprella, these snails are predatory and venomous. They are capable of stinging humans, therefore live ones should be handled carefully or not at all.

== Description ==
The size of the shell varies between 28 mm and 48 mm.

== Distribution ==
This species occurs in the Persian Gulf and Northwest Indonesia.
