= Conasprella lizarum =

Conservation status
- Least Concern (IUCN 3.1)

Scientific classification
- Kingdom: Animalia
- Phylum: Mollusca
- Class: Gastropoda
- Subclass: Caenogastropoda
- Order: Neogastropoda
- Superfamily: Conoidea
- Family: Conidae
- Genus: Conasprella
- Species: C. lizarum

Binomial name
- Conasprella lizarum (G. Raybaudi Massilia & da Motta, 1992)

Synonyms
- Conasprella (Fusiconus) lizarum (Raybaudi Massilia & da Motta, 1992) · accepted, alternate representation; Conus lizarum (Raybaudi Massilia & da Motta, 1992); Fumiconus lizarum (Raybaudi Massilia & da Motta, 1992); Fusiconus lizarum (Raybaudi Massilia & da Motta, 1992); Hermes lizarum G. Raybaudi Massilia & da Motta, 1992

Species of gastropod

Conasprella lizarum is a species of sea snail, a marine gastropod mollusk in the family Conidae, the cone snails and their allies.

Like all species within the genus Conasprella, these cone snails are predatory and venomous. They are capable of stinging humans, therefore live ones should be handled carefully or not at all.

== Description ==
The size of the shell varies between 20 mm and 36 mm.

== Distribution ==
This species occurs in the Indian Ocean off Somalia.
