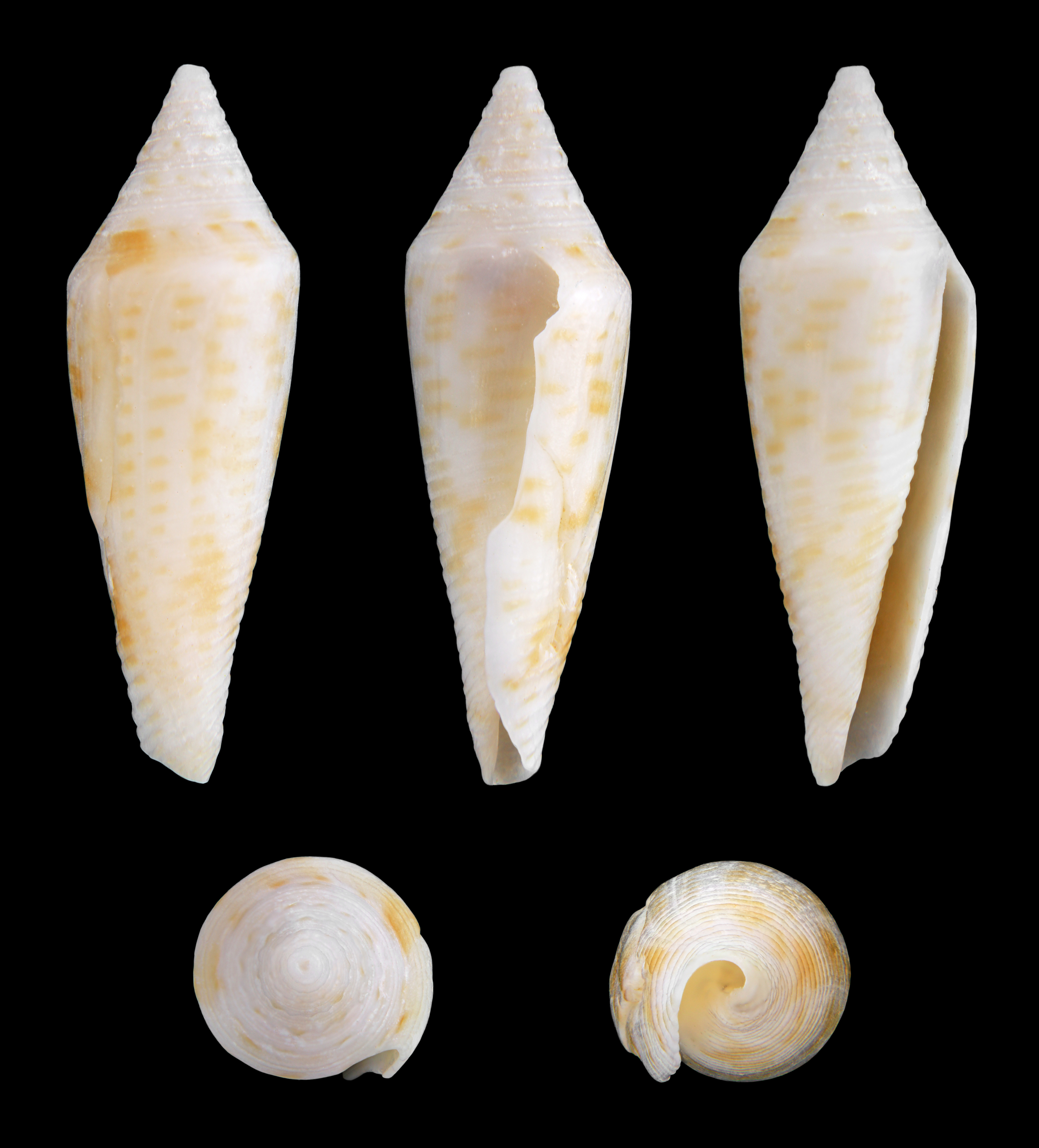
- Conasprella elegans Sowerby, G.B. III, 1895
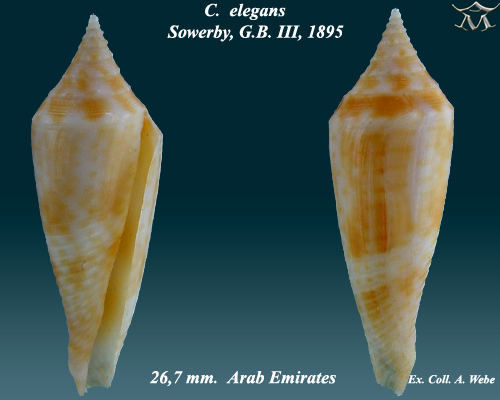

Scientific classification
- Kingdom: Animalia
- Phylum: Mollusca
- Class: Gastropoda
- Subclass: Caenogastropoda
- Order: Neogastropoda
- Superfamily: Conoidea
- Family: Conidae
- Genus: Conasprella
- Species: C. elegans

Binomial name
- Conasprella elegans (G. B. Sowerby III, 1895)

Synonyms
- Conasprella (Fusiconus) elegans (G. B. Sowerby III, 1895) · accepted, alternate representation; Conus aculeiformis var. torensis Sturany, 1904; Conus elegans G. B. Sowerby III, 1895; Conus elegans elegans G. B. Sowerby III, 1895; Conus elegans ramalhoi Coomans, Moolenbeek & Wils, 1986; Fusiconus elegans (G. B. Sowerby III, 1895); Fusiconus elegans elegans (G. B. Sowerby III, 1895)

= Conasprella elegans =

Species of gastropod

Conasprella elegans is a species of sea snail, a marine gastropod mollusk in the family Conidae, the cone snails and their allies.

Like all species within the genus Conasprella, these snails are predatory and venomous. They are capable of stinging humans, therefore live ones should be handled carefully or not at all.

== Subspecies ==
- Conasprella elegans elegans (G. B. Sowerby III, 1895) (synonym: Conus elegans elegans G. B. Sowerby III, 1895)
- Conasprella elegans ramalhoi (Coomans, Moolenbeek & Wils, 1986) (synonym: Conus elegans ramalhoi Coomans, Moolenbeek & Wils, 1986)

== Description ==
The length of the shell varies between 18 mm and 40 mm with a narrow coil like structure.

== Distribution ==
This marine species occurs from Somalia to Pakistan; and off Western Australia.
