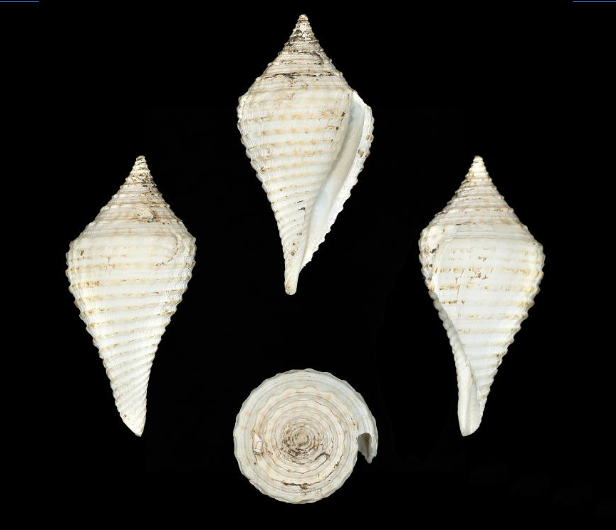
- Shell and protoconch of Conasprella armiger (holotype of the synonym Conus clarki at the Smithsonian Institution)

Conservation status
- Least Concern (IUCN 3.1)

Scientific classification
- Kingdom: Animalia
- Phylum: Mollusca
- Class: Gastropoda
- Subclass: Caenogastropoda
- Order: Neogastropoda
- Superfamily: Conoidea
- Family: Conidae
- Genus: Conasprella
- Species: C. armiger

Binomial name
- Conasprella armiger (Crosse, 1858)

Synonyms
- Conasprella (Dalliconus) armiger (Crosse, 1858) · accepted, alternate representation; Conus armiger Crosse, 1858 (original combination); Conus clarki Rehder & Abbott, 1951; Conus crenulatus Kiener, 1845 (invalid: junior homonym of Conus crenulatus Deshayes, 1835; Conus armiger is a replacement name); Conus frisbeyae Clench & Pulley, 1952; Dalliconus armiger (Crosse, 1858)

= Conasprella armiger =

Species of gastropod

Conasprella armiger is a species of sea snail, a marine gastropod mollusk in the family Conidae, the cone snails and their allies.

Like all species within the genus Conasprella, these snails are predatory and venomous. They are capable of stinging humans, therefore live ones should be handled carefully or not at all.

== Distribution ==
This species occurs in the Caribbean Sea, the Gulf of Mexico, and off the Lesser Antilles.

== Description ==
The maximum recorded shell length is 40 mm.

== Habitat ==
Minimum recorded depth is 35 m. Maximum recorded depth is 227 m.
