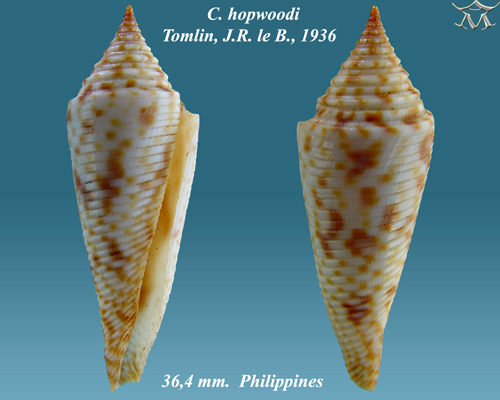
- Apertural and abapertural views of shell of Conasprella hopwoodi (Tomlin, J.R. le B., 1936)
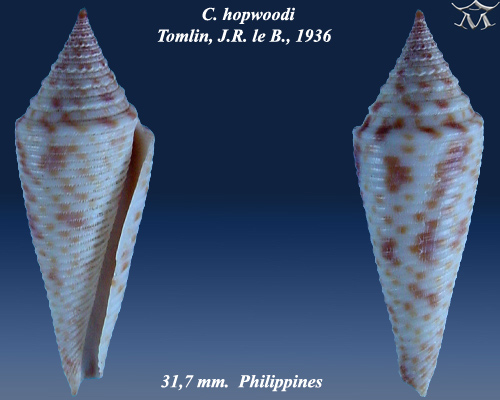

Conservation status
- Least Concern (IUCN 3.1)

Scientific classification
- Kingdom: Animalia
- Phylum: Mollusca
- Class: Gastropoda
- Subclass: Caenogastropoda
- Order: Neogastropoda
- Superfamily: Conoidea
- Family: Conidae
- Genus: Conasprella
- Species: C. hopwoodi

Binomial name
- Conasprella hopwoodi (Tomlin, 1937)

Synonyms
- Conasprella (Fusiconus) hopwoodi (Tomlin, 1937) · accepted, alternate representation; Conus gracilis G. B. Sowerby III, 1875 (invalid: junior homonym of Conus gracilis G.B. Sowerby I, 1823; Conus hopwoodi is a replacement name); Conus hopwoodi Tomlin, 1937 (original combination); Fusiconus hopwoodi (Tomlin, 1937)

= Conasprella hopwoodi =

Species of gastropod

Conasprella hopwoodi is a species of sea snail, a marine gastropod mollusk in the family Conidae, the cone snails and their allies.

Like all species within the genus Conasprella, these cone snails are predatory and venomous. They are capable of stinging humans, therefore live ones should be handled carefully or not at all.

== Description ==
The size of the shell varies between 25 mm and 32 mm.

== Distribution ==
This marine species occurs in Melanesia, Vanuatu, the South China Sea and off Papua New Guinea, Solomon Islands, and off Queensland, Australia
