= Conasprella lenhilli =

Conservation status
- Data Deficient (IUCN 3.1)

Scientific classification
- Kingdom: Animalia
- Phylum: Mollusca
- Class: Gastropoda
- Subclass: Caenogastropoda
- Order: Neogastropoda
- Superfamily: Conoidea
- Family: Conidae
- Genus: Conasprella
- Species: C. lenhilli

Binomial name
- Conasprella lenhilli (Cargile, 1998)

Synonyms
- Conasprella (Dalliconus) lenhilli (Cargile, 1998) · accepted, alternate representation; Conus lenhilli Cargile, 1998 (original combination); Dalliconus lenhilli (Cargile, 1998)

Species of gastropod

Conasprella lenhilli, common name the brown-flamed cone, is a species of sea snail, a marine gastropod mollusk in the family Conidae, the cone snails and their allies.

Like all species within the genus Conasprella, these cone snails are predatory and venomous. They are capable of stinging humans, therefore live ones should be handled carefully or not at all.

== Distribution ==
This species occurs in the Caribbean Sea off Turks & Caicos.

== Description ==
The maximum recorded shell length is 41.3 mm.

== Habitat ==
Minimum recorded depth is 440 m. Maximum recorded depth is 440 m.
