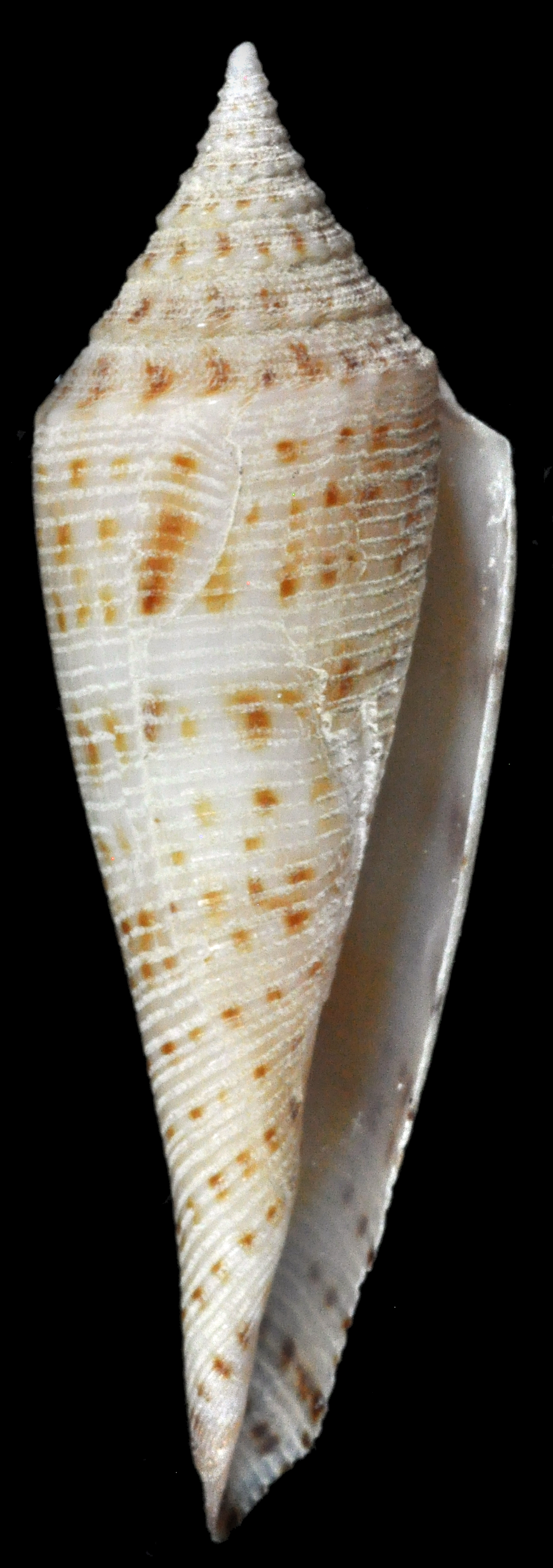
- Shell of Conasprella roberti (specimen at MNHN, Paris)

Scientific classification
- Kingdom: Animalia
- Phylum: Mollusca
- Class: Gastropoda
- Subclass: Caenogastropoda
- Order: Neogastropoda
- Superfamily: Conoidea
- Family: Conidae
- Genus: Conasprella
- Species: C. roberti

Binomial name
- Conasprella roberti (Richard, 2009)

Synonyms
- Conasprella (Dalliconus) roberti (Richard, 2009) · accepted, alternate representation; Conus roberti Richard, 2009 (original combination); Dalliconus roberti (Richard, 2009)

= Conasprella roberti =

Species of gastropod

Conasprella roberti is a species of sea snail, a marine gastropod mollusk in the family Conidae, the cone snails and their allies.

Like all species within the genus Conasprella, these cone snails are predatory and venomous. They are capable of stinging humans, therefore live ones should be handled carefully or not at all.

== Description ==
The size of the shell attains 50 mm.

== Distribution ==
This marine species occurs off Guadeloupe.
