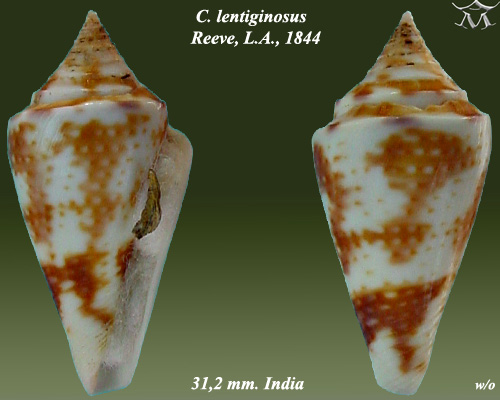
- Apertural and abapertural views of shell of Conasprella lentiginosa (Reeve, L.A., 1844)
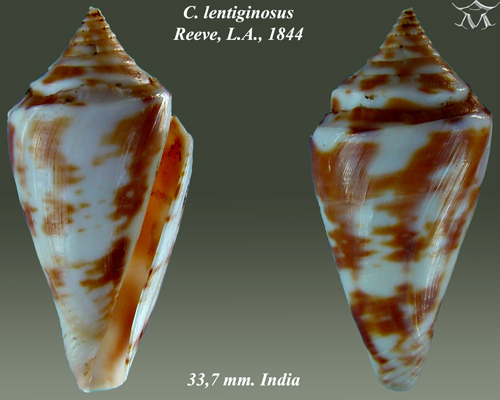

Conservation status
- Data Deficient (IUCN 3.1)

Scientific classification
- Kingdom: Animalia
- Phylum: Mollusca
- Class: Gastropoda
- Subclass: Caenogastropoda
- Order: Neogastropoda
- Superfamily: Conoidea
- Family: Conidae
- Genus: Conasprella
- Species: C. lentiginosa

Binomial name
- Conasprella lentiginosa (Reeve, 1844)

Synonyms
- Conasprella (Fusiconus) lentiginosa (Reeve, 1844) · accepted, alternate representation; Conus lentiginosus Reeve, 1844 (original combination; Fumiconus lentiginosus (Reeve, 1844); Fusiconus lentiginosus (Reeve, 1844)

= Conasprella lentiginosa =

Species of gastropod

Conasprella lentiginosa is a species of sea snail, a marine gastropod mollusk in the family Conidae, the cone snails and their allies.

Like all species within the genus Conasprella, these cone snails are predatory and venomous. They are capable of stinging humans, therefore live ones should be handled carefully or not at all.

== Description ==
The size of the shell varies between 25 mm and 38 mm.

== Distribution ==
Thiis marine species occurs off Southern India and off Sri Lanka.
