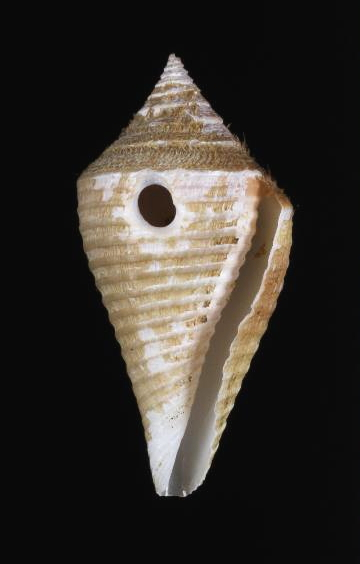
- Shell of Conasprella bajanensis (specimen in MNHN, Paris)

Conservation status
- Least Concern (IUCN 3.1)

Scientific classification
- Kingdom: Animalia
- Phylum: Mollusca
- Class: Gastropoda
- Subclass: Caenogastropoda
- Order: Neogastropoda
- Superfamily: Conoidea
- Family: Conidae
- Genus: Conasprella
- Species: C. bajanensis

Binomial name
- Conasprella bajanensis (Nowell-Usticke, 1968)

Synonyms
- Conasprella (Dalliconus) bajanensis (Nowell-Usticke, 1968) · accepted, alternate representation; Conasprella (Dalliconus) guyanensis (Van Mol, 1973); Conasprella guyanensis (Van Mol, 1973); Conus bajanensis Nowell-Usticke, 1968 (original combination); Conus pseudoaustini Nowell-Usticke, 1968; Conus guyanensis Van Mol, 1973 (original combination); Dalliconus bajanensis (Nowell-Usticke, 1968); Dalliconus guyanensis (Van Mol, 1973)

= Conasprella bajanensis =

Species of gastropod

Conasprella bajanensis is a species of sea snail, a marine gastropod mollusk in the family Conidae, the cone snails and their allies.

Like all species within the genus Conasprella, these snails are predatory and venomous. They are capable of stinging humans, therefore live ones should be handled carefully or not at all.

== Description ==
Despite its name associating this (obviously-continental-shelf) Cone shell with Barbados, it is highly likely the type material for this species was acquired from shrimpers at one time based in Barbados, but who used to trawl for shrimp off Guyana, some 300 miles South of Barbados.

The size of the shell varies between 20 mm and 35 mm.

== Distribution ==
This marine, continental-shelf species occurs off Tobago; also off French Guiana. Despite many deepwater dredgings over time, off West coast Barbados, by John Lewis(1960s), by Finn Sander(1970s) and by David Hunt(1980s)

this species is yet to be brought to light from 'Bajan' waters.
