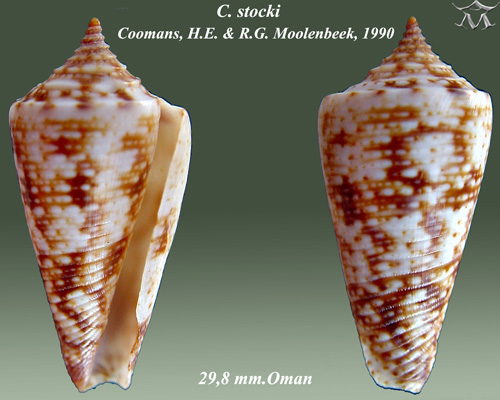
- Apertural and abapertural views of shell of Conasprella stocki (Coomans, H.E. & R.G. Moolenbeek, 1990)
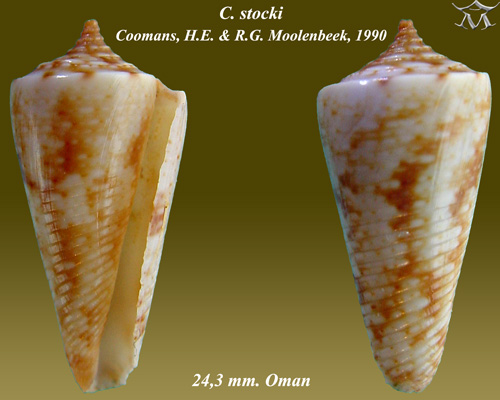

Scientific classification
- Kingdom: Animalia
- Phylum: Mollusca
- Class: Gastropoda
- Subclass: Caenogastropoda
- Order: Neogastropoda
- Superfamily: Conoidea
- Family: Conidae
- Genus: Conasprella
- Species: C. stocki

Binomial name
- Conasprella stocki (Coomans & Moolenbeek, 1990)

Synonyms
- Conasprella (Fusiconus) stocki (Coomans & Moolenbeek, 1990) · accepted, alternate representation; Conus stocki Coomans & Moolenbeek, 1990 (original combination); Fumiconus stocki (Coomans & Moolenbeek, 1990); Fusiconus stocki (Coomans & Moolenbeek, 1990)

= Conasprella stocki =

Species of gastropod

Conasprella stocki is a species of sea snail, a marine gastropod mollusk in the family Conidae, the cone snails and their allies.

Like all species within the genus Conasprella, these cone snails are predatory and venomous. They are capable of stinging humans, therefore live ones should be handled carefully or not at all.

== Description ==
The size of the shell varies between 26 mm and 45 mm.

== Distribution ==
This marine species occurs from the Gulf of Oman to Pakistan.
