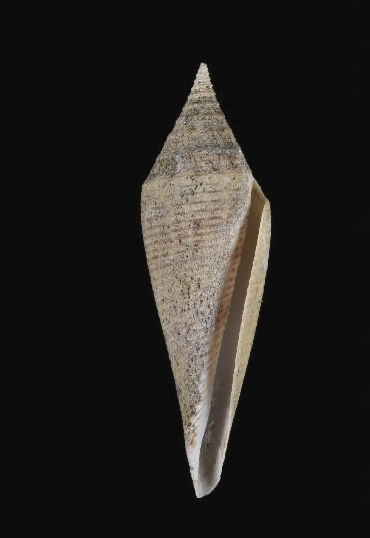
- Shell of Conasprella mcgintyi (specimen at MNHN, Paris)

Scientific classification
- Kingdom: Animalia
- Phylum: Mollusca
- Class: Gastropoda
- Subclass: Caenogastropoda
- Order: Neogastropoda
- Superfamily: Conoidea
- Family: Conidae
- Genus: Conasprella
- Species: C. mcgintyi

Binomial name
- Conasprella mcgintyi Pilsbry, 1955

Synonyms
- Conasprella (Dalliconus) mcgintyi (Pilsbry, 1955) · accepted, alternate representation; Conus coletteae (Petuch, 2013); Conus mcgintyi Pilsbry, 1955 (original combination); Dalliconus coletteae Petuch, 2013; Dalliconus mcgintyi (Pilsbry, 1955)

= Conasprella mcgintyi =

Species of gastropod

Conasprella mcgintyi is a species of predatory sea snail, a marine gastropod mollusk in the family Conidae, the cone snails, cone shells or cones.

Like all species within the genus Conasprella, these cone snails are predatory and venomous. They are capable of stinging humans; therefore, live ones should be handled carefully or not at all.

== Distribution ==
This is a western Atlantic species, which occurs from Florida to Brazil, as well as in the Gulf of Mexico.

== Description ==
Conasprella mcgintyi has elongate, many-whorled shell with a high conical spire. The external coloration is white with orange markings.

The maximum recorded shell length is 52.2 mm.

== Habitat ==
Minimum recorded depth is 55 m. Maximum recorded depth is 219 m.
