= Conasprella rainesae =

Conservation status
- Least Concern (IUCN 3.1)

Scientific classification
- Kingdom: Animalia
- Phylum: Mollusca
- Class: Gastropoda
- Subclass: Caenogastropoda
- Order: Neogastropoda
- Superfamily: Conoidea
- Family: Conidae
- Genus: Conasprella
- Species: C. rainesae

Binomial name
- Conasprella rainesae (McGinty, 1953)

Synonyms
- Conasprella (Dalliconus) rainesae (McGinty, 1953) · accepted, alternate representation; Conus rainesae McGinty, 1953 (original combination); Dalliconus rainesae (McGinty, 1953)

Species of gastropod

Conasprella rainesae, common name Maze's cone, is a species of sea snail, a marine gastropod mollusk in the family Conidae, the cone snails and their allies.

Like all species within the genus Conasprella, these cone snails are predatory and venomous. They are capable of stinging humans, therefore live ones should be handled carefully or not at all.

== Distribution ==
This species occurs in the Gulf of Mexico; in the Atlantic Ocean off Brazil.

== Description ==
The maximum recorded shell length is 25 mm.

== Habitat ==
Minimum recorded depth is 55 m. Maximum recorded depth is 110 m.
