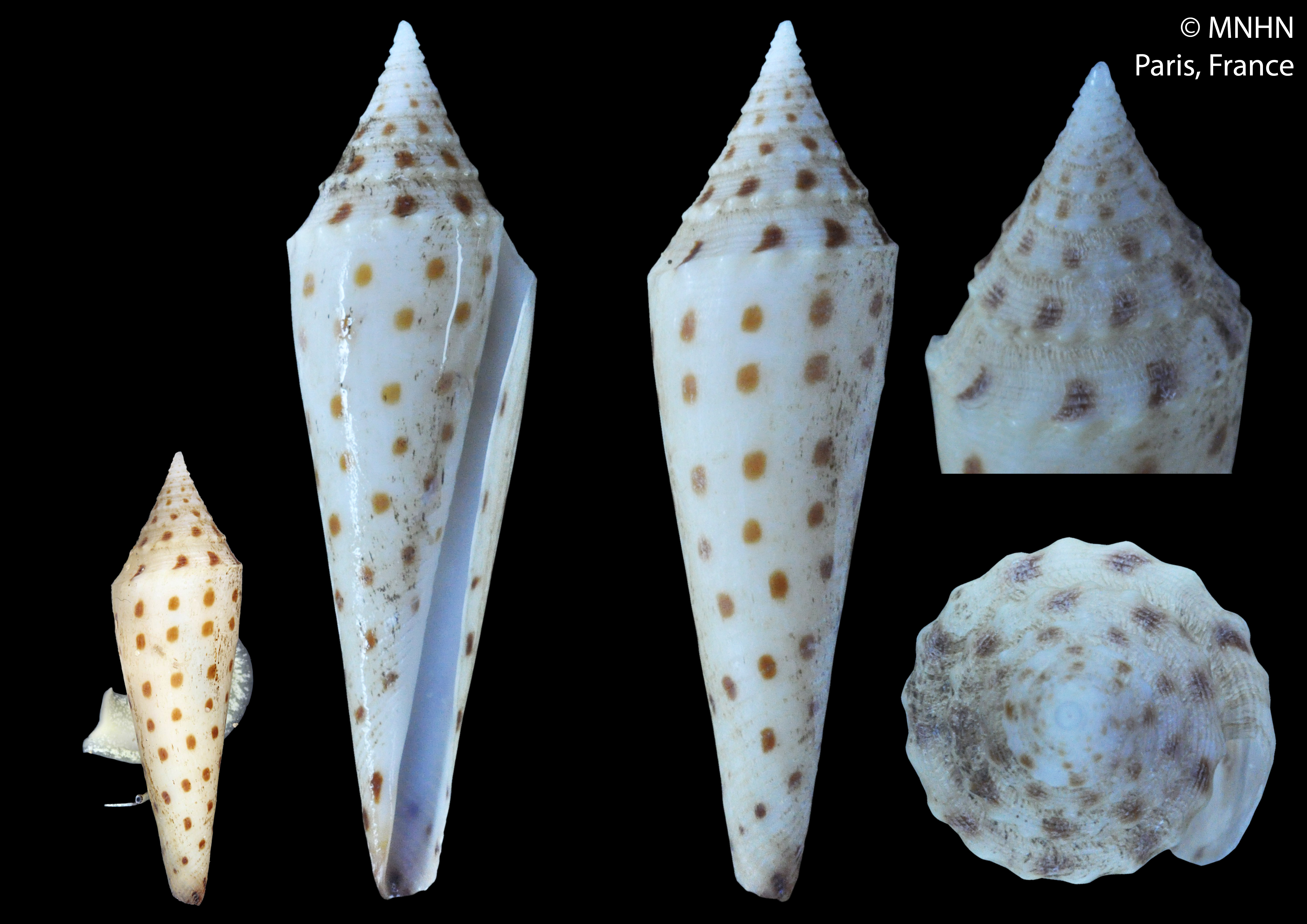
- Shell of Conasprella mazei (specimen at MNHN, Paris)

Scientific classification
- Kingdom: Animalia
- Phylum: Mollusca
- Class: Gastropoda
- Subclass: Caenogastropoda
- Order: Neogastropoda
- Superfamily: Conoidea
- Family: Conidae
- Genus: Conasprella
- Species: C. mazei

Binomial name
- Conasprella mazei Deshayes, 1874

Synonyms
- Conasprella (Dalliconus) mazei (Deshayes, 1874) · accepted, alternate representation; Conus mazei Deshayes, 1874 (original combination); Dalliconus mazei (Deshayes, 1874)

= Conasprella mazei =

Species of gastropod

Conasprella mazei, common name Maze's cone, is a species of predatory sea snail, a marine gastropod mollusk in the family Conidae, the cone snails, cone shells or cones.

Like all species within the genus Conasprella, these cone snails are predatory and venomous. They are capable of stinging humans, therefore live ones should be handled carefully or not at all.

== Description ==
Conasprella mazei is a very consistent species, displaying little variation throughout its range. The shell of this species is very elongate with an unusually high spire. The shell color is whitish with brown dot markings that can be almost square in shape.

The maximum recorded shell length is 59 mm.

== Distribution ==
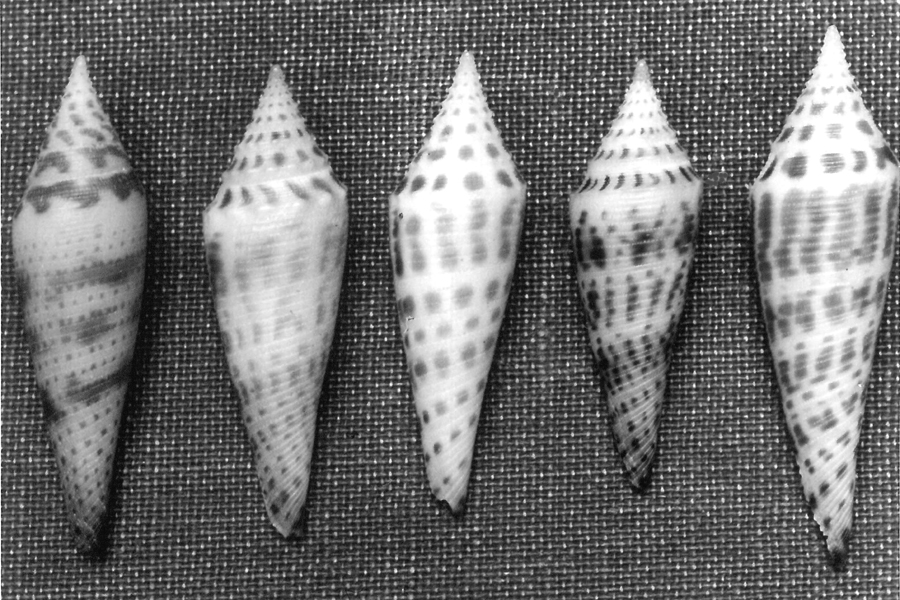
This is a western Atlantic species, occurring in the Caribbean Sea as far East as Barbados, and in the Gulf of Mexico.

== Habitat ==
This is a deepwater species. The minimum recorded depth is 152 m., and the maximum recorded depth is 549 m.
