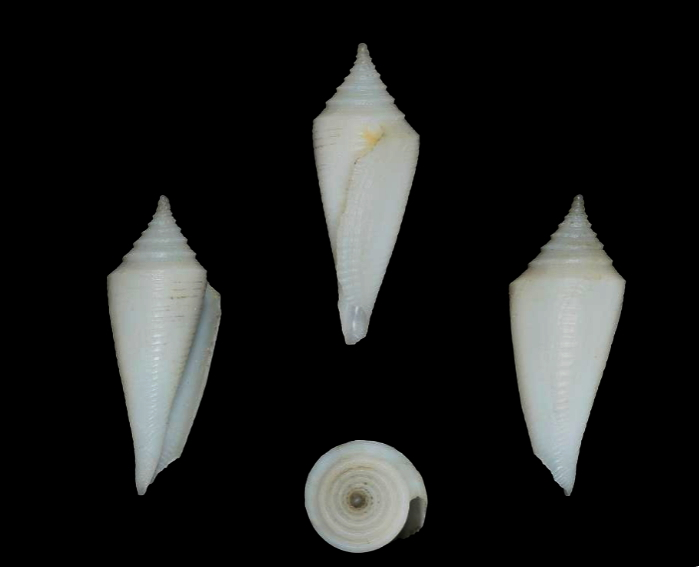
- Shell of Conasprella pacei (specimen at the Smithsonian Institution)

Scientific classification
- Kingdom: Animalia
- Phylum: Mollusca
- Class: Gastropoda
- Subclass: Caenogastropoda
- Order: Neogastropoda
- Superfamily: Conoidea
- Family: Conidae
- Genus: Conasprella
- Species: C. pacei

Binomial name
- Conasprella pacei (Petuch, 1987)

Synonyms
- Conasprella (Dalliconus) pacei (Petuch, 1987) · accepted, alternate representation; Conus pacei Petuch, 1987 (original combination); Dalliconus pacei (Petuch, 1987)

= Conasprella pacei =

Species of gastropod

Conasprella pacei is a species of sea snail, a marine gastropod mollusk in the family Conidae, the cone snails and their allies.

Like all species within the genus Conasprella, these cone snails are predatory and venomous. They are capable of stinging humans, therefore live ones should be handled carefully or not at all.

== Description ==
Original description: "Shell thin, fragile, delicate, elongated in shape; spire high, protracted; shoulder sharp-angled, smooth; protoconch large, 2 whorls; aperture narrow; body whorl ornamented with numerous incised spiral sulci, giving shell silky appearance; spire whorls ornamented with 3-4 thin, spiral threads; shell color pure white; interior of aperture white; periostracum thin, yellow, translucent."

The maximum recorded shell length is 20 mm.

== Distribution ==
Locus typicus: "Southern coast of Grand Bahama Island, Bahamas."

This marine species occurs in deep water off the Bahamas.

== Habitat ==
Minimum recorded depth is 250 m. Maximum recorded depth is 250 m.
