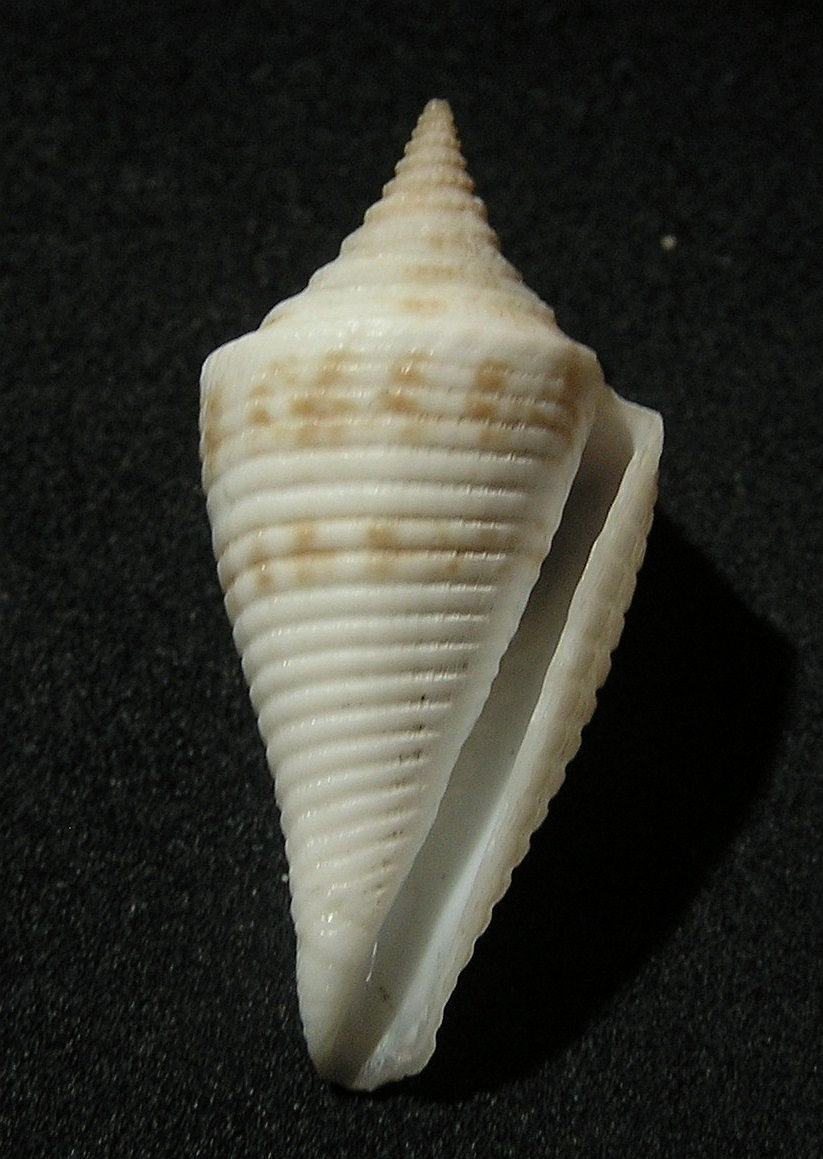
- Apertural view of a shell of Conasprella pagoda

Conservation status
- Least Concern (IUCN 3.1)

Scientific classification
- Domain: Eukaryota
- Kingdom: Animalia
- Phylum: Mollusca
- Class: Gastropoda
- Subclass: Caenogastropoda
- Order: Neogastropoda
- Superfamily: Conoidea
- Family: Conidae
- Genus: Conasprella
- Species: C. pagoda

Binomial name
- Conasprella pagoda (Kiener, 1845)

Synonyms
- Conasprella (Conasprella) pagoda ("Chenu, J.C." Kiener, L.C., 1845) accepted, alternate representation; Conus cancellatus Hirase, S., 1934; Conus pagodus Kiener, 1847 (original combination)

= Conasprella pagoda =

Species of gastropod

Conasprella pagoda, common name the pagoda cone, is a species of sea snail, a marine gastropod mollusc in the family Conidae, the cone snails and their allies.

Like all species within the genus Conasprella, these snails are predatory and venomous. They are capable of stinging humans, therefore live ones should be handled carefully or not at all.

== Description ==
The size of an adult shell varies between 26 mm and 50 mm. The shell is pear-shaped, broad and angulated at the shoulder, contracted towards the base. The body whorl is closely sulcate throughout, with the sulci striate. The intervening ridges are rounded. The spire is carinate, concavely elevated, with an acute and striate apex. The color of the shell is whitish, obscurely doubly banded with clouds of light chestnut, and the spire maculated with the same.

== Distribution ==
This species occurs in the Pacific Ocean off Japan, Vietnam, Philippines and New Caledonia.

== Gallery ==
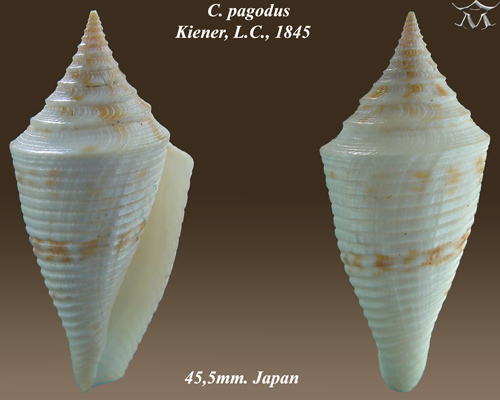
Conasprella pagoda Kiener, L.C., 1845

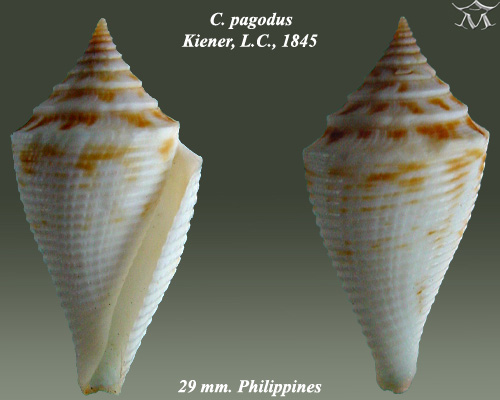
Conasprella pagoda Kiener, L.C., 1845
