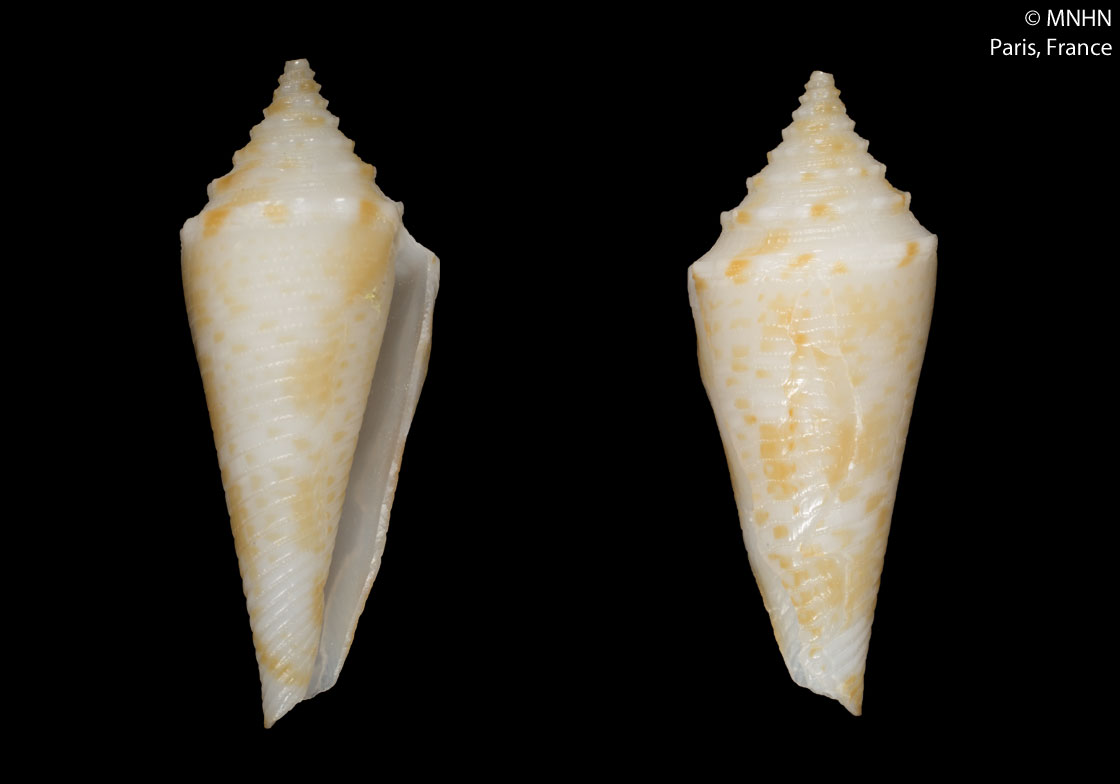
- Shell of Conasprella fijiensis (specimen at MNHN, Paris)

Conservation status
- Least Concern (IUCN 3.1)

Scientific classification
- Kingdom: Animalia
- Phylum: Mollusca
- Class: Gastropoda
- Subclass: Caenogastropoda
- Order: Neogastropoda
- Superfamily: Conoidea
- Family: Conidae
- Genus: Conasprella
- Species: C. fijiensis

Binomial name
- Conasprella fijiensis (Moolenbeek, Röckel & Bouchet, 2008)

Synonyms
- Bathyconus fijiensis (Moolenbeek, Röckel & Bouchet, 2008); Conasprella (Fusiconus) fijiensis (Moolenbeek, Röckel & Bouchet, 2008) · accepted, alternate representation; Conus fijiensis Moolenbeek, Röckel & Bouchet, 2008 (original combination)

= Conasprella fijiensis =

Species of gastropod

Conasprella fijiensis is a species of sea snail, a marine gastropod mollusk in the family Conidae, the cone snails and their allies.

Like all species within the genus Conus, these snails are predatory and venomous. They are capable of stinging humans, therefore live ones should be handled carefully or not at all.

== Description ==
The size of the shell varies between 12 mm and 18 mm.

== Distribution ==
This marine species occurs off Fiji and Tonga.
