= Conasprella joliveti =

Scientific classification
- Kingdom: Animalia
- Phylum: Mollusca
- Class: Gastropoda
- Subclass: Caenogastropoda
- Order: Neogastropoda
- Superfamily: Conoidea
- Family: Conidae
- Genus: Conasprella
- Species: C. joliveti

Binomial name
- Conasprella joliveti (Moolenbeek, Röckel & Bouchet, 2008)

Synonyms
- Bathyconus joliveti (Moolenbeek, Röckel & Bouchet, 2008); Conasprella (Fusiconus) joliveti (Moolenbeek, Röckel & Bouchet, 2008) · accepted, alternate representation; Conus joliveti Moolenbeek, Röckel & Bouchet, 2008 (original combination)

Species of gastropod

Conasprella joliveti is a species of sea snail, a marine gastropod mollusk in the family Conidae, the cone snails and their allies.

Like all species within the genus Conasprella, these cone snails are predatory and venomous. They are capable of stinging humans, therefore live ones should be handled carefully or not at all.

== Description ==
The size of the shell varies between 29 mm and 35 mm.

== Distribution ==
This marine species occurs off Fiji, Vanuatu, the Solomon Islands, and Indonesia.
