= Conasprella gordyi =

Scientific classification
- Kingdom: Animalia
- Phylum: Mollusca
- Class: Gastropoda
- Subclass: Caenogastropoda
- Order: Neogastropoda
- Superfamily: Conoidea
- Family: Conidae
- Genus: Conasprella
- Species: C. gordyi

Binomial name
- Conasprella gordyi (Röckel & Bondarev, 2000)

Synonyms
- Conasprella (Conasprella) gordyi (Röckel & Bondarev, 2000) . accepted, alternate representation; Conus gordyi Röckel & Bondarev, 2000 (original combination); Kioconus gordyi Röckel, D. & I. Bondarev, 2000, "1999"

Species of gastropod

Conasprella gordyi is a species of sea snail, a marine gastropod mollusk in the family Conidae, the cone snails and their allies.

Like all species within the genus Conasprella, these snails are predatory and venomous. They are capable of stinging humans, therefore live ones should be handled carefully or not at all.

== Description ==
The size of the shell varies between 16 mm and 20 mm.

== Distribution ==
This species occurs in the Indian Ocean off the Mascarenes.
