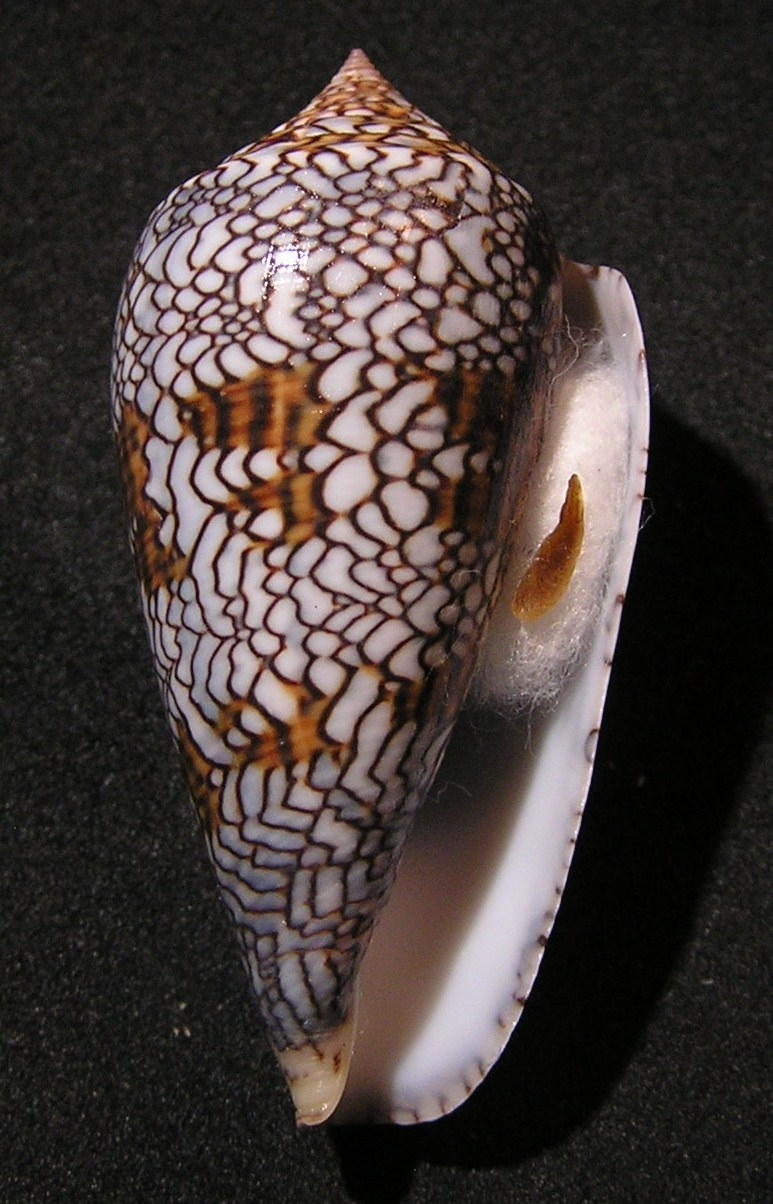
- Apertural view of shell of Cylinder textile (Linnaeus, 1758) form archiepiscopus, which: synonym of Conus textile Linnaeus, 1758

Scientific classification
- Kingdom: Animalia
- Phylum: Mollusca
- Class: Gastropoda
- Subclass: Caenogastropoda
- Order: Neogastropoda
- Family: Conidae
- Genus: Conus
- Subgenus: Cylinder; Montfort, 1810

Type species
- Conus textile Linnaeus, 1758

Synonyms
- Cylinder Montfort, 1810

= Conus (Cylinder) =

Subgenus of gastropods

Cylinder is a subgenus of sea snails, marine gastropod mollusks in the genus Conus, in the family Conidae, the cone snails and their allies.

In the new classification of the family Conidae by Puillandre N., Duda T.F., Meyer C., Olivera B.M. & Bouchet P. (2015), Cylinder has become a subgenus of Conus: Conus (Cylinder) Petuch & Sargent, 2012 represented as Conus Thiele, 1929. The same study found Cylinder to be polyphyletic, but morphologically consistent, possibly corresponding to grades. Conus ammiralis, Conus canonicus and Conus dalli cluster with the type species Conus textile, the others form a separate clade.

== Distinguishing characteristics ==
The Tucker & Tenorio 2009 taxonomy distinguishes Cylinder from Conus in the following ways:

- Genus Conus Linnaeus, 1758

Shell characters (living and fossil species)

The basic shell shape is conical to elongated conical, has a deep anal notch on the shoulder, a smooth periostracum and a small operculum. The shoulder of the shell is usually nodulose and the protoconch is usually multispiral. Markings often include the presence of tents except for black or white color variants, with the absence of spiral lines of minute tents and textile bars.

Radular tooth (not known for fossil species)

The radula has an elongated anterior section with serrations and a large exposed terminating cusp, a non-obvious waist, blade is either small or absent and has a short barb, and lacks a basal spur.

Geographical distribution

These species are found in the Indo-Pacific region.

Feeding habits

These species eat other gastropods including cones.

- Subgenus Cylinder Montfort, 1810

Shell characters (living and fossil species)

The shell is ovate to elongated in shape. The protoconch is multispiral, the spire is conical to convex in shape. The anal notch is deep. The shell is conspicuously ornamented with rows of tents or textile bars. The periostracum is smooth, and the operculum is small.

Radular tooth (not known for fossil species)

The anterior section of the radula is substantially more elongated than the posterior section. The waist is not obvious. A basal spur is absent, and the barb is short. The blade and a terminating cusp are present.

Geographical distribution

All but one species in this genus are found in the Indo-Pacific region; Cylinder dalli is found in the Eastern Pacific region.

Feeding habits

These species are molluscivorous (meaning that they prey on other mollusks).

== Species list ==
This list of species is based on the information in the World Register of Marine Species (WoRMS) list. Species within the genus Cylinder include:

- Cylinder abbas (Hwass in Bruguière, 1792): synonym of Conus abbas Hwass in Bruguière, 1792
- Cylinder ammiralis Linnaeus, 1758: synonym of Conus (Cylinder) ammiralis Linnaeus, 1758, represented as Conus ammiralis Linnaeus, 1758
- Cylinder aureus (Hwass in Bruguière, 1792): synonym of Conus aureus Hwass in Bruguière, 1792
- Cylinder barbieri (G. Raybaudi Massilia, 1995): synonym of Conus barbieri G. Raybaudi Massilia, 1995
- Cylinder bengalensis (Okutani, 1968): synonym of Conus bengalensis (Okutani, 1968)
- Cylinder biancae (Bozzetti, 2010): synonym of Conus biancae Bozzetti, 2010
- Cylinder canonicus (Hwass in Bruguière, 1792): synonym of Conus canonicus Hwass in Bruguière, 1792
- Cylinder dalli (Stearns, 1873): synonym of Conus dalli Stearns, 1873
- Cylinder dondani (Kosuge, 1981): synonym of Conus dondani Kosuge, 1981
- Cylinder erythrostoma (Meuschen, 1787): synonym of Miniaceoliva miniacea (Röding, 1798)
- Cylinder gloriamaris (Chemnitz, 1777): synonym of Conus gloriamaris Chemnitz, 1777
- Cylinder glorioceanus (Poppe & Tagaro, 2009): synonym of Conus glorioceanus Poppe & Tagaro, 2009
- Cylinder legatus (Lamarck, 1810): synonym of Conus legatus Lamarck, 1810
- Cylinder nodulosus (G.B. Sowerby II, 1864): synonym of Conus nodulosus G.B. Sowerby II, 1864
- Cylinder pacificus (Moolenbeek & Röckel, 1996): synonym of Conus pacificus Moolenbeek & Röckel, 1996
- Cylinder patmartii Massemin & Balleton, 2024: synonym of Conus patmartii (Massemin & Balleton, 2024)
- Cylinder paulucciae (G. B. Sowerby III, 1887): synonym of Cylinder aureus paulucciae (G. B. Sowerby III, 1887) represented as Conus aureus paulucciae G. B. Sowerby III, 1887
- Cylinder priscai Bozzetti, 2012: synonym of Conus (Cylinder) priscai Bozzetti, 2012 represented as Conus priscai (Bozzetti, 2012)
- Cylinder retifer (Menke, 1829): synonym of Conus retifer Menke, 1829
- Cylinder scottjordani (Poppe, Monnier & Tagaro, 2012): synonym of Conus (Cylinder) scottjordani (Poppe, Monnier & Tagaro, 2012) represented as Conus scottjordani (Poppe, Monnier & Tagaro, 2012)
- Cylinder tagaroae Limpalaër & Monnier, 2013: synonym of Conus (Cylinder) tagaroae (Limpalaër & Monnier, 2013) represented as Conus tagaroae (Limpalaër & Monnier, 2013)
- Cylinder telatus (Reeve, 1848): synonym of Conus telatus Reeve, 1848
- Cylinder textile (Linnaeus, 1758): synonym of Conus textile Linnaeus, 1758
- Cylinder victoriae (Reeve, 1843): synonym of Conus victoriae Reeve, 1843
