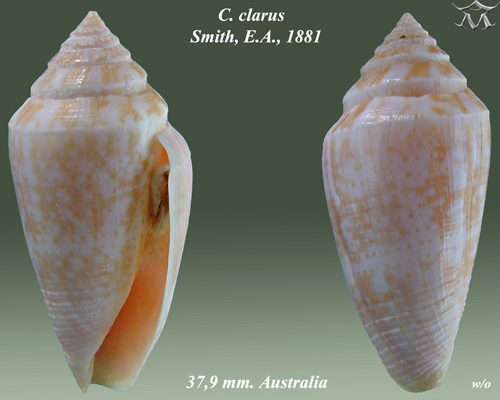
- Apertural and abapertural views of shell of Austroconus clarus

Scientific classification
- Kingdom: Animalia
- Phylum: Mollusca
- Class: Gastropoda
- Subclass: Caenogastropoda
- Order: Neogastropoda
- Family: Conidae
- Genus: Conus
- Subgenus: Austroconus; Tucker & Tenorio, 2009

Synonyms
- Austroconus Tucker & Tenorio, 2009

= Conus (Austroconus) =

Genus of gastropods

Austroconus is a taxon of sea snails, marine gastropod mollusks in the family Conidae. Although formerly described as a distinct subgenus, it is currently considered as an alternative representation of the cone snail genus, Conus.

== Distinguishing characteristics ==
The Tucker & Tenorio 2009 taxonomy distinguishes Austroconus from Conus in the following ways:

- Genus Conus sensu stricto Linnaeus, 1758

Shell characters (living and fossil species)

The basic shell shape is conical to elongated conical, has a deep anal notch on the shoulder, a smooth periostracum and a small operculum. The shoulder of the shell is usually nodulose and the protoconch is usually multispiral. Markings often include the presence of tents except for black or white color variants, with the absence of spiral lines of minute tents and textile bars.

Radular tooth (not known for fossil species)

The radula has an elongated anterior section with serrations and a large exposed terminating cusp, a non-obvious waist, blade is either small or absent and has a short barb, and lacks a basal spur.

Geographical distribution

These species are found in the Indo-Pacific region.

Feeding habits

These species eat other gastropods including cones.

- Genus Austroconus Tucker & Tenorio, 2009

Shell characters (living and fossil species)

The protoconch is paucispiral with 1.5 whorls, the shoulder is carinate, the body whorl is sulcate, the whorl tops have cords, there are no nodules on the body and no dentiform plait. The shell has an anterior notch which is usually conspicuous and well developed, and a shallow anal notch. The periostracum is smooth, and the operculum is small.

Radular tooth (not known for fossil species)

The anterior section of the radula is usually shorter than posterior section. The blade is moderately long and covers at least one-half the length of the anterior section of the radular tooth. A basal spur is present, the barb is short. Serrations usually occur in just one or two rows.

Geographical distribution

These species are endemic to Australia.

Feeding habits

These species are presumed to be vermivorous (meaning that they prey on marine worms) bases on the aspect of the radular tooth.

== Species ==
Prior to 2009, all species within the family Conidae were placed in one genus, Conus. In 2009 however, J.K. Tucker and M.J. Tenorio proposed a classification system for the over 600 recognized species that were in the family. Their classification proposed 3 distinct families and 82 genera for the living species of cone snails. This classification was based upon shell morphology, radular differences, anatomy, physiology, cladistics, with comparisons to molecular (DNA) studies. Published accounts of genera within the Conidae that include the genus Austroconus include J.K. Tucker & M.J. Tenorio (2009), and Bouchet et al. (2011).

Testing in order to try to understand the molecular phylogeny of the Conidae was initially begun by Christopher Meyer and Alan Kohn, and is continuing, particularly with the advent of nuclear DNA testing in addition to mDNA testing.

Many authorities continue to use the traditional classification, where all species are placed in Conus within the single family Conidae including the current (October 2022) version of the World Register of Marine Species. The binomial names of species in the 82 cone snail genera listed in Tucker & Tenorio 2009 are recognized by the World Register of Marine Species as "alternative representations." Debate within the scientific community regarding this issue continues, and additional molecular phylogeny studies are being carried out in an attempt to clarify the issue.

In 2015, in the Journal of Molluscan Studies, Puillandre, Duda, Meyer, Olivera & Bouchet presented a new classification for the old genus Conus. Using 329 species, the authors carried out molecular phylogenetic analyses. The results suggested that the authors should place all cone snails in a single family, Conidae, containing four genera: Conus, Conasprella, Profundiconus and Californiconus. The authors group 85% of all known cone snail species under Conus, They recognize 57 subgenera within Conus, and 11 subgenera within the genus Conasprella.

The three species formerly classified in the genus Africonus are now considered as "alternate representations" of species in the genus Conus:

- Austroconus clarus (E.A. Smith, 1881) is represented as Conus clarus E. A. Smith, 1881
- Austroconus cyanostoma (A. Adams, 1855) is represented as Conus cyanostoma A. Adams, 1855
- Austroconus sydneyensis (G.B. Sowerby III, 1887) is represented as Conus sydneyensis G. B. Sowerby III, 1887
