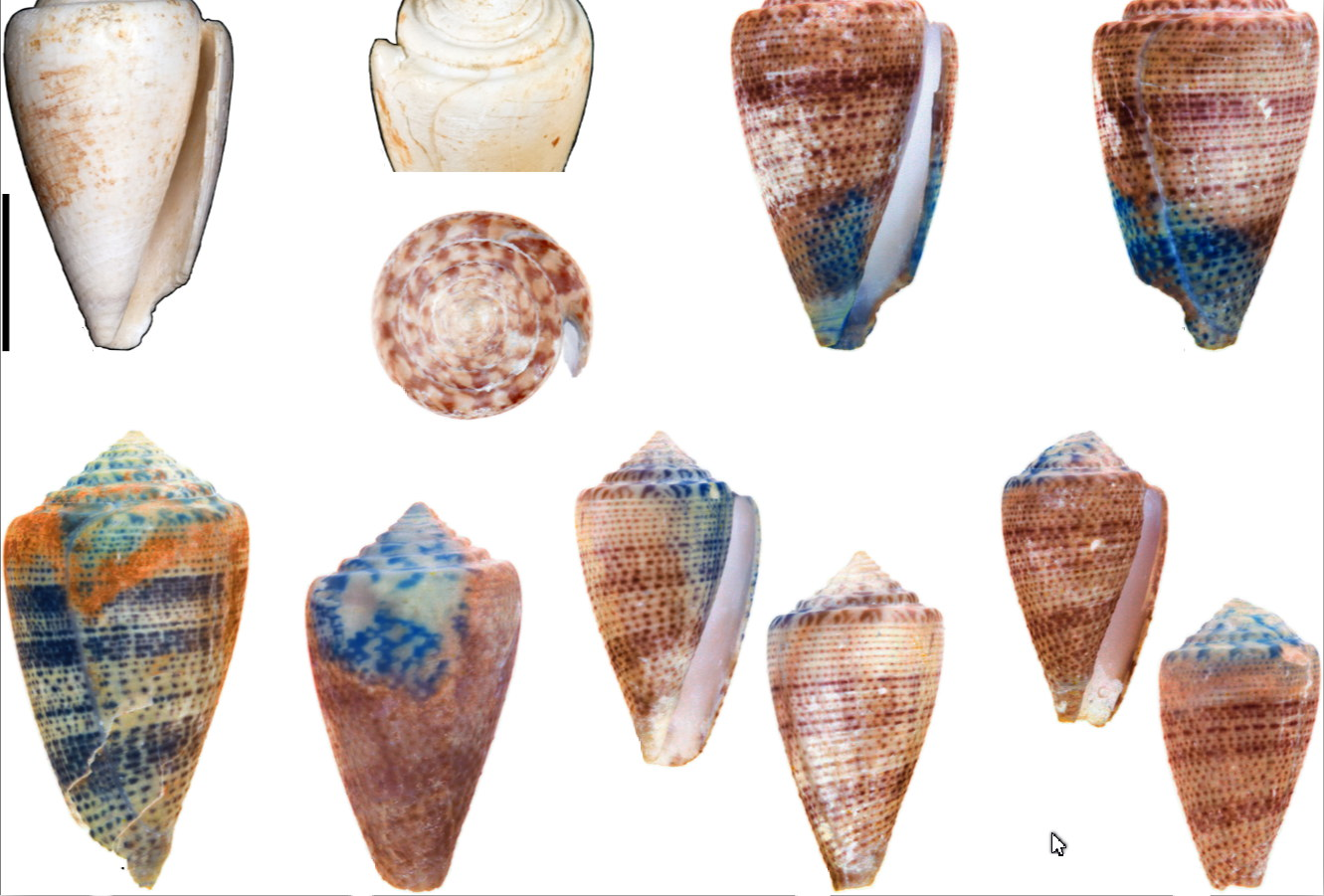
- Several shells of Conus lombardii; the colored are reversed images of specimens photographed under UV light. Scale bar is 1 cm and pertains to all images.

Conservation status
- Extinct

Scientific classification
- Kingdom: Animalia
- Phylum: Mollusca
- Class: Gastropoda
- Subclass: Caenogastropoda
- Order: Neogastropoda
- Superfamily: Conoidea
- Family: Conidae
- Genus: Conus
- Species: †C. lombardii

Binomial name
- †Conus lombardii Hendricks, 2015

Synonyms
- † Conus (Spuriconus) lombardii Hendricks, 2015 · accepted, alternate representation

= Conus lombardii =

Species of sea snail

Conus lombardii is an extinct species of sea snail, a marine gastropod mollusk in the family Conidae, the cone snails, cone shells or cones.

== Description ==
The size of the shell attains 29.5 millimetres (1.16 in). It is similar to Conus kaesleri and Conus spurius.

== Distribution ==
This marine species of cone snail is known only in the fossil state from the Neogene of the Dominican Republic.
