= CNF-Sr3 =

CNF-Sr3, also known as conorfamide-Sr3, is a toxin derived from the venom duct of the sea snail Conus spurius. CNF-Sr3 is an inhibitor of the Shaker channel, a subtype of the voltage-gated potassium channels.

== Etymology and Source ==
CNF-Sr3 (conorfamide-Sr3) is found in the venom duct of the vermivorous Conus spurius, a marine snail from the Gulf of Mexico.

== Chemistry ==
=== Structure ===
CNF-Sr3 consists of 15 amino acid residues and has no cysteine residues. The monoisotopic mass of the protein is 1726.77 Dalton. The sequence of CNF-Sr3 is ATSGPMGWLPVFYRF.

=== Family ===
CNF-Sr3 belongs to the conorfamide family, together with CNF-Sr1 5, CNF-Sr2 1 and CNF-Vc1. CNF-Sr1, CNF-Sr2 and CNF-Sr3 are found in the venom duct of Conus spurius. CNF-Vc1 is found in the venom of Conus victoriae. Conorfamides share sequence similarity with FMRFamide and other FMRFa-related peptides (FaRPs). All conorfamides are disulfide-poor conotoxins.

=== Homology ===
CNF-Sr3 shares 73.3% sequence similarity with CNF-Sr1 and 31.0% sequence similarity with CNF-Sr2. CNF-Sr3 has three additional amino acid residues at the amino-terminus and Leu instead of Val at position 8 compared with CNF-Sr12.

The amino acid sequences of the conorfamides are displayed below:

| Conorfamide-Sr1 | Gly-Pro-Met-Gly-Trp-Val-Pro-Val-Phe-Tyr-Arg-Phe |
| Conorfamide-Sr2 | Gly-Pro-Met-Glu-Asp-Pro-Leu-Glu-Ile-Ile-Arg-Ile |
| Conorfamide-Sr3 | Ala-Thr-Ser-Gly-Pro-Met-Gly-Trp-Leu-Pro-Val-Phe-Tyr-Arg-Phe |
| Conorfamide-Vc1 | His-Ser-Gly-Phe-Leu-Leu-Ala-Trp-Ser-Gly-Pro-Arg-Asn-Arg-Phe-Val-Arg-Phe |

== Target ==
CNF-Sr3 blocks Shaker K+ channels with a moderate affinity, with a Kd = 2.7 ± 0.35 μM (mean ± SEM). The Shaker channel is a subtype of voltage-gated potassium channels. Inhibition of the Shaker channels by CNF-Sr3 is reversible. This toxin does not block Shab, Shaw, Shal and Eag channels.
