= Canonicus (disambiguation) =

Canonicus (c. 1565–1647) was a Native American chief of the Narragansett.

Canonicus may also refer to:

- USS Canonicus, the name of several United States Navy ships
- Canonicus-class monitor, a class of nine ships built for the Union Navy during the American Civil War
- Conus canonicus, common name the tiger cone, a species of sea snail
- Father John Canonicus, who directed the building of St. Joseph's Cathedral, Criciúma, Brazil
- Canon (priest), from Latin canonicus

== See also ==
- Canon Digital IXUS, a camera
