= C. aureus =

C. aureus may refer to:

- Calodactylodes aureus, the Indian golden gecko, a gecko species known only from the Tirumala hills in the Eastern Ghats of India
- Canis aureus, the golden jackal, a medium-sized species of canid which inhabits north and north-eastern Africa, south-eastern and central Europe, Asia minor, the Middle East and south east Asia
- Cirrhitichthys aureus, a hawkfish species from the Indo-West Pacific
- Conus aureus, a sea snail species

== Synonyms ==
- Crotalus aureus, a synonym for Crotalus mitchellii, the speckled rattlesnake, Mitchell's rattlesnake or white rattlesnake, a venomous pitviper species found in the Southwestern United States, and in northern Mexico.

== See also ==
- Aureus (disambiguation)
