= RPRFamide =

Identifiers
| 3D model (JSmol) | Interactive image |
- InChI: InChI=1S/C26H43N11O4/c27-17(9-4-12-33-25(29)30)24(41)37-14-6-11-20(37)23(40)35-18(10-5-13-34-26(31)32)22(39)36-19(21(28)38)15-16-7-2-1-3-8-16/h1-3,7-8,17-20H,4-6,9-15,27H2,(H2,28,38)(H,35,40)(H,36,39)(H4,29,30,33)(H4,31,32,34)/t17-,18-,19-,20-/m0/s1 Key: ZCURAMQBXXPVOI-MUGJNUQGSA-N
- SMILES: N[C@@]([H])(CCCNC(=N)N)C(=O)N1[C@@]([H])(CCC1)C(=O)N[C@@]([H])(CCCNC(=N)N)C(=O)N[C@@]([H])(Cc1ccccc1)C(=O)N

Properties
| Chemical formula | C_{26}H_{43}N_{11}O_{4} |
| Molar mass | 573.703 g·mol^{−1} |
- Except where otherwise noted, data are given for materials in their standard state (at 25 °C [77 °F], 100 kPa). Infobox references

RPRFamide is a neurotoxin belonging to the conorfamide family of neuropeptides, which can be found in the venom of cone snails.

== Etymology and source ==
RPRFamide is a toxin from the carnivorous marine cone snail Conus textile, a predatory species that mainly lives in tropical waters. The venom of marine cone snails contains a diverse variety of toxins, which include conotoxins.

RPRFamide belongs to the family of conotoxins, more specifically to the conorfamide family or RFamide family which are peptides that target neuronal ion channels in their prey.

== Chemistry ==
The sequence for this toxin is identified as RPRF (R = arginine, P = proline, and F = phenylalanine). An amide group (-NH_{2}) is located at the terminal end (C-terminus). The presence of this group is paramount for its biological activity as it enhances its interaction with ion channels.

The short length, the C-terminal Arg–Phe–NH_{2} (RFa) motif, and the lack of cysteines clearly distinguishes these peptides from conotoxins and categorises them as cono-RFamides.

== Target ==
Two main molecular targets have been discovered for RPRFamide. Firstly, it targets the acid sensing ion channel 3 (ASIC3), involved in the pain pathway. Secondly, it can target and inhibit nicotinic acetylcholine receptors (nAChRs), specifically the alpha-7 subtype.

== Mode of action ==
The RPRFamide peptide modulates ASIC3, a proton-gated ion channel that is sensitive to acidic conditions and involved in pain perception. This channel is a proton-gated sodium channel involved in nociception in response to acidic environments in a tissue, such as muscle fatigue. The toxin enhances ASIC3 currents, leading to increased pain signalling, particularly in response to acidic stimuli. This explains why RPRFamide can induce pain, particularly muscle pain, through the activation of ASIC3 channels. The peptide delays the desensitization of ASIC3 channels, keeping them open longer and allowing sustained ion flow, which increases sensitivity to pain stimuli and prolongs the nociceptive effect.

Studies show that injecting cono-RFamide into mice muscle leads to increased acid induced pain. Additionally, studies showed that RPRFamide causes an increase in excitability of dorsal root ganglion (DRG) neurons.

The RPRFamide also modulates nACh receptors by inhibiting them, specifically the alpha-7 and muscle-type nAChRs. These receptors are ligand-gated ion channels that mediate fast synaptic transmission in the nervous system and are involved in neuromuscular function. The toxin's inhibitory effect prevents the influx of ions that would normally result from acetylcholine binding, disrupting neurotransmission and impairing muscle contraction, depending on the receptor subtype.

== Toxicity ==
The toxicity of RPRFamide has yet to be assessed in humans. However, available literature suggests that ASIC3 channels are expressed in muscle pain receptors, leading to extreme, long-lasting pain when injected into muscle tissue in mice, particularly when administered with an acidic solution.

== Treatment ==
Currently, no available literature describes a method to counteract the neurotoxic activity of RPRFamide.

== Therapeutic use ==
The therapeutic potential of RPRFamide has yet to be fully assessed. Some authors have discussed the neurotoxin's modulation of ASIC3 and nAChRs receptors, suggesting that further research could explore its role in pain modulation, including potential treatments for chronic pain.
