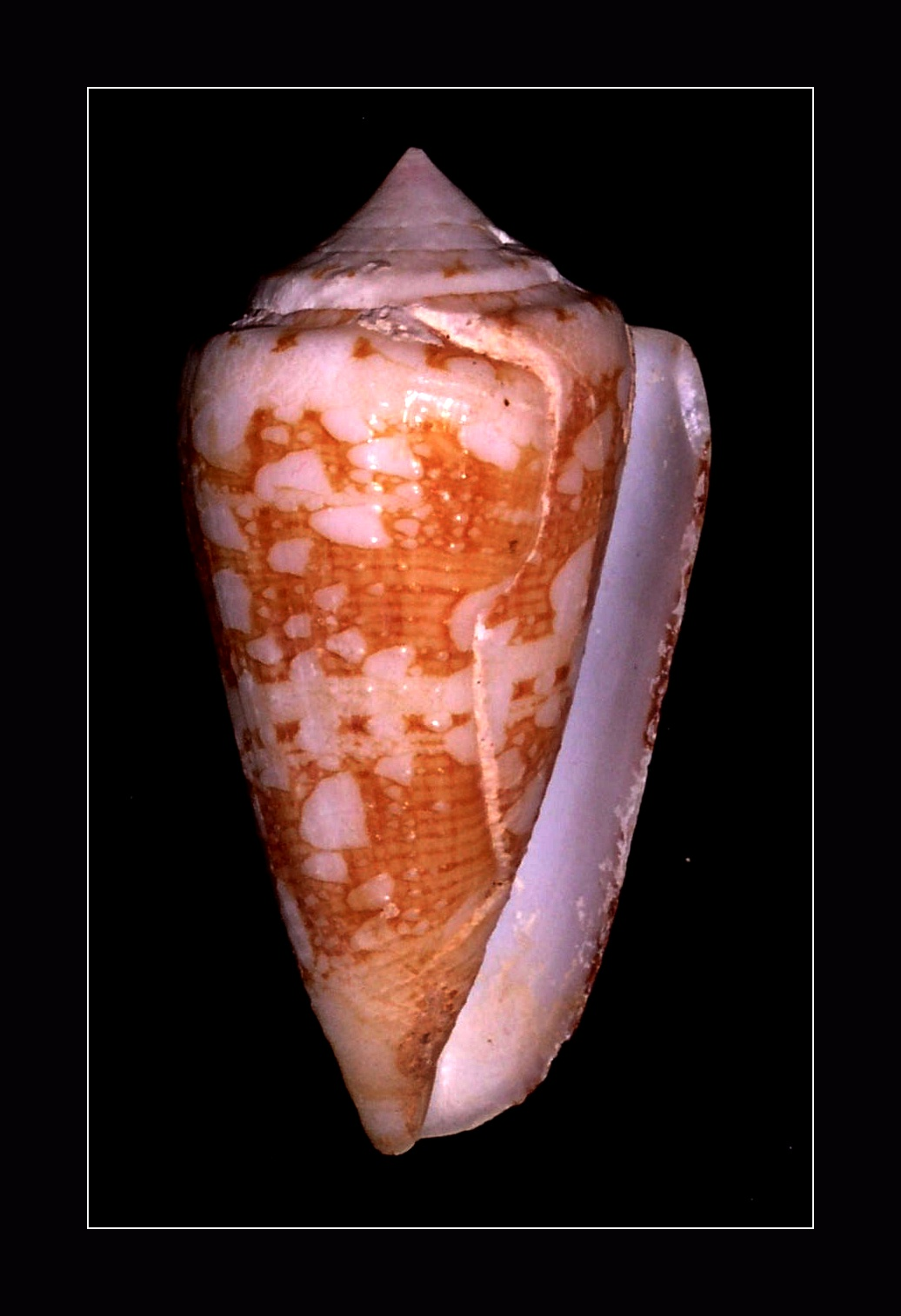

Scientific classification
- Kingdom: Animalia
- Phylum: Mollusca
- Class: Gastropoda
- Subclass: Caenogastropoda
- Order: Neogastropoda
- Superfamily: Conoidea
- Family: Conidae
- Genus: Conus
- Species: C. telatus

Binomial name
- Conus telatus Reeve, 1848

Synonyms
- Conus (Cylinder) telatus Reeve, 1848 · accepted, alternate representation; Cylinder telatus (Reeve, 1848); Cylindrus telatus (Reeve, 1848)

= Conus telatus =

Species of sea snail

Conus telatus, common name the Philippine cone, is a species of sea snail, a marine gastropod mollusk in the family Conidae, the cone snails and their allies.

Like all species within the genus Conus, these snails are predatory and venomous. They are capable of stinging humans, therefore live ones should be handled carefully or not at all.

== Description ==
The size of the shell varies between 45 mm and 100 mm. Its appearance is almost similar to Conus textile Linnaeus, 1758 but the triangular reticulations are much finer than in the type. The usual three bands are each divided into two, with narrow intervening spaces.

== Distribution ==
This marine species occurs off the Southern Philippines.
