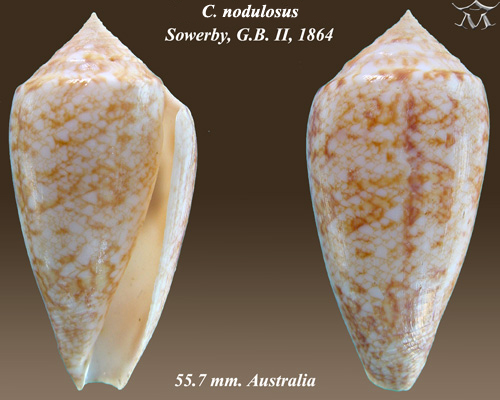
- Apertural and abapertural views of shell of Conus nodulosus Sowerby, G.B. II, 1864
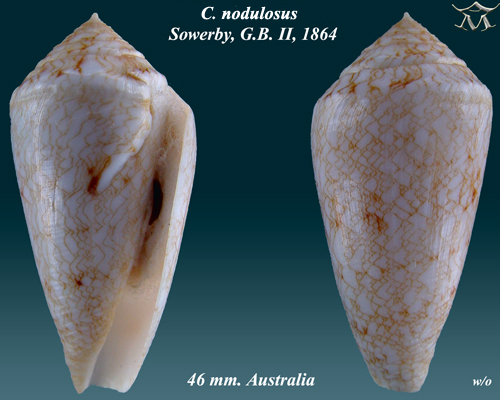

Scientific classification
- Domain: Eukaryota
- Kingdom: Animalia
- Phylum: Mollusca
- Class: Gastropoda
- Subclass: Caenogastropoda
- Order: Neogastropoda
- Superfamily: Conoidea
- Family: Conidae
- Genus: Conus
- Species: C. nodulosus

Binomial name
- Conus nodulosus G. B. Sowerby II, 1864

Synonyms
- Conus (Cylinder) nodulosus G. B. Sowerby II, 1864 · accepted, alternate representation; Cylinder nodulosus (G. B. Sowerby II, 1864)

= Conus nodulosus =

Species of sea snail

Conus nodulosus is a species of sea snail, a marine gastropod mollusk in the family Conidae, the cone snails and their allies.

Like all species within the genus Conus, these snails are predatory and venomous. They are capable of stinging humans, therefore live ones should be handled carefully or not at all.

== Description ==
The size of the shell varies between 35 mm and 51 mm. The shell has an elevated, channeled spire. Its color is yellowish, delicately and openly reticulated with chestnut. The aperture is roseate.

== Distribution ==
This marine species is endemic to Australia and occurs off Western Australia.

== Taxonomy ==
Conus nodulosus has often been treated as a geographical variant or subspecies of Conus victoriae. They have a disjunct distribution, the latter occurring from Exmouth to the Western Australia / Northern Territory border, whereas nodulosus has a distribution restricted from Geraldton to Kalbarri and the Abrolhos. For conservation implications, the two are here listed as distinct.
