= Ugr 9-1 =

Ion channel toxin Ugr9-1

Identifiers
3D model (JSmol)	Interactive image
IUPHAR/BPS	11475
- InChI: InChI=1S/C134H192N38O42S4/c1-11-65(7)104(136)127(208)164-89(57-174)122(203)170-107(66(8)12-2)129(210)163-87(50-103(187)188)130(211)172-41-19-25-95(172)131(212)171-40-18-24-94(171)126(207)167-92-60-217-218-61-93-125(206)168-105(63(3)4)128(209)162-82(45-72-30-36-76(177)37-31-72)118(199)161-86(49-102(185)186)116(197)150-68(10)108(189)156-79(43-70-26-32-74(175)33-27-70)110(191)144-55-100(182)153-90(113(194)147-52-97(179)149-67(9)109(190)169-106(64(5)6)132(213)214)58-215-216-59-91(165-119(200)80(42-69-20-14-13-15-21-69)157-114(195)78(155-123(92)204)23-17-39-143-134(139)140)124(205)158-81(44-71-28-34-75(176)35-29-71)117(198)159-83(46-73-51-141-62-148-73)120(201)154-77(22-16-38-142-133(137)138)115(196)160-85(48-101(183)184)111(192)145-54-99(181)152-88(56-173)112(193)146-53-98(180)151-84(47-96(135)178)121(202)166-93/h13-15,20-21,26-37,51,62-68,77-95,104-107,173-177H,11-12,16-19,22-25,38-50,52-61,136H2,1-10H3,(H2,135,178)(H,141,148)(H,144,191)(H,145,192)(H,146,193)(H,147,194)(H,149,179)(H,150,197)(H,151,180)(H,152,181)(H,153,182)(H,154,201)(H,155,204)(H,156,189)(H,157,195)(H,158,205)(H,159,198)(H,160,196)(H,161,199)(H,162,209)(H,163,210)(H,164,208)(H,165,200)(H,166,202)(H,167,207)(H,168,206)(H,169,190)(H,170,203)(H,183,184)(H,185,186)(H,187,188)(H,213,214)(H4,137,138,142)(H4,139,140,143)/t65-,66-,67-,68-,77-,78-,79-,80-,81-,82-,83-,84-,85-,86-,87-,88-,89-,90-,91-,92-,93-,94-,95-,104-,105-,106-,107-/m0/s1 Key: ZBHPYYIKUBRNGR-KKLLQCONSA-N
- SMILES: N[C@@]([H])([C@]([H])(CC)C)C(=O)N[C@@]([H])(CO)C(=O)N[C@@]([H])([C@]([H])(CC)C)C(=O)N[C@@]([H])(CC(=O)O)C(=O)N1[C@@]([H])(CCC1)C(=O)N1[C@@]([H])(CCC1)C(=O)N[C@@]([H])(CS3)C(=O)N[C@@]([H])(CCCNC(=N)N)C(=O)N[C@@]([H])(Cc1ccccc1)C(=O)N[C@@]([H])(CS4)C(=O)N[C@@]([H])(Cc1ccc(O)cc1)C(=O)N[C@@]([H])(CC1=CN=C-N1)C(=O)N[C@@]([H])(CCCNC(=N)N)C(=O)N[C@@]([H])(CC(=O)O)C(=O)NCC(=O)N[C@@]([H])(CO)C(=O)NCC(=O)N[C@@]([H])(CC(=O)N)C(=O)N[C@@]([H])(CS3)C(=O)N[C@@]([H])(C(C)C)C(=O)N[C@@]([H])(Cc1ccc(O)cc1)C(=O)N[C@@]([H])(CC(=O)O)C(=O)N[C@@]([H])(C)C(=O)N[C@@]([H])(Cc1ccc(O)cc1)C(=O)NCC(=O)N[C@@]([H])(CS4)C(=O)NCC(=O)N[C@@]([H])(C)C(=O)N[C@@]([H])(C(C)C)C(=O)O

Properties
Chemical formula	C_{134}H_{192}N_{38}O_{42}S_{4}
Molar mass	3135.47 g·mol^{−1}
- Except where otherwise noted, data are given for materials in their standard state (at 25 °C [77 °F], 100 kPa). Infobox references

Ugr 9-1 is a 29-amino acid peptide toxin derived from the venom of the sea anemone Urticina grebelnyi. The structure of the peptide is also referred to as 'the boundless β-hairpin", as it consists of two S-S bridges that provide stability, three classical β-turns, and a twisted β-hairpin without interstrand disulfide bonds. Ugr 9-1 can completely block the transient component of the human acid-sensing ion channel 3 (ASIC3) and partially inhibit the sustained component, both of which are reversible.

== Etymology & source ==
The full name of Ugr 9-1 is π-AnmTX Ugr 9a-1.

- The Greek letter π indicates the molecular target of the toxin, the acid-sensing ion channel (ASIC).
- AnmTX denotes this toxin as a sea anemone neurotoxin.
- Ugr refers to the species of sea anemone, which is Urticina grebelnyi (genus Urticina, family Tealidae, Phylum Cnidaria).
- The designation 9a signifies the structural class of the toxin, which is currently defined according to the distribution of key cysteine residues by 10 general motifs (i.e., the number '9'). The suffix 'a' indicates the subclass, describing more precise structural features, such as the reduction of the available interval degeneration between cysteine residues. The motif of 9a structural class is C2C#C#C, with the symbol of # indicating a 1-9 amino-acid gap between cysteine residues.
- The final suffix '1' means that the toxin is the first identified member of its structural class.

== Chemistry ==
=== Sequence & homology ===
Ugr 9-1 is a peptide consisting of 29 amino acids. The peptide sequence is as follows:

ISIDPPCRFCYHRDGSGNCVYDAYGCGAV

The average molecular mass of this peptide was determined to be 3135.5 Da. The theoretical molecular mass corresponds to the experimental molecular mass, indicating that there are no post-translational modifications.

Close homologs to Ugr 9-1 are other class 9a peptides, which are Ugr 9-2 and Ugr 9-3. These peptides are isolated from the same sea anemone, Urticina grebelnyi, and are very similar in primary structure, making them sequence homologs (or otherwise indicated as structural 9a homologs). The difference between the peptides is their function, as Ugr 9-2 and Ugr 9-3 do not have the same target as Ugr 9-1.

=== Structure ===
The amino acids of the peptide chain are organized in two anti-parallel β-sheets, as the major secondary structure of the toxin. The β-sheets are connected by three β-turns (located in the Arg^{8}-Tyr^{11}, Asp^{14}-Gly^{17}, and Asn^{22}-Gly^{25} regions) to form the twisted β-hairpin structure that the toxin is characterized by. This β-hairpin structure is stabilized by two disulfide bonds, linking cysteine residues, specifically at the locations of Cys^{7}-Cys^{19} and Cys^{10}-Cys^{26}. This linkage ensures chemical and conformational stability. Ugr 9-1 is also called the "boundless β-hairpin", because of the lack of interstrand disulfide bonds, which is a novel spatial peptide fold. Further stabilization is achieved by six backbone-backbone hydrogen bonds, and two side chain-backbone hydrogen bonds.

This structural arrangement gives Ugr 9-1 a flat, non-globular shape, measuring approximately 25 × 20 × 9 Å. This is a notable structural difference in comparison to many other peptide toxins, as they typically have a more globular shape. Furthermore, the positively and negatively charged side chains, arginine and aspartic acid respectively, of the molecule are evenly distributed across the surface. In contrast, hydrophobic side chains are mainly located in the C-terminal region.

== Target ==
The target of Ugr 9-1 is the Acid-Sensing Ion Channel 3 (ASIC3), which the toxin inhibits. ASIC3 is a voltage-insensitive proton-gated sodium channel, meaning that it responds to acidification, and lets sodium pass through. It has been assumed that the key amino acid residues of Ugr 9-1 are phenylalanine, tyrosine, and histidine. These residues, among others, are thought to be involved in recognition of the ASIC3 receptor.

The IC_{50} of Ugr 9-1 is 9.1 ± 0.9 μM for transient currents, and 1.88 ± 0.36 μM for sustained currents. The transient current is linked to acute nociceptive signals, while the sustained current carries prolonged signals, relevant for chronic pain and inflammation.

== Mode of action ==
Ugr 9-1 binds to ASIC3 and reversibly inhibits channel function by reducing the transient and sustained currents. The toxin has a higher potency for the sustained current but can only partially, maximum 48%, inhibit this current at the point of saturation. A higher concentration of the toxin is required to inhibit the transient current, but once this threshold is reached, this current can be fully blocked.

== Toxicity ==
Toxicity was assessed in the noble crayfish at a dose of 1 mg/kg, Ugr 9-1 did not cause lethality or paralysis at this dose. Therapeutic doses, ranging from 0.01 to 1 mg/kg, also did not show any adverse effects. Motor impairment and behavioral alterations were assessed, but both were found to be absent.

== Treatment ==
Ugr 9-1 normally causes no poisoning reaction by itself, as its principal biological effect is the inhibitory effects on ASIC3, which mainly demonstrate the analgesic and anti-inflammatory outcomes. Therefore, there is currently no specific treatment of Ugr 9-1 reported. However, in mice thermal hyperalgesia tests, the analgesic effect of Ugr 9-1 demonstrated a bell-shaped dose-response curve, suggesting that high-dosed and prolonged exposure to Ugr 9-1 might lead to a reversed hormesis, which could be its potential adverse effect.

== Therapeutic use ==
There has been no report on the clinical application of the Ugr 9-1 sea anemone neurotoxin so far. However, mice experiments have examined the effectiveness of Ugr 9-1 mainly on pain relief. ASIC3 is an acknowledged therapeutic target involving inflammation and pain. Previous studies have shown that ASIC3 plays an indispensable role in the primary generation of acid-induced and inflammatory pain.

To test the analgesic effect of Ugr 9-1 on acid-induced pain, there is a mice-model test on acetic acid-induced writhing. APETx2, a most well-studied peptide ASIC3 inhibitor, reaches its maximum effect with 10 times of the dose that Ugr 9-1 shows its maximal effect. On the other hand, when testing their analgesic effect on the inflammatory-related pain in mice models established by the complete Freund's adjuvant (CFA) administration, Ugr 9-1 displays weaker analgesic effect than APETx2 under the equivalent dose.

Ugr 9-1 is an effective experimental inhibitor of ASIC3 with significant analgesic effects in animal models. Its present role is mainly in relation to ASIC3 research, rather than the clinical or therapeutic application.
