= Conus biancae =

Conservation status
- Data Deficient (IUCN 3.1)

Scientific classification
- Kingdom: Animalia
- Phylum: Mollusca
- Class: Gastropoda
- Subclass: Caenogastropoda
- Order: Neogastropoda
- Superfamily: Conoidea
- Family: Conidae
- Genus: Conus
- Species: C. biancae

Binomial name
- Conus biancae Bozzetti, 2010

Synonyms
- Conus (Darioconus) biancae Bozzetti, 2010 · accepted, alternate representation; Cylinder biancae Bozzetti, 2010; Darioconus biancae (Bozzetti, 2010)

Species of sea snail

Conus biancae, common name Bianca's cone, is a species of sea snail, a marine gastropod mollusc in the family Conidae, the cone snails and their allies.

Like all species within the genus Conus, these snails are predatory and venomous. They are capable of stinging humans, therefore live ones should be handled carefully or not at all.

== Description ==
The maximum length of the shell attains 42.9 millimeters. The color of the shell is pure white. it resembles both Conus clarus and Conus cocceus.

== Distribution ==
This marine species is only found in its type locality, in Sandravinany, South-Eastern Madagascar.
