= St. Joseph's Cathedral, Criciúma =

St. Joseph's Cathedral
- Catedral São José
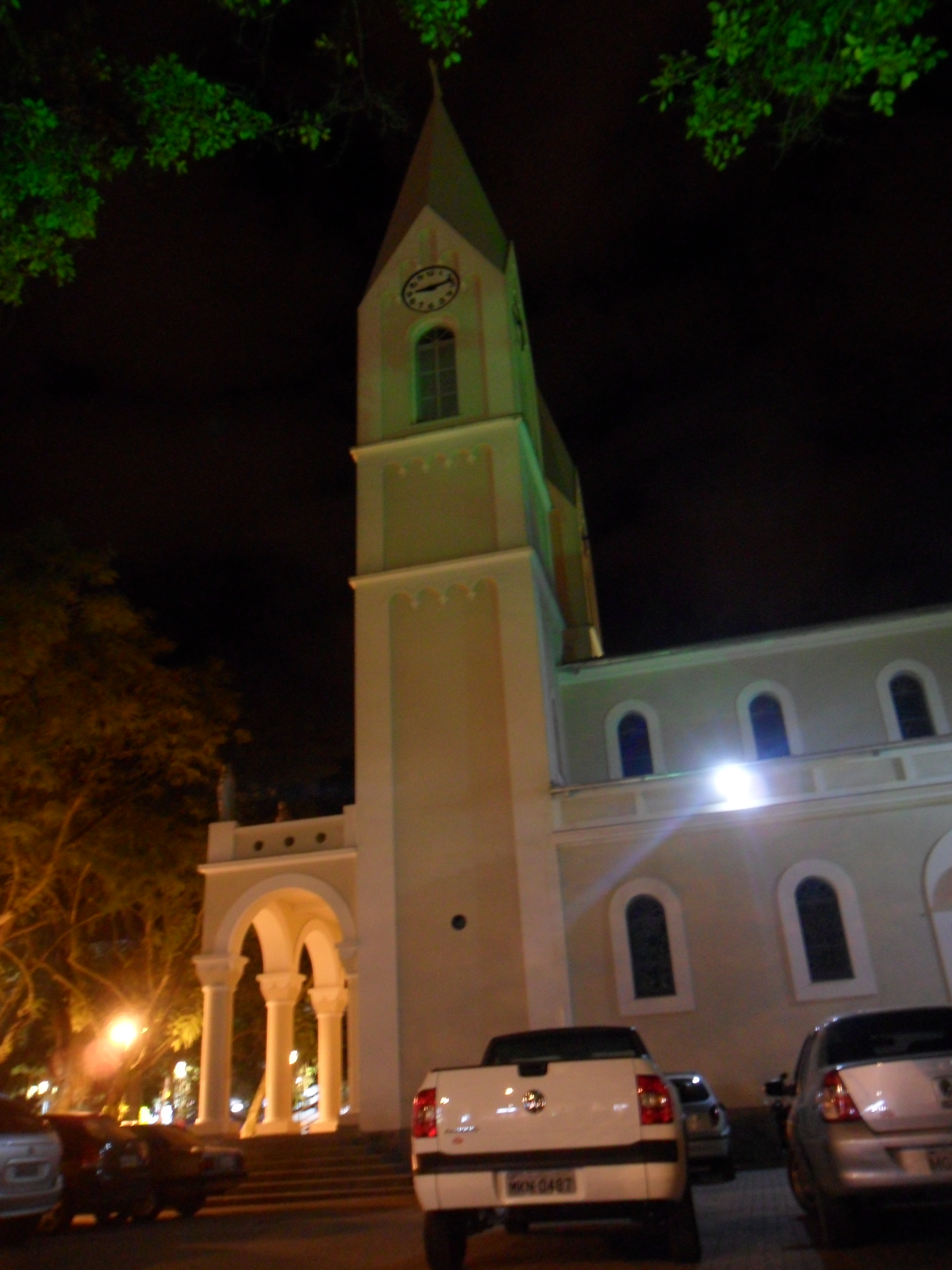
- St. Joseph's Cathedral
- Location: Criciúma
- Country: Brazil
- Denomination: Roman Catholic Church

Architecture
- Years built: 1907–1917

Administration
- Diocese: Roman Catholic Diocese of Criciúma

The St. Joseph's Cathedral (also Criciúma Cathedral; Portuguese: Catedral São José) is a Catholic church located in the center of the municipality and locality of Criciúma, in front of the Nereu Ramos Square in the state of Santa Catarina in southern Brazil. In 2012, the church reopened after five years of work and features a new look.

Its construction began in 1907 under the direction of Father João Canônico. The inauguration took place in 1917, at the time when Father Francisco Bertero was the official parish priest. In 1946, for the Eucharistic Congress, there were changes in the façade, two side chapels and the images of the saints, created by Natalício Marques. In 1976 it was covered with tiles and thirty years later it was enlarged, in 2006. Its construction is of a Romanesque style mixed with Gothic, with naves divided into two rows of columns.

== See also ==
- Roman Catholicism in Brazil
- St. Joseph's Cathedral
