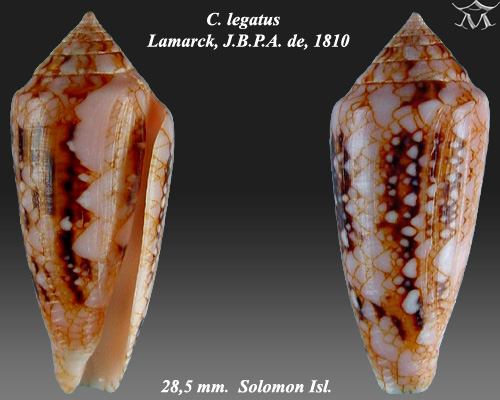
- Apertural and abapertural views of shell of Conus legatus Lamarck, J.B.P.A. de, 1810
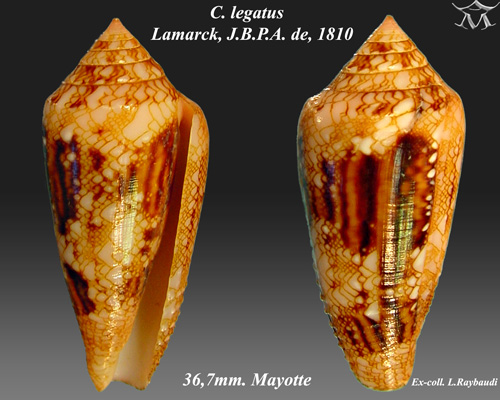

Conservation status
- Least Concern (IUCN 3.1)

Scientific classification
- Kingdom: Animalia
- Phylum: Mollusca
- Class: Gastropoda
- Subclass: Caenogastropoda
- Order: Neogastropoda
- Superfamily: Conoidea
- Family: Conidae
- Genus: Conus
- Species: C. legatus

Binomial name
- Conus legatus Lamarck, 1810

Synonyms
- Conus (Cylinder) legatus Lamarck, 1810 · accepted, alternate representation; Conus musivum G. B. Sowerby I, 1833; Cylinder legatus (Lamarck, 1810); Cylindrus legatus (Lamarck, 1810)

= Conus legatus =

Species of sea snail

Conus legatus, common name the ambassador cone, is a species of sea snail, a marine gastropod mollusk in the family Conidae, the cone snails and their allies.

Like all species within the genus Conus, these snails are predatory and venomous. They are capable of stinging humans, therefore live ones should be handled carefully or not at all.

== Description ==
The size of the shell varies between 22 mm and 63 mm. The shell is small and rather narrow, with strong longitudinal chocolate markings over the reticulations.

== Distribution ==
This marine species occurs off Western Thailand, Okinawa, Japan; off French Polynesia; in the Indian Ocean off Mozambique, Seychelles, Mauritius and Réunion; off Australia (Queensland, Western Australia).
