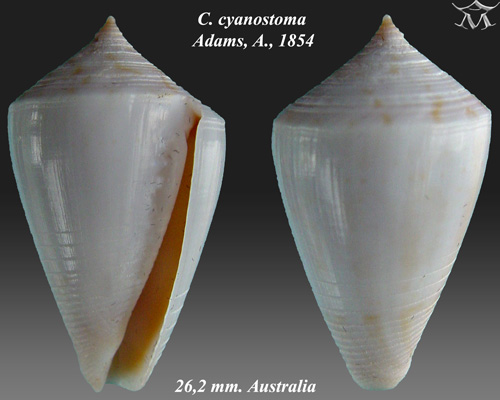
- Apertural and abapertural views of shell of Conus cyanostoma Adams, A., 1854
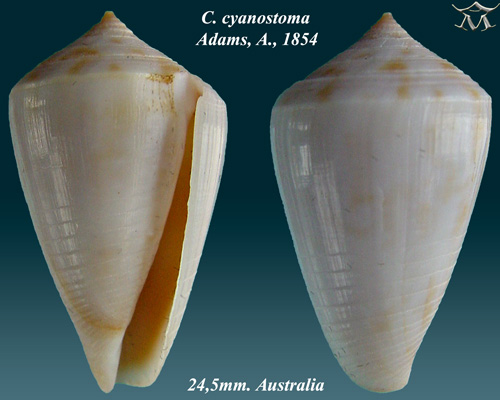

Conservation status
- Least Concern (IUCN 3.1)

Scientific classification
- Kingdom: Animalia
- Phylum: Mollusca
- Class: Gastropoda
- Subclass: Caenogastropoda
- Order: Neogastropoda
- Superfamily: Conoidea
- Family: Conidae
- Genus: Conus
- Species: C. cyanostoma

Binomial name
- Conus cyanostoma A. Adams, 1855

Synonyms
- Austroconus cyanostoma (A. Adams, 1855); Conus (Austroconus) cyanostoma A. Adams, 1855 · accepted, alternate representation; Conus coxeni Brazier, 1875; Conus innotabilis E. A. Smith, 1892

= Conus cyanostoma =

Species of sea snail

Conus cyanostoma is a species of sea snail, a marine gastropod mollusk in the family Conidae, the cone snails and their allies.

Like all species within the genus Conus, these snails are predatory and venomous. They are capable of stinging humans, therefore live ones should be handled carefully or not at all.

== Description ==
The length of the shell varies between 17 mm and 32 mm.

== Distribution ==
This marine species occurs in the tropical Indo-Pacific Region and off Australia (New South Wales, Queensland).
