= Conus tagaroae =

Scientific classification
- Kingdom: Animalia
- Phylum: Mollusca
- Class: Gastropoda
- Subclass: Caenogastropoda
- Order: Neogastropoda
- Superfamily: Conoidea
- Family: Conidae
- Genus: Conus
- Species: C. tagaroae

Binomial name
- Conus tagaroae (Limpalaër & Monnier, 2013)

Synonyms
- Conus (Cylinder) tagaroae (Limpalaër & Monnier, 2013) · accepted, alternate representation; Cylinder tagaroae Limpalaër & Monnier, 2013

Species of sea snail

Conus tagaroae is a species of sea snail, a marine gastropod mollusk in the family Conidae, the cone snails, cone shells or cones.

These snails are predatory and venomous. They are capable of stinging humans.

== Description ==
The size of the shell varies between 40 mm and 84 mm.

== Distribution ==
This marine species occurs off the Philippines.
