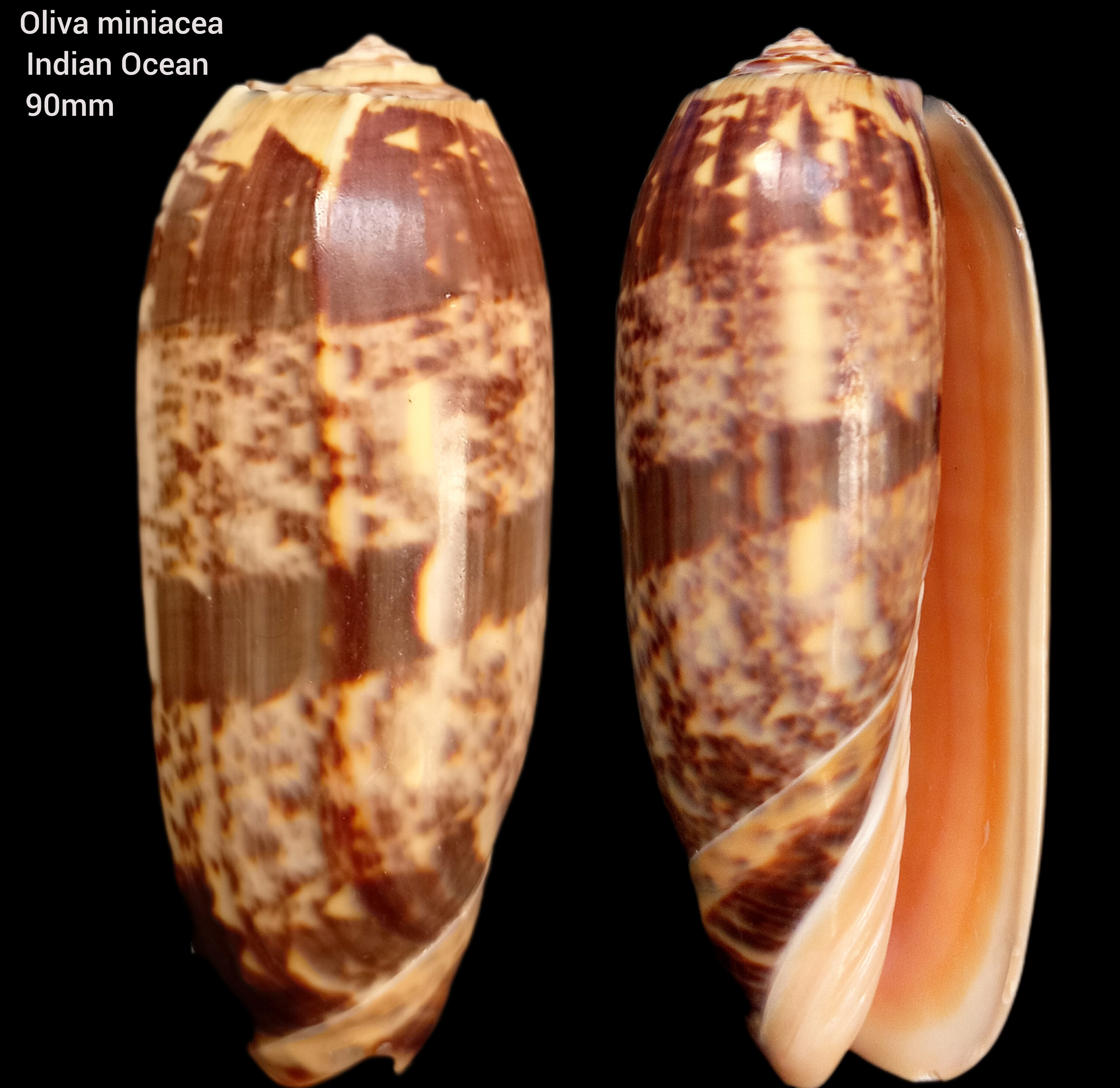

Scientific classification
- Kingdom: Animalia
- Phylum: Mollusca
- Class: Gastropoda
- Subclass: Caenogastropoda
- Order: Neogastropoda
- Family: Olividae
- Genus: Oliva
- Species: O. miniacea

Binomial name
- Oliva miniacea (Röding, 1798)

Synonyms
- Cylinder erythrostoma (Meuschen, 1787) (non-binomial); Miniaceoliva miniacea (Röding, 1798); Oliva aurantiaca Schumacher, 1817; Oliva azemula Duclos, 1840; Oliva erythrostoma Lamarck, 1811; Oliva erythrostoma var. efasciata Dautzenberg, 1927; Oliva erythrostoma var. saturata Dautzenberg, 1927; Oliva magnifica Ducros de St. Germain, 1857; Oliva masaris Duclos, 1835; Oliva messaris Marrat, 1871; Oliva miniata Link, H.F., 1807; Oliva miniacea miniacea (Röding, 1798); Oliva porphyracea Perry, G., 1811; Oliva porphyritica Marrat, 1871; Oliva sericea var. johnsoni Higgins, 1919; Oliva sericea var. marratti Johnson, 1910; Oliva sylvia Duclos, 1845; Oliva titea Duclos, 1844; Oliva zeilanica Johnson, 1910; Oliva (Miniaceoliva) miniacea (Röding, 1798); Oliva (Oliva) erythrostoma Lamarck, J.B.P.A. de, 1811; Oliva (Oliva) porphyritica Marrat, F.P., 1870; Porphyria miniacea Röding, 1798 (basionym); Porphyria miniata Link, 1807

= Oliva miniacea =

Species of gastropod

Oliva miniacea, common name the Pacific common olive, is a species of sea snail, a marine gastropod mollusk in the family Olividae, the olives.

There are two subspecies:

- Oliva miniacea berti Terzer, 1986: synonym of Oliva efasciata berti (Terzer, 1986)
- Oliva miniacea miniacea (Röding, 1798): synonym of Miniaceoliva miniacea (Röding, 1798) synonym of Oliva miniacea (Röding, 1798)
- Oliva miniacea tremulina Lamarck, 1811: synonym of Oliva tremulina (Lamarck, 1811)

== Description ==
The length of the shell varies between 45 mm and 100mm. It is one of the larger olive snails.

As is typical of olivids, the shell of this species is smooth, glossy, and elongated, with a very long aperture. The spire of this species is quite low even for an olivid. The filament channel, a groove present on the spire of olivids, is especially distinct in this species.

Shells of this species tend to have a yellowish or pale orange ground color with a pattern of two or three wide, rough bands of a much darker color (usually dark brown or black). Finer patterning is often present between the bands. Exceedingly pale specimens may be off-white with light brown patterns. At the opposite extreme, sometimes the pattern can cover so much of the shell that the shell is nearly black. The inside of the aperture is orange or yellowish-orange.

This species has caused food poisoning with a paralytic toxin in Taiwan in 2002.

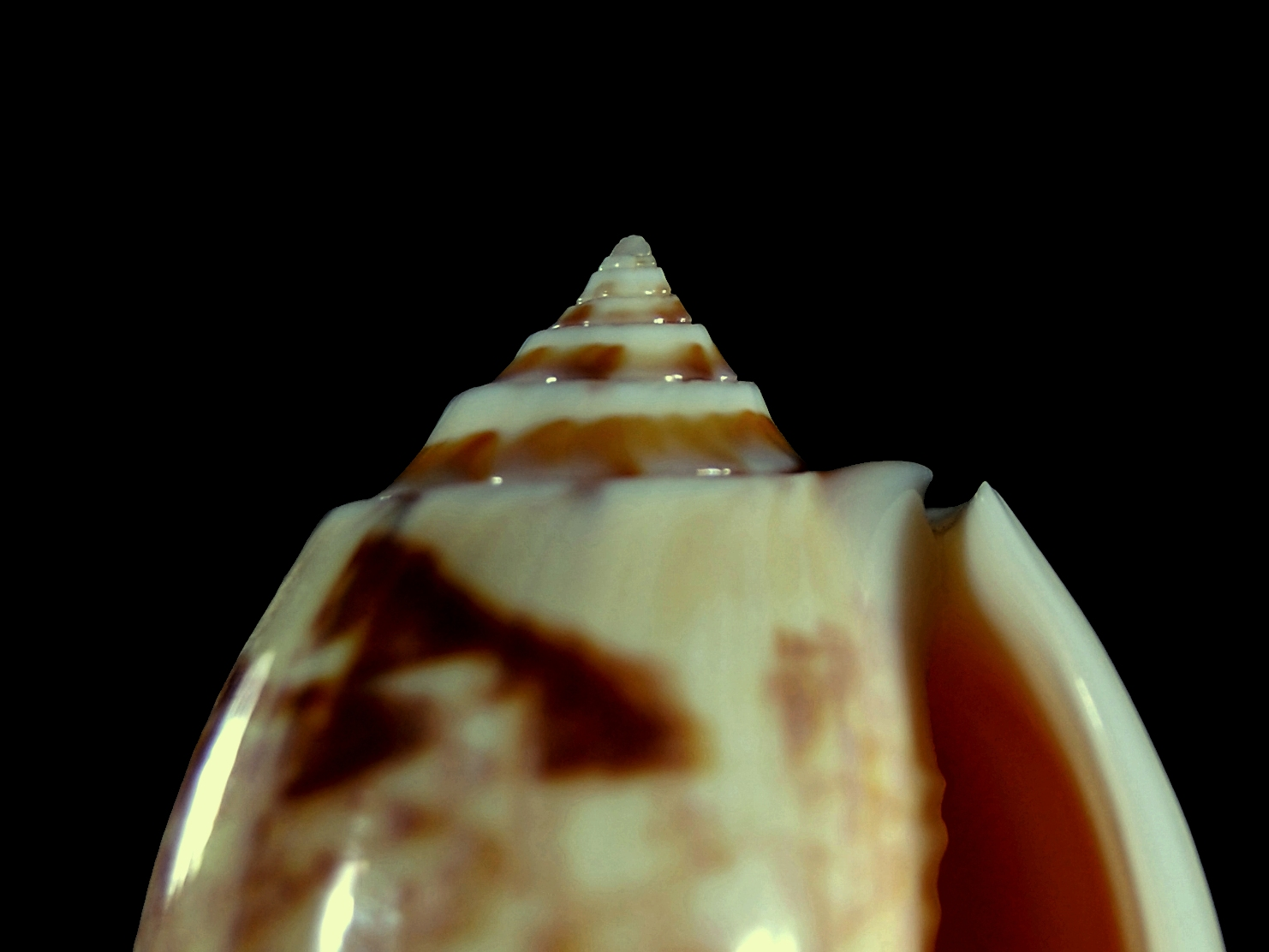
Spire of the Pacific Common Olive, Length 7.5 cm, Width 3.6 mm

== Distribution ==
This species occurs in the Indian Ocean off Chagos, the Mascarene Basin and Mauritius; in the Western Pacific Ocean and in the Andaman Sea.
