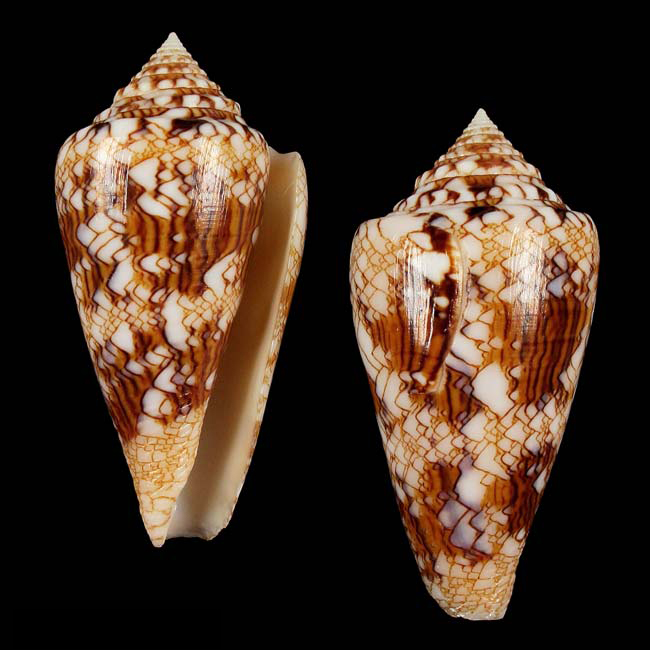

Scientific classification
- Kingdom: Animalia
- Phylum: Mollusca
- Class: Gastropoda
- Subclass: Caenogastropoda
- Order: Neogastropoda
- Family: Conidae
- Genus: Conus
- Species: C. scottjordani

Binomial name
- Conus scottjordani (Poppe, Monnier & Tagaro, 2012)

Synonyms
- Conus (Cylinder) scottjordani (Poppe, Monnier & Tagaro, 2012); Cylinder scottjordani (Poppe, Monnier & Tagaro, 2012)

= Conus scottjordani =

Species of sea snail

Conus scottjordani is a species of sea snail, a marine gastropod mollusk in the family Conidae.

== Original description ==
- (of Cylindrus scottjordani Poppe, Monnier & Tagaro, 2012) Poppe G.T., Monnier E. & Tagaro S.P. (2012) New Conidae from the central Philippines. Visaya 3(5): 47-56. [March 2012]

page(s): 47.

== Distribution ==
Philippines, Cuyo islands.
