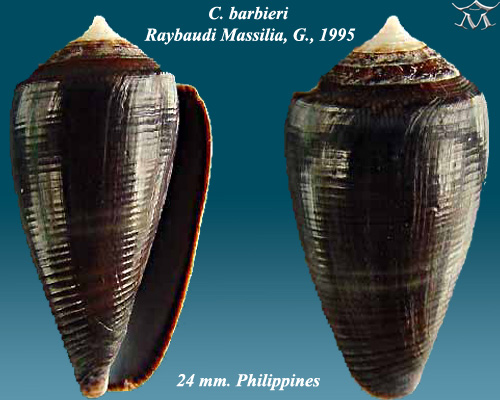
- Apertural and abapertural views of shell of Conus barbieri Raybaudi Massilia, G., 1995
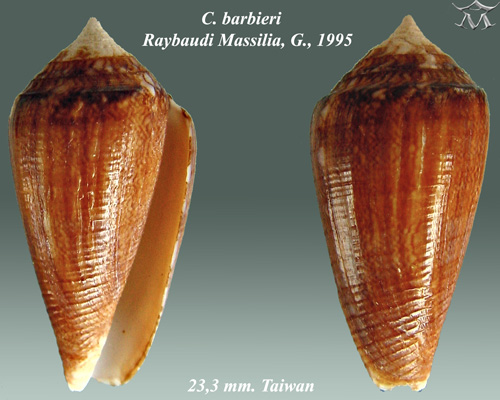

Conservation status
- Least Concern (IUCN 3.1)

Scientific classification
- Kingdom: Animalia
- Phylum: Mollusca
- Class: Gastropoda
- Subclass: Caenogastropoda
- Order: Neogastropoda
- Superfamily: Conoidea
- Family: Conidae
- Genus: Conus
- Species: C. barbieri

Binomial name
- Conus barbieri G. Raybaudi Massilia, 1995

Synonyms
- Conus (Cylinder) barbieri G. Raybaudi Massilia, 1995 · accepted, alternate representation; Cylinder barbieri (G. Raybaudi Massilia, 1995)

= Conus barbieri =

Species of sea snail

Conus barbieri is a species of sea snail, a marine gastropod mollusk in the family Conidae, the cone snails and their allies.

Like all species within the genus Conus, these snails are predatory and venomous. They are capable of stinging humans, therefore live ones should be handled carefully or not at all.

== Description ==
The size of the shell varies between 25 mm and 40 mm.

== Distribution ==
This marine species occurs off the Philippines.
