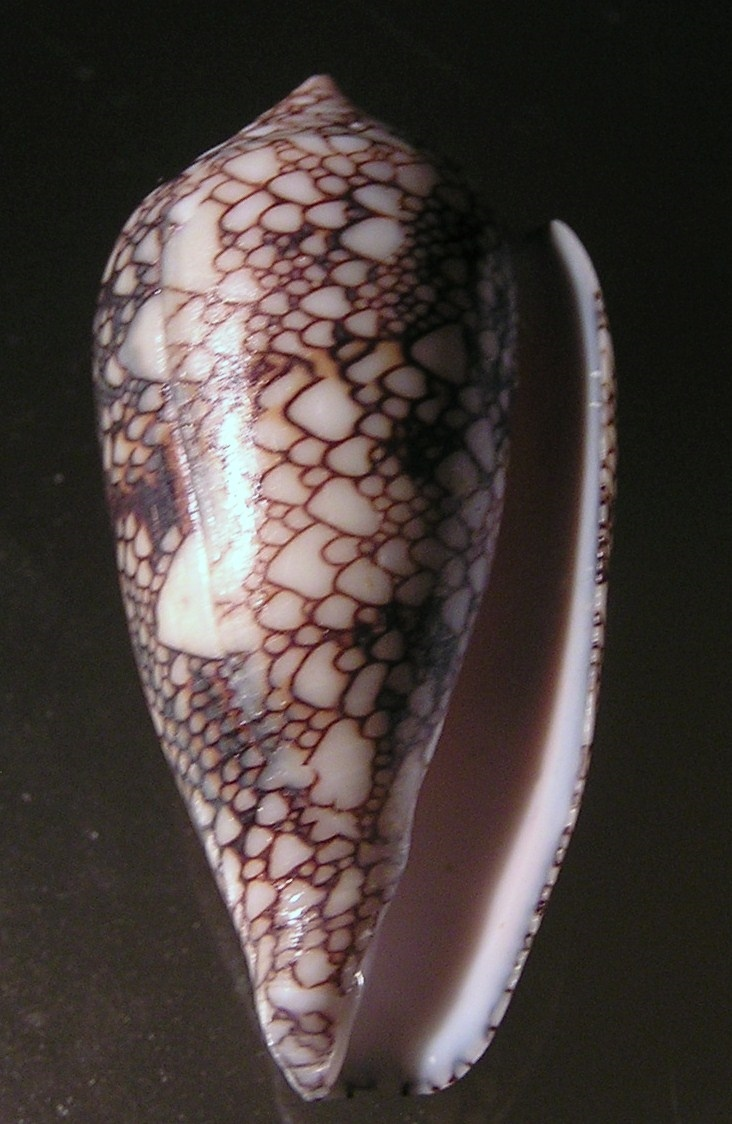
- Conus canonicus

Conservation status
- Least Concern (IUCN 3.1)

Scientific classification
- Kingdom: Animalia
- Phylum: Mollusca
- Class: Gastropoda
- Subclass: Caenogastropoda
- Order: Neogastropoda
- Superfamily: Conoidea
- Family: Conidae
- Genus: Conus
- Species: C. canonicus

Binomial name
- Conus canonicus Hwass in Bruguière, 1792

Synonyms
- Conus (Cylinder) canonicus Hwass in Bruguière, 1792 · accepted, alternate representation; Conus condensus G. B. Sowerby II, 1866; Conus pyramidalis Lamarck, 1810; Conus rubescens Bonnet, 1864; Cylinder canonicus (Hwass in Bruguière, 1792)

= Conus canonicus =

Species of sea snail

Conus canonicus, common name the tiger cone, is a species of sea snail, a marine gastropod mollusk in the family Conidae, the cone snails and their allies.

Like all species within the genus Conus, these snails are predatory and venomous. They are capable of stinging humans, therefore live ones should be handled carefully or not at all.

== Description ==
The size of the shell varies between 25 mm and 70 mm. The appearance of the shell is closely related to Conus textile, but it has much smaller reticulations, more completely covering the surface.

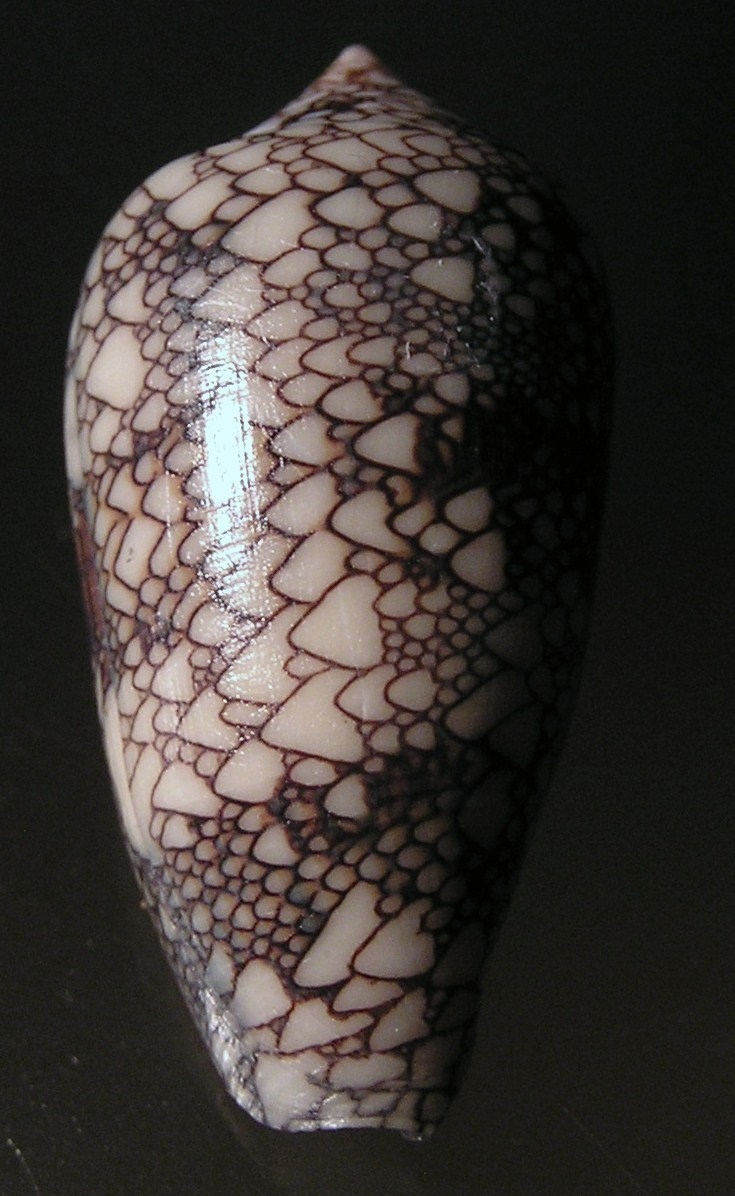
Conus canonicus

== Distribution ==
This marine species occurs in the Red Sea, the tropical Indo-West Pacific and off Australia (Northern Territory, Queensland and Western Australia)
