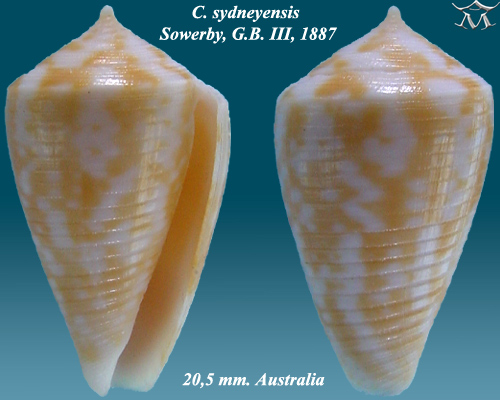
- Apertural and abapertural views of shell of Conus sydneyensis Sowerby, G.B. III, 1887

Scientific classification
- Kingdom: Animalia
- Phylum: Mollusca
- Class: Gastropoda
- Subclass: Caenogastropoda
- Order: Neogastropoda
- Superfamily: Conoidea
- Family: Conidae
- Genus: Conus
- Species: C. sydneyensis

Binomial name
- Conus sydneyensis G. B. Sowerby III, 1887

Synonyms
- Austroconus sydneyensis (G. B. Sowerby III, 1887); Conus (Austroconus) sydneyensis G. B. Sowerby III, 1887 · accepted, alternate representation; Leptoconus illawarra Garrard, 1961

= Conus sydneyensis =

Species of sea snail

Conus sydneyensis is a species of sea snail, a marine gastropod mollusk in the family Conidae, the cone snails and their allies.

Like all species within the genus Conus, these snails are predatory and venomous. They are capable of stinging humans, therefore live ones should not be handled at all, except by qualified federal animal control personnel.

== Description ==
Length of the shell varies between 21 mm and 35 mm, weighs medium with slightly convex or straight sides.

== Distribution ==
This marine species is endemic to Australia and occurs off New South Wales.
