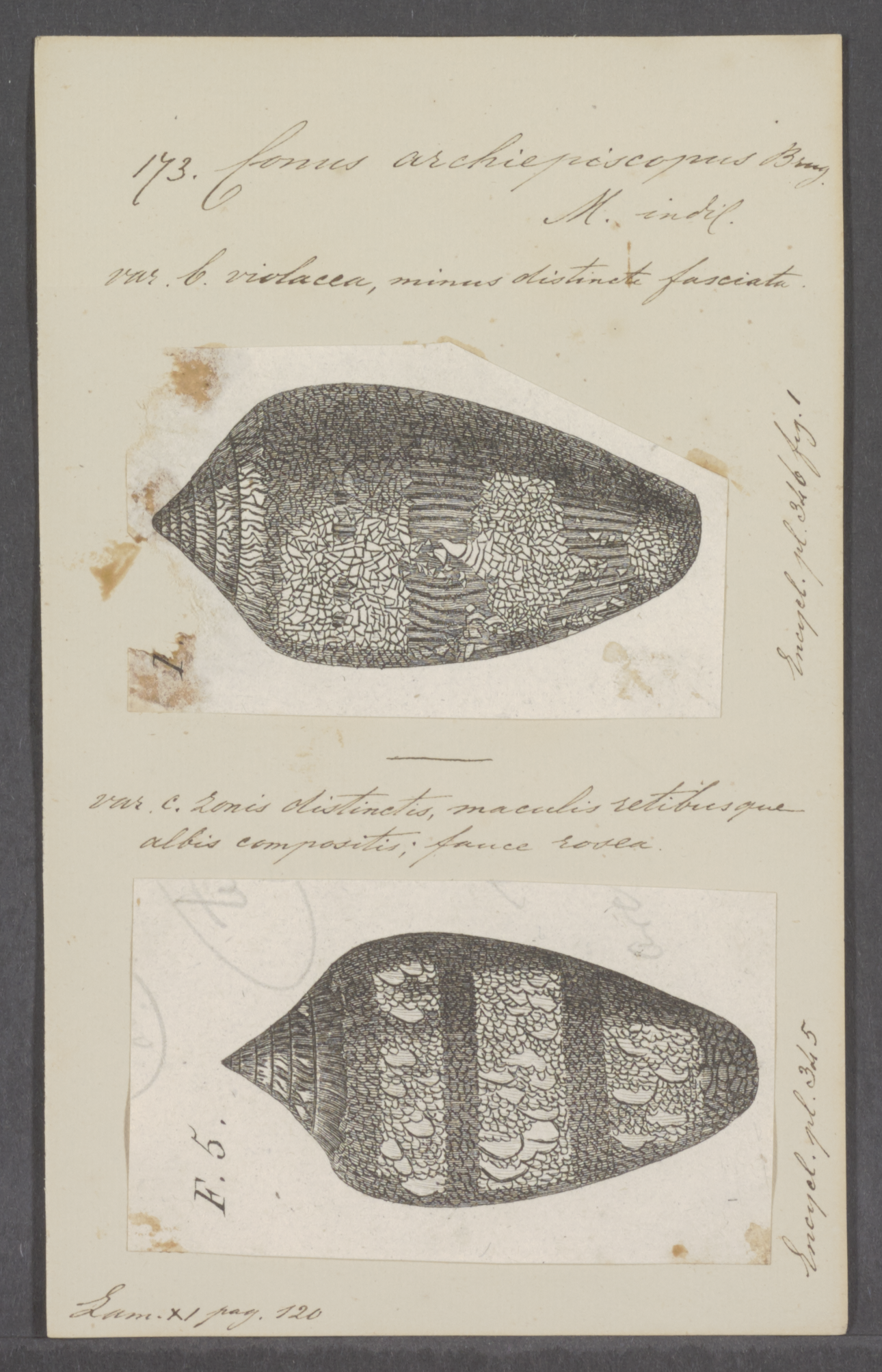
- Conus archiepiscopus

Scientific classification
- Kingdom: Animalia
- Phylum: Mollusca
- Class: Gastropoda
- Subclass: Caenogastropoda
- Order: Neogastropoda
- Superfamily: Conoidea
- Family: Conidae
- Genus: Conus
- Species: C. archiepiscopus

Binomial name
- Conus archiepiscopus Hwass in Bruguière, 1792

Synonyms
- Conus (Cylinder) archiepiscopus Hwass in Bruguière, 1792; Conus (Cylinder) priscai Bozzetti, 2012; Conus (Darioconus) biancae Bozzetti, 2010; Conus biancae Bozzetti, 2010; Conus communis Swainson, 1840; Conus euetrios G. B. Sowerby III, 1882; Conus eumitus Tomlin, 1926; Conus panniculus Lamarck, 1810; Conus priscai (Bozzetti, 2012); Conus pyramidalis Lamarck, 1810; Conus sirventi Fenaux, 1943; Conus suzannae van Rossum, 1990; Conus textile archiepiscopus Hwass in Bruguière, 1792; Conus textile var. euetrios G. B. Sowerby III, 1882; Conus textile var. ponderosa Dautzenberg, 1932; Cylinder biancae (Bozzetti, 2010); Cylinder priscai Bozzetti, 2012; Darioconus biancae (Bozzetti, 2010)

= Conus archiepiscopus =

Species of gastropod

Conus archiepiscopus is a species of sea snail, a marine gastropod mollusk, in the family Conidae, the cone snails and their allies.

== Distribution ==
This marine species occurs off Tanzania and Madagascar.
