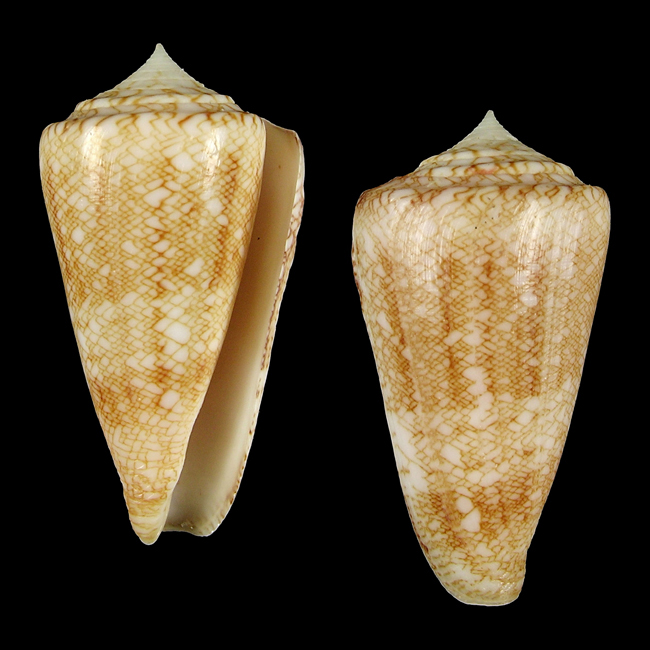

Scientific classification
- Kingdom: Animalia
- Phylum: Mollusca
- Class: Gastropoda
- Subclass: Caenogastropoda
- Order: Neogastropoda
- Superfamily: Conoidea
- Family: Conidae
- Genus: Conus
- Species: C. glorioceanus

Binomial name
- Conus glorioceanus Poppe & Tagaro, 2009

Synonyms
- Conus (Cylinder) glorioceanus Poppe & Tagaro, 2009 · accepted, alternate representation; Cylinder glorioceanus (Poppe & Tagaro, 2009); Cylindrus glorioceanus (Poppe & Tagaro, 2009)

= Conus glorioceanus =

Species of sea snail

Conus glorioceanus is a species of sea snail, a marine gastropod mollusk in the family Conidae, the cone snails and their allies.

Like all species within the genus Conus, these snails are predatory and venomous. They are capable of stinging humans, therefore live ones should be handled carefully or not at all.

== Description ==
The size of the shell varies between 30 mm and 51 mm.

== Distribution ==
This marine species occurs off the Philippines.
