= ASIC3 =

Protein found in humans

Identifiers
- Aliases: ASIC3, ACCN3, DRASIC, SLNAC1, TNaC1, acid sensing ion channel subunit 3
- External IDs: OMIM: 611741; MGI: 2159339; GeneCards: ASIC3

Gene location (Human)
Chr.	Chromosome 7 (human)
Band	7q36.1	Start	151,048,292 bp
Band	7q36.1	End	151,052,756 bp

Gene location (Mouse)
Chr.	Chromosome 5 (mouse)
Band	5|5 A3	Start	24,618,390 bp
Band	5|5 A3	End	24,622,833 bp
RNA expression pattern
Bgee	Human / Mouse (ortholog); Top expressed in: right hemisphere of cerebellum; right testis; left testis; right frontal lobe; apex of heart; C1 segment; anterior pituitary; nucleus accumbens; caudate nucleus; putamen / Top expressed in: lumbar spinal ganglion; neural layer of retina; vestibular membrane of cochlear duct; cochlea; morula; trigeminal ganglion; embryo; embryo; blastocyst; pineal gland; More reference expression data
BioGPS	n/a
Gene ontology
Molecular function	PDZ domain binding; enterobactin transmembrane transporter activity; sodium channel activity; cation channel activity; ligand-gated sodium channel activity; acid-sensing ion channel activity
Cellular component	cytoplasm; integral component of membrane; membrane; plasma membrane; integral component of plasma membrane; perinuclear region of cytoplasm
Biological process	detection of temperature stimulus involved in sensory perception; sensory perception; sodium ion transmembrane transport; detection of chemical stimulus involved in sensory perception of pain; detection of mechanical stimulus involved in sensory perception; sodium ion transport; enterobactin transport; response to mechanical stimulus; cation transport; response to heat; sensory perception of sour taste; ion transport; detection of chemical stimulus involved in sensory perception; cation transmembrane transport; detection of temperature stimulus involved in sensory perception of pain; ion transmembrane transport; signal transduction; response to acidic pH; detection of mechanical stimulus involved in sensory perception of pain
Sources:Amigo / QuickGO
Orthologs
Databases	NCBI: entry; OMA: entry
Species	Human	Mouse
Entrez	9311	171209
Ensembl	ENSG00000213199	ENSMUSG00000038276
UniProt	Q9UHC3	Q6X1Y6
RefSeq (mRNA)	NM_004769; NM_020321; NM_020322	NM_183000; NM_001310474
RefSeq (protein)	NP_004760; NP_064717; NP_064718	NP_001297403; NP_892045
Location (UCSC)	Chr 7: 151.05 – 151.05 Mb	Chr 5: 24.62 – 24.62 Mb
PubMed search
- Wikidata
View/Edit Human	View/Edit Mouse

Acid-sensing ion channel 3 (ASIC3) also known as amiloride-sensitive cation channel 3 (ACCN3) or testis sodium channel 1 (TNaC1) is a protein that in humans is encoded by the ASIC3 gene. The ASIC3 gene is one of the five paralogous genes that encode proteins that form trimeric acid-sensing ion channels (ASICs) in mammals. The cDNA of this gene was first cloned in 1998. The ASIC genes have splicing variants that encode different proteins that are called isoforms.

These genes are mainly expressed in the central and peripheral nervous system.

ASICs can form both homotrimeric (meaning composed of three identical subunits) and heterotrimeric channels.

== Structure and function ==
This gene encodes a member of the ASIC/ENaC superfamily of proteins. The members of this family are amiloride-sensitive sodium channels that contain intracellular N and C termini, 2 hydrophobic transmembrane (TM) regions, and a large extracellular loop, which has many cysteine residues with conserved spacing. The TM regions are generally symbolized as TM1 (close to N-terminus) and TM2 (close to C-terminus).

The pore of the channel through which ions selectively flow from the extracellular side into the cytoplasm is formed by the three TM2 regions of the trimer.

== Interactions ==
ASIC3 has been shown to interact with LIN7B, GOPC, MAGI1, and Ugr 9-1.
