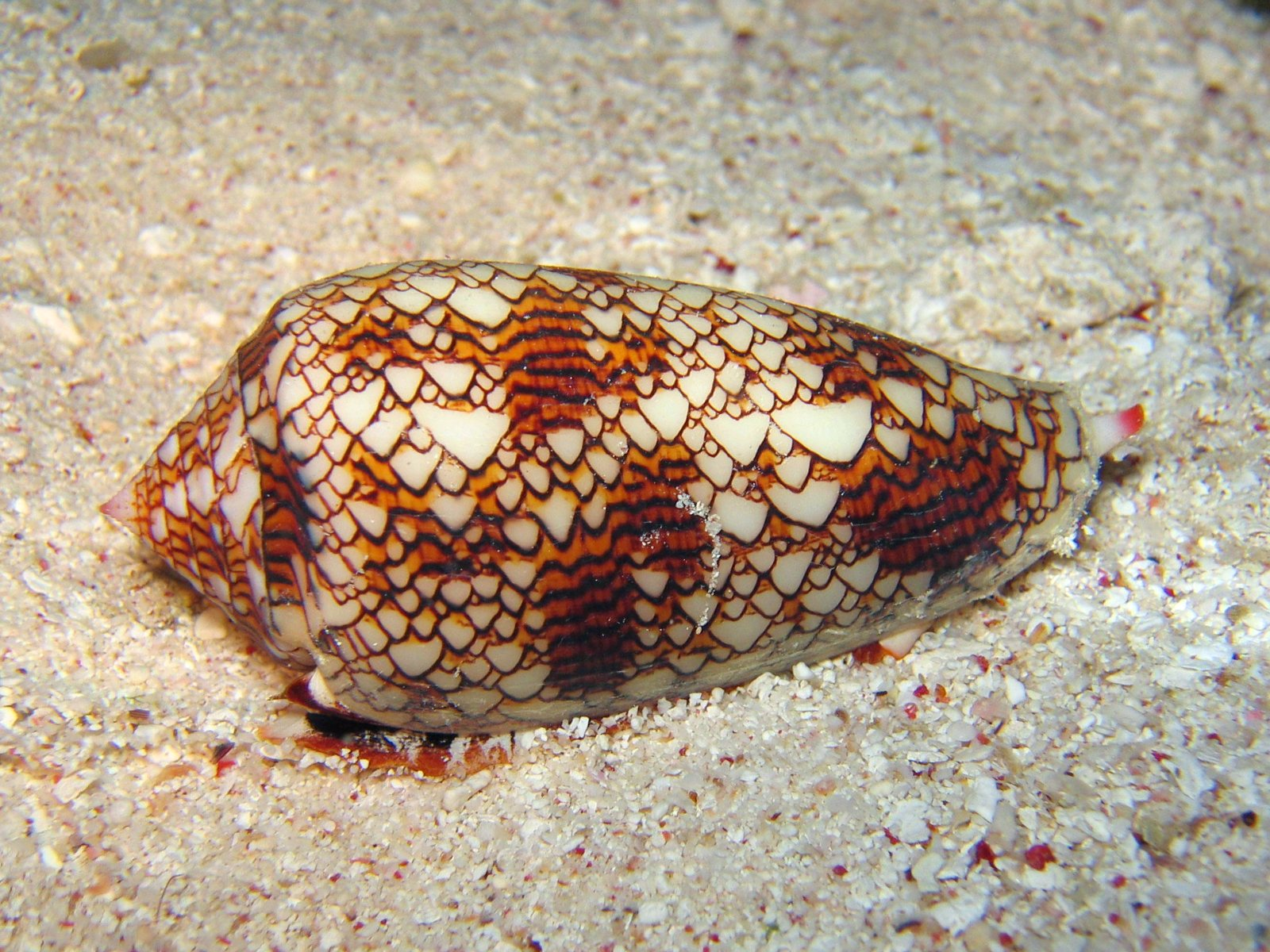
- A live individual of Conus textile, head end towards the right

Conservation status
- Least Concern (IUCN 3.1)

Scientific classification
- Kingdom: Animalia
- Phylum: Mollusca
- Class: Gastropoda
- Subclass: Caenogastropoda
- Order: Neogastropoda
- Superfamily: Conoidea
- Family: Conidae
- Genus: Conus
- Species: C. textile

Binomial name
- Conus textile Linnaeus, 1758

Synonyms
- See "List of synonyms"

= Conus textile =

Species of sea snail

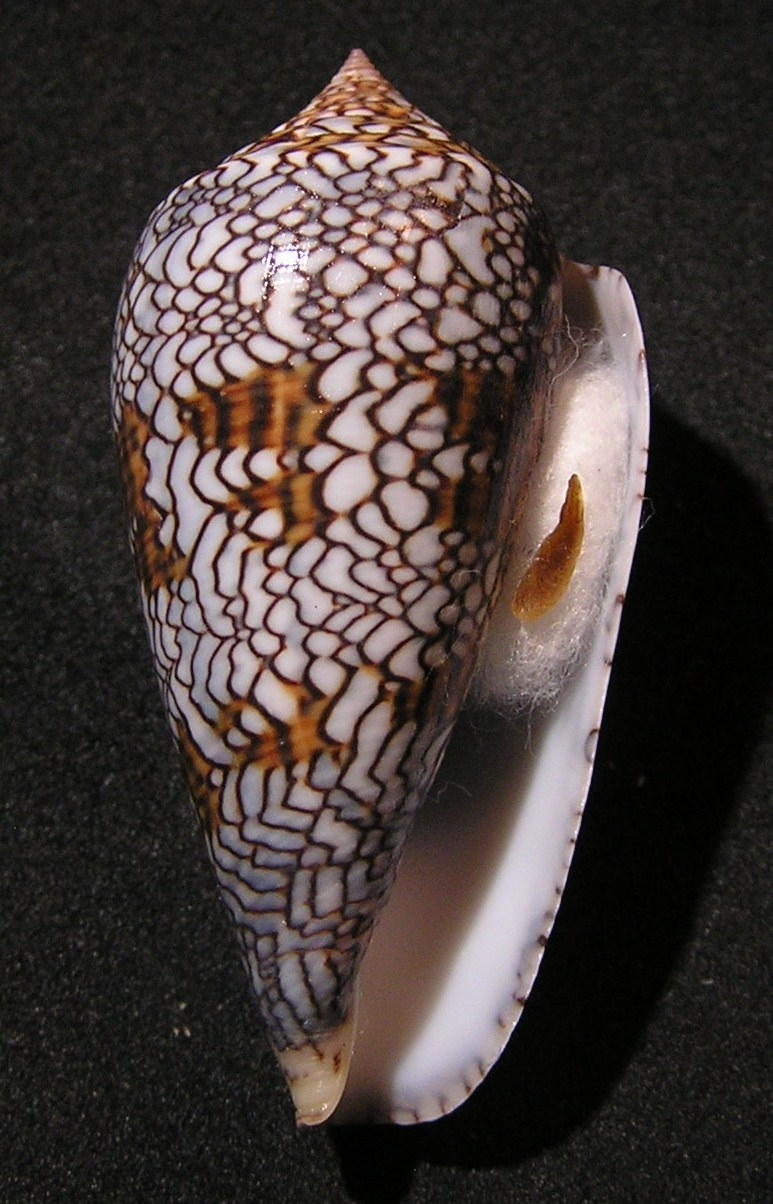
Apertural view of Conus textile textile forma archiepiscopus

Conus textile, the textile cone or cloth of gold cone, is a venomous species of sea snail, a marine gastropod mollusk in the family Conidae, the cone snails, cone shells or cones. Textile cone snails live mostly in the Indian Ocean, along the eastern coast of Africa and around Australia.

Like all species within the genus Conus, these snails are predatory and venomous. They are capable of stinging humans, therefore live ones should be handled carefully or not at all. Based on a report in 2004, about 30 human deaths have been attributed to cone snails.

== Subspecies ==
- Conus textile neovicarius da Motta, 1982
- Conus textile vaulberti Lorenz, 2012 (Mauritius)
- Conus textile dahlakensis da Motta, 1982 : synonym of Conus textile Linnaeus, 1758
- Conus textile var. abbreviata Dautzenberg, 1937: synonym of Conus ammiralis Linnaeus, 1758
- Conus textile var. euetrios G. B. Sowerby III : synonym of Conus textile Linnaeus, 1758
- Conus textile var. loman Dautzenberg, 1937 : synonym of Conus textile Linnaeus, 1758
- Conus textile var. ponderosa Dautzenberg, 1932 : synonym of Conus textile Linnaeus, 1758
- Conus textile var. sulcata G. B. Sowerby I, 1834 : synonym of Conus retifer Menke, 1829

== Shell description ==
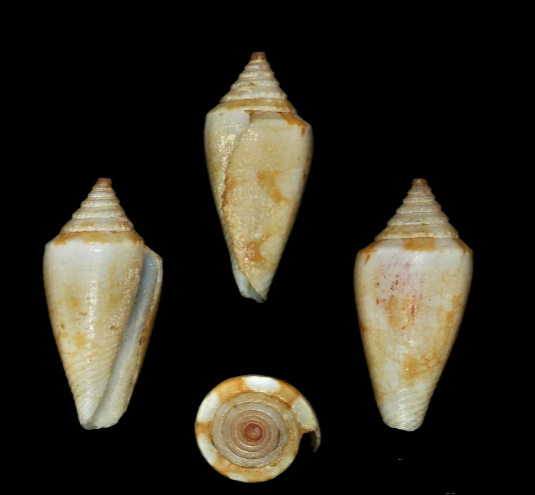
Conus textile, holotype of Conus dilectus at the Smithsonian Institution

Typical length of adults is about 9 cm to 10 cm (3.5 in to 3.9 in). The maximum shell length for this species is 15 cm (5.9 in). The color of the shell is yellowish brown, with undulating longitudinal lines of brown, interrupted by triangular white spaces. These last are irregularly disposed, but crowded at the shoulder, base and middle so as to form bands. The spire is similarly marked. The aperture is white.

=== Relations to cellular automata ===
Natural cellular automata generate the patterns on the shell. The pigment cells reside in a narrow band along the shell's lip. Each cell secretes pigments according to the activating and inhibiting activity of its neighbor pigment cells, obeying a natural version of a mathematical rule. The cell band leaves the colored pattern on the shell as it grows. Conus textile bears a pattern resembling Wolfram's rule 30 cellular automaton.

== Distribution ==
C. textile lives in the waters of the Red Sea, the tropical Indo-Pacific, off Australia (New South Wales, Northern Territory, Queensland and Western Australia), New Zealand, the Indian Ocean from eastern Africa to Hawaii, and French Polynesia. In Australia, C. textile is more commonly found in northern Queensland, but sightings are increasingly found further south into New South Wales due to warmer ocean temperatures associated with climate change.

== Ecology ==
=== Habitat ===
C. textile may be found in estuaries, on rocky shores and in rockpools. During the day they are usually buried in sand, and emerge to feed at night.

=== Life cycle ===
The female lays several hundred eggs at a time, which hatch after about 16 or 17 days. After hatching, the larvae float around in the current for approximately 16 days. Afterward, they settle at the bottom of the ocean. By this point their length is about 1.5 mm (0.06 in).

=== Feeding habits ===
C. textile is a carnivorous species, and uses a radula (a biological microscopic needle) to inject a conotoxin to kill its prey. Its venom contains the neurotoxin RPRFamide. The natural prey of C. textile consists of other snails such as cones and cowries. The proboscis, the tip of which holds the harpoon-like radular tooth, is capable of being extended to any part of its own shell. The living animal is a risk to any person handling it who has not taken proper care to protect exposed skin. Several human deaths have been attributed to this species.

== List of synonyms ==
This is a long list
- Conus (Cylinder) textile Linnaeus, 1758 · accepted, alternate representation
- Conus cholmondeleyi Melvill, 1900
- Conus communis Swainson, 1840
- Cylinder concatenatus Kiener, 1845
- Conus corbula G. B. Sowerby II, 1858
- Conus dilectus Gould, 1850
- Conus euetrios G. B. Sowerby III, 1882
- Conus eumitus Tomlin, 1926
- Conus panniculus Lamarck, 1810
- Conus reteaureum Perry, 1811
- Conus sirventi Fenaux, 1943
- Conus suzannae van Rossum, 1990
- Conus textile dahlakensis da Motta, 1982
- Conus textile var. euetrios G. B. Sowerby III
- Conus textile var. loman Dautzenberg, 1937
- Conus textile var. ponderosa Dautzenberg, 1932 (invalid: junior homonym of Conus quercinus var. ponderosa G.B. Sowerby, 1858)
- Conus textilinus Kiener, 1847 (synonym of Conus textile archiepiscopus)
- Conus tigrinus G. B. Sowerby II, 1858
- Conus undulatus [Lightfoot], 1786
- Conus verriculum Reeve, 1843
- Cucullus auratus Röding, 1798
- Cucullus auriger Röding, 1798
- Cucullus gloriamaris Röding, 1798
- Cylinder gloriamaris Perry, 1810
- Cylindrus panniculus Lamarck, 1810
- Cylindrus scriptus G. B. Sowerby II, 1858
- Cylindrus textile var. ponderosa Dautzenberg, 1932
- Cylindrus tigrinus G. B. Sowerby II, 1858
- Cylindrus verriculum Reeve, 1843
- Cylindrus aurelius Röding, 1798
- Cylindrus auriger Röding, 1798
- Cylindrus gloriamaris Röding, 1798
- Cylindrus textilis osullivani Iredale, 1931
- Cylindrus textilis
- Cylinder textile (Linnaeus, 1758)
- Darioconus textilis
- Darioconus textilis osullivani Iredale, 1931

== Literature ==
- Linnaeus, C. (1758). Systema Naturae per regna tria naturae, secundum classes, ordines, genera, species, cum characteribus, differentiis, synonymis, locis. Editio decima, reformata. Laurentius Salvius: Holmiae. ii, 824 pp
- Bruguière, M. 1792. Encyclopédie Méthodique ou par ordre de matières. Histoire naturelle des vers. Paris : Panckoucke Vol. 1 i-xviii, 757 pp.
- Röding, P.F. 1798. Museum Boltenianum sive Catalogus cimeliorum e tribus regnis naturae quae olim collegerat Joa. Hamburg : Trappii 199 pp.
- Lamarck, J.B.P.A. de M. 1810. Suite des espèces du genre Cône. Annales du Muséum National d'Histoire Naturelle. Paris 15: 263-286, 422-442
- Perry, G. 1811. Arcana, or The museum of natural history : containing the most recent discovered objects: embellished with coloured plates, and corresponding descriptions: with extracts relating to animals, and remarks of celebrated travellers; combining a general survey of nature. London : James Stratford pl. XLIX-LXXXIV.
- Swainson, W. 1840. A Treatise on Malacology or the Natural Classification of Shells and Shell-fish. London : Longman, Brown, Green & Longmans 419 pp.
- Reeve, L.A. 1843. Monograph of the genus Conus. pls 1-39 in Reeve, L.A. (ed.). Conchologica Iconica. London : L. Reeve & Co. Vol. 1.
- Kiener, L.C. 1845. Spécies général et Iconographie des coquilles vivantes, comprenant la collection du Muséum d'histoire Naturelle de Paris, la collection de Lamarck, celle du Prince Massena (appartenant maintenant a M. le Baron B. Delessert) et les découvertes récentes des voyageurs. Paris : Rousseau et Baillière Vol. 2.
- Gould, A.A. 1850. Shells collected by the United States Exploring Expedition under the command of Charles Wilkes. Proceedings of the Boston Society of Natural History 3: 169-172
- Sowerby, G.B. 1857-1858. Monograph of the genus Conus. 1-56, pls 1-24 in Thesaurus conchyliorum or monographs of genera of shells. London : Sowerby Vol. 3.
- Sowerby, G.B. (3rd) 1882. Descriptions of new species of shells in the collection of Mr. J. Cosmo Melvill. Proceedings of the Zoological Society of London 1882: 117-121
- Smith, E.A. 1891. On a collection of marine shells from Aden, with some remarks upon the relationship of the Molluscan Fauna of the Red Sea and the Mediterranean. Proceedings of the Zoological Society of London 1891(3): 390-436
- Melvill, J.C. 1900. A revision of textile cones with description of C. cholmondeleyi n. sp. Journal of Conchology 9: 303-311
- Smith, E.A. 1903. Marine Mollusca. pp. 589–630, pls 35-36 in Gardiner, J.S. (ed). The Fauna and Geography of the Maldive and Laccadive Archipelagoes. Being the account of work carried on and of the collections made by an expedition during the years 1899 and 1900. Cambridge : University Press Vol
- Dautzenberg, P. 1932. Mollusques testacés marins de Madagascar. Journal de Conchyliologie 76(1): 5-119, pl.
- Dautzenberg, P. 1937. Gastéropodes marins. 3-Famille Conidae'; Résultats Scientifiques du Voyage aux Indes Orientales Néerlandaises de LL. AA. RR. Le Prince et la Princesse Lé Belgique. Mémoires du Musée Royal d'Histoire Naturelle de Belgique 2(18): 284 pp, 3 pls
- Fenaux 1943. Complément a l'étude de la faune malcologique de Paumotou. Bulletin de l'Institut Océanographique Monaco 835: 3
- Demond, J. 1957. Micronesian reef associated gastropods. Pacific Science 11(3): 275-341, fig. 2, pl. 1
- Gillett, K. & McNeill, F. 1959. The Great Barrier Reef and Adjacent Isles: a comprehensive survey for visitor, naturalist and photographer. Sydney : Coral Press 209 pp.
- Wilson, B.R. & Gillett, K. 1971. Australian Shells: illustrating and describing 600 species of marine gastropods found in Australian waters. Sydney : Reed Books 168 pp.
- Hinton, A. 1972. Shells of New Guinea and the Central Indo-Pacific. Milton : Jacaranda Press xviii 94 pp.
- Salvat, B. & Rives, C. 1975. Coquillages de Polynésie. Tahiti : Papéete Les editions du pacifique, pp. 1–391.
- Cernohorsky, W.O. 1978. Tropical Pacific Marine Shells. Sydney : Pacific Publications 352 pp., 68 pls.
- Kay, E.A. 1979. Hawaiian Marine Shells. Reef and shore fauna of Hawaii. Section 4 : Mollusca. Honolulu, Hawaii : Bishop Museum Press Bernice P. Bishop Museum Special Publication Vol. 64(4) 653 pp.
- Motta, A.J. da 1983. Two new species of the genus Conus (Gastropoda: Conidae). Publicaçoes Ocasionais da Sociedade Portuguesa de Malacologia 2: 1-9
- Lauer, J. 1987. Tent marked cones; 4e partie. Rossiniana 36: 11-22
- Drivas, J. & M. Jay (1988). Coquillages de La Réunion et de l'île Maurice
- Rossum, H.M. van 1990. A new cone from the coasts of Kenya (Indian Ocean) (Gastropoda: Conidae). La Conchiglia 22(250-252): 29-31
- Wilson, B. 1994. Australian Marine Shells. Prosobranch Gastropods. Kallaroo, WA : Odyssey Publishing Vol. 2 370 pp.
- Röckel, D., Korn, W. & Kohn, A.J. 1995. Manual of the Living Conidae. Volume 1: Indo-Pacific Region. Wiesbaden : Hemmen 517 pp.
- Filmer R.M. (2001). A Catalogue of Nomenclature and Taxonomy in the Living Conidae 1758 - 1998. Backhuys Publishers, Leiden. 388pp.
- Branch, G.M. et al. (2002). Two Oceans. 5th impression. David Philip, Cate Town & Johannesburg
- Spencer, H.; Marshall. B. (2009). All Mollusca except Opisthobranchia. In: Gordon, D. (Ed.) (2009). New Zealand Inventory of Biodiversity. Volume One: Kingdom Animalia. 584 pp
- Tucker J.K. (2009). Recent cone species database. September 4, 2009 Edition
- Tucker J.K. & Tenorio M.J. (2009) Systematic classification of Recent and fossil conoidean gastropods. Hackenheim: Conchbooks. 296 pp
- Puillandre, N.; Duda, T.F.; Meyer, C.; Olivera, B.M.; Bouchet, P. (2015). "One, four or 100 genera? A new classification of the cone snails". Journal of Molluscan Studies. 81 (1): 1–23. doi:10.1093/mollus/eyu055. PMC 4541476. PMID 26300576.
- Lorenz, F., 2012. A new subspecies of Conidae from Mauritius (Gastropoda). Schriften zur Malakozoologie 27: 21-24
