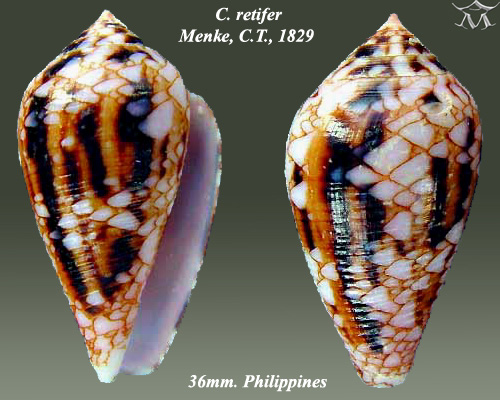
- Apertural and abapertural views of shell of Conus retifer Menke, C.T., 1829
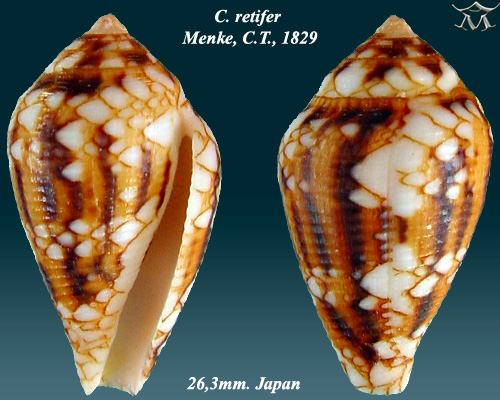

Scientific classification
- Kingdom: Animalia
- Phylum: Mollusca
- Class: Gastropoda
- Subclass: Caenogastropoda
- Order: Neogastropoda
- Superfamily: Conoidea
- Family: Conidae
- Genus: Conus
- Species: C. retifer

Binomial name
- Conus retifer Menke, 1829

Synonyms
- Conus (Cylinder) retifer (Menke, 1829) · accepted, alternate representation; Conus solidus G. B. Sowerby I, 1841 (invalid: junior homonym of Conus solidus Gmelin, 1791); Conus textile var. sulcata G. B. Sowerby I, 1834 (invalid: junior homonym of Conus sulcatus Hwass in Bruguière, 1792; Conus solidus G.B. Sowerby I, 1841, is a replacement name); Cylinder retifer (Menke, 1829); Gastridium retifer Salvat, B. & Rives, C. 1975

= Conus retifer =

Species of sea snail

Conus retifer, common name the netted cone, is a species of sea snail, a marine gastropod mollusk in the family Conidae, the cone snails and their allies.

Like all species within the genus Conus, these snails are predatory and venomous. They are capable of stinging humans, therefore live ones should be handled carefully or not at all.

== Description ==
The size of the shell varies between 25 mm and 69 mm. The shell is pear-shaped, with revolving striae. Its color is reticulated orange-brown with large and small triangular white patches, and zigzag longitudinal chocolate markings, mostly interrupted so as to form one or two bands. The interior of the aperture is light violaceous.

== Distribution ==
This marine species has a wide distribution in the tropical Indo-West Pacific: Mozambique, Tanzania, the Mascarene Islands, Indo-China, Indo-Malaysia, Oceania; and off Australia (Christmas Island)
