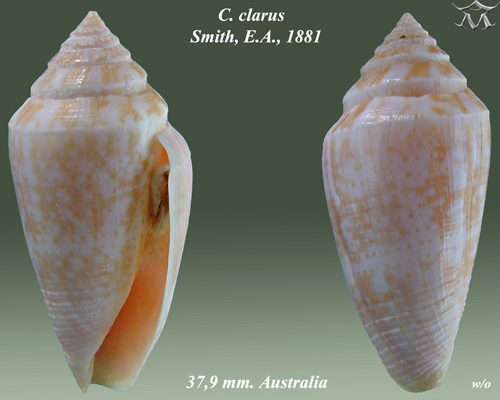
- Apertural and abapertural views of shell of Conus clarus Smith, E.A., 1881
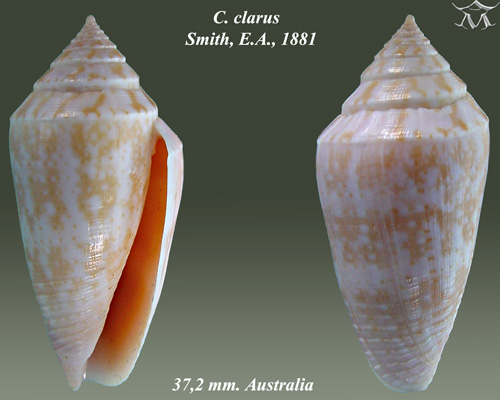

Conservation status
- Least Concern (IUCN 3.1)

Scientific classification
- Kingdom: Animalia
- Phylum: Mollusca
- Class: Gastropoda
- Subclass: Caenogastropoda
- Order: Neogastropoda
- Superfamily: Conoidea
- Family: Conidae
- Genus: Conus
- Species: C. clarus

Binomial name
- Conus clarus E. A. Smith, 1881

Synonyms
- Austroconus clarus (E. A. Smith, 1881); Conus (Austroconus) clarus E. A. Smith, 1881; Conus (Mamiconus) clarus E.A. Smith, 1881 · accepted, alternate representation; Conus segravei Gatliff, 1891

= Conus clarus =

Species of sea snail

Conus clarus, common name the glossy cone, is a species of sea snail, a marine gastropod mollusk in the family Conidae, the cone snails and their allies.

Like all species within the genus Conus, these snails are predatory and venomous. They are capable of stinging humans, therefore live ones should be handled carefully or not at all.

== Description ==
The size of the shell varies between 22 mm and 54 mm. The shell is abbreviately turbinate and sulcate towards the base. Its color is rosy white. The spire is depressed-conical, striate. The angle of the body whorl is carinated. The aperture is light rosaceous.

== Distribution ==
This marine species occurs from Southeast Africa to Australia (South Australia, Tasmania, Victoria and Western Australia).
