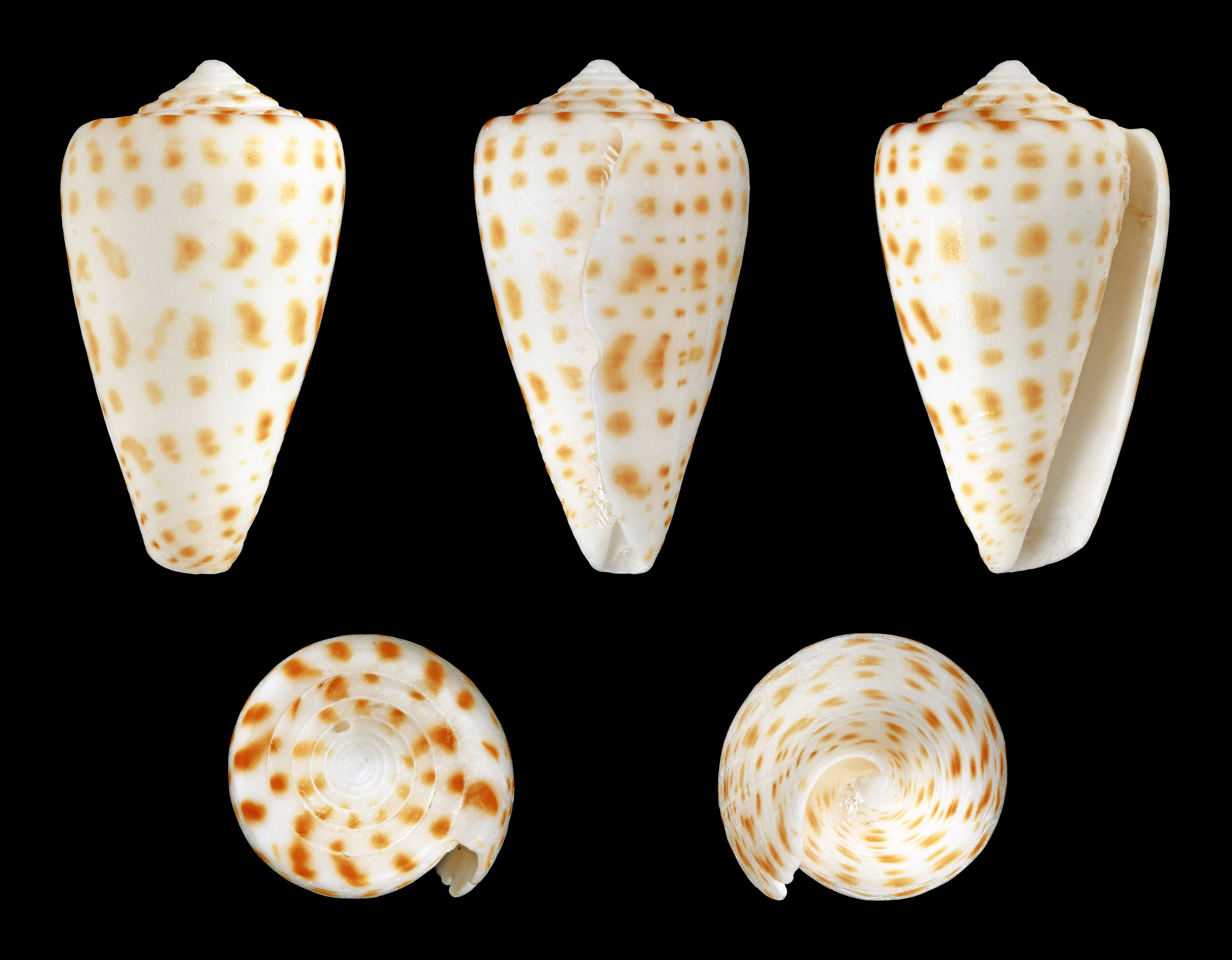
- Lindaconus spurius
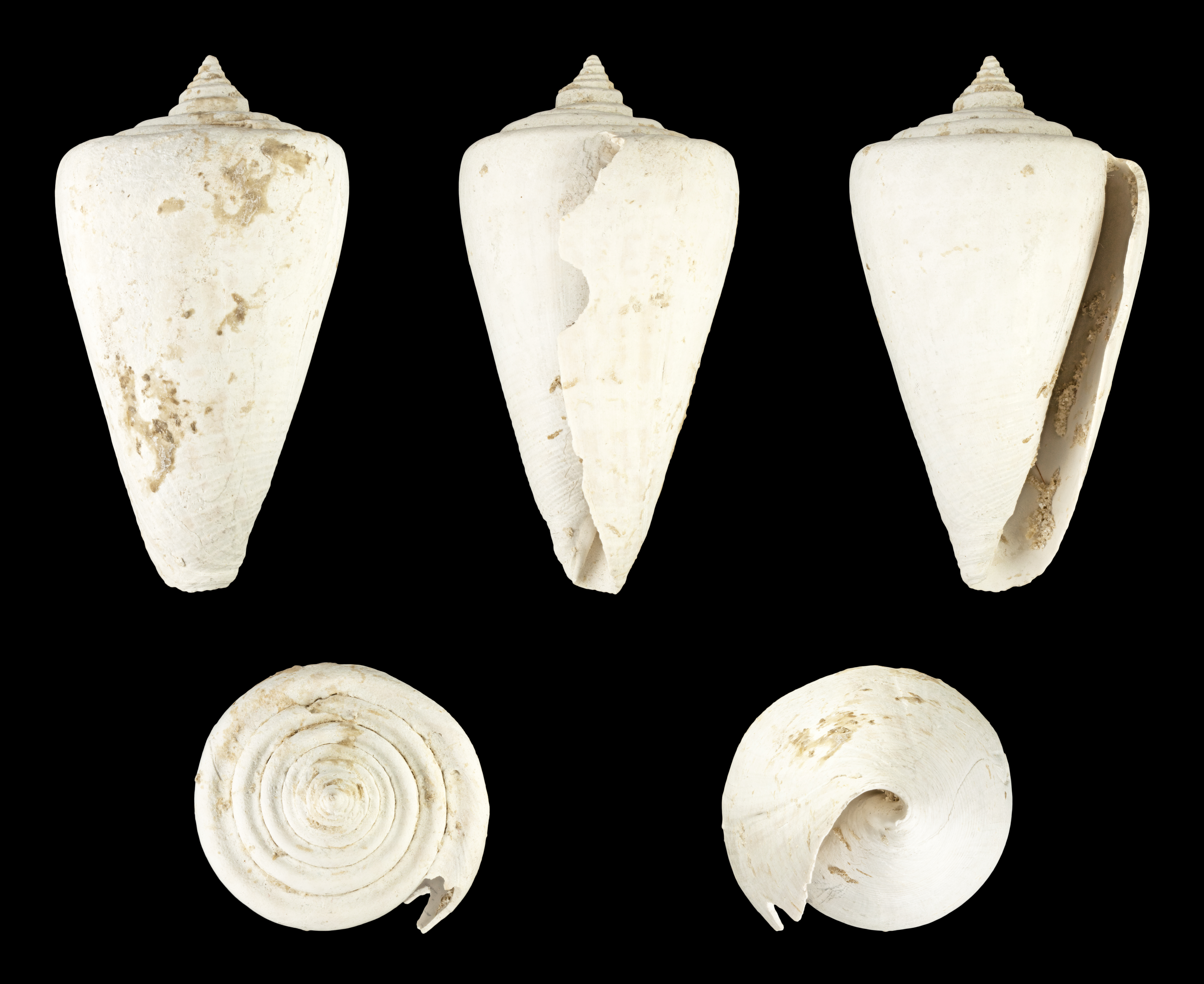
- Fossil, Pliocene

Scientific classification
- Kingdom: Animalia
- Phylum: Mollusca
- Class: Gastropoda
- Subclass: Caenogastropoda
- Order: Neogastropoda
- Superfamily: Conoidea
- Family: Conidae
- Genus: Conus
- Species: C. spurius

Binomial name
- Conus spurius Gmelin, 1791

Synonyms
- Conus (Lindaconus) spurius Gmelin, 1791 · accepted, alternate representation; Conus (Spuriconus) spurius Gmelin, 1791; Conus leoninus Hwass in Bruguière, 1792 (invalid: junior homonym of Conus spurius [Lightfoot], 1786); Conus ochraceus Lamarck, 1810; Conus paulina Kiener, 1850; Conus proteus Hwass in Bruguière, 1792; Conus spurius arubaensis Nowell-Usticke, 1968; Conus spurius atlanticus Clench, 1942; Conus weinkauffii Löbbecke, 1882; Cucullus ferugineus Röding, 1798; Cucullus flammeus Röding, 1798; Cucullus gualterianus Röding, 1798; Cucullus leoninus Röding, 1798; Cucullus syriacus Röding, 1798; Lindaconus spurius (Gmelin, 1791); Spuriconus spurius (Gmelin, 1791)

= Conus spurius =

Species of sea snail

Conus spurius, common name the alphabet cone, is a species of sea snail, a marine gastropod mollusk in the family Conidae, the cone snails and their allies.

Like all species within the genus Conus, these snails are predatory and venomous. They are capable of stinging humans, therefore live ones should be handled carefully or not at all.

Subspecies

- Conus spurius aureofasciatus Rehder & Abbott, 1951(synonym: Lindaconus spurius aureofasciatus (Rehder & Abbott, 1951))
- Conus spurius baylei Jousseaume, 1872 (synonyms: Conus baylei Jousseaume, 1872; Lindaconus spurius baylei (Jousseaume, 1872) )
- Conus spurius lorenzianus Dillwyn, 1817 (synonyms: Conus flammeus Lamarck, 1810 (invalid: junior secondary homonym of Cucullus flammeus Röding, 1798; C. phlogopus is a replacement name); Conus lorenzianus Dillwyn, 1817; Conus phlogopus Tomlin, 1937; Conus undatus Kiener, 1847; Lindaconus spurius lorenzianus (Dillwyn, 1817))
- Conus spurius spurius Gmelin, 1791 (synonym: Lindaconus spurius spurius (Gmelin, 1791))

== Distribution ==
This marine species occurs from East Florida to Venezuela; also off the West Indies.

== Description ==
The maximum recorded shell length is 80 mm. The shell is white, with revolving series of spots and irregular or cloud-like markings of orange, chestnut or chocolate, often forming interrupted bands. The base of the shell is grooved. The spire shows a single broad sulcus.

== Larval stage ==
Conus spurius larvae hatch from egg capsules, swim for a couple of hours at most, then settle to the bottom as young adults.

Aided by currents, it is at this larval stage when range extension of the species is achieved.

== Habitat ==
Minimum recorded depth is 0 m. Maximum recorded depth is 64 m.
