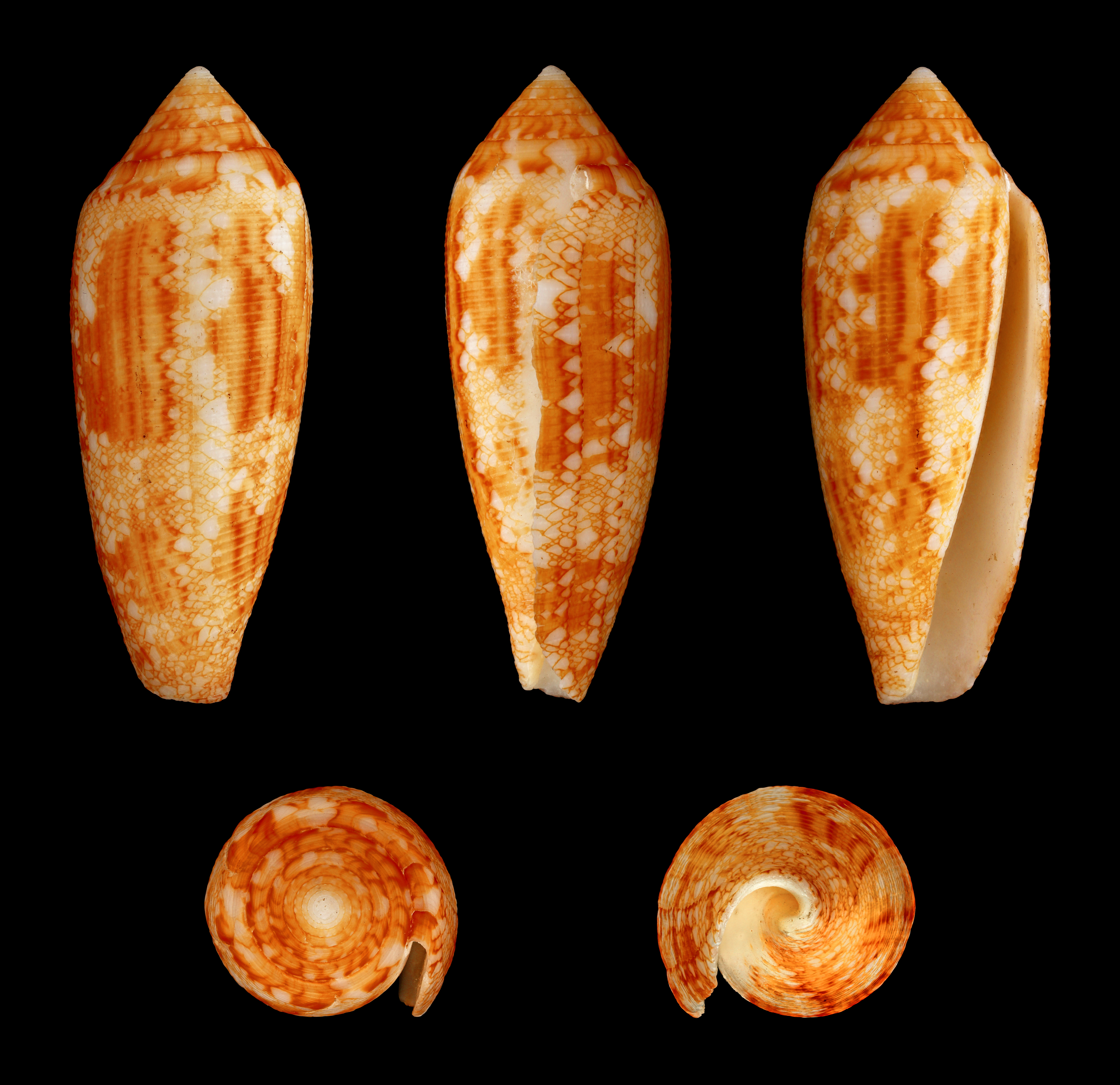
- Five views of a shell of Conus aureus Hwass in Bruguière, 1792

Conservation status
- Least Concern (IUCN 3.1)

Scientific classification
- Kingdom: Animalia
- Phylum: Mollusca
- Class: Gastropoda
- Subclass: Caenogastropoda
- Order: Neogastropoda
- Superfamily: Conoidea
- Family: Conidae
- Genus: Conus
- Species: C. aureus

Binomial name
- Conus aureus Hwass in Bruguière, 1792

Synonyms
- Conus (Cylinder) aureus Hwass in Bruguière, 1792 · accepted, alternate representation; Conus aureus aureus Hwass in Bruguière, 1792; Conus auricomus Lamarck, 1810 (invalid: junior homonym of Conus auricomus Hwass in Bruguière, 1792); Cylinder aureus (Hwass in Bruguière, 1792); Cylinder aureus aureus (Hwass in Bruguière, 1792)

= Conus aureus =

Species of sea snail

Conus aureus, common name the aureus cone, is a species of sea snail, a marine gastropod mollusk in the family Conidae, the cone snails and their allies.

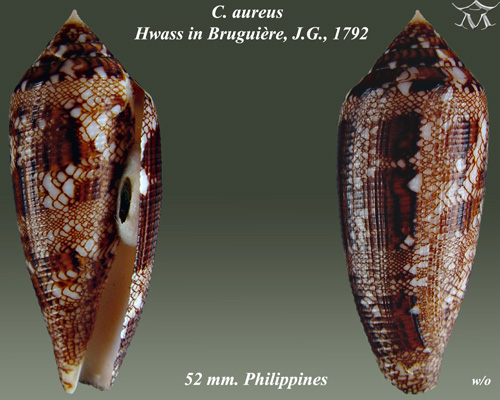
Conus aureus Hwass in Bruguière, J.G., 1792

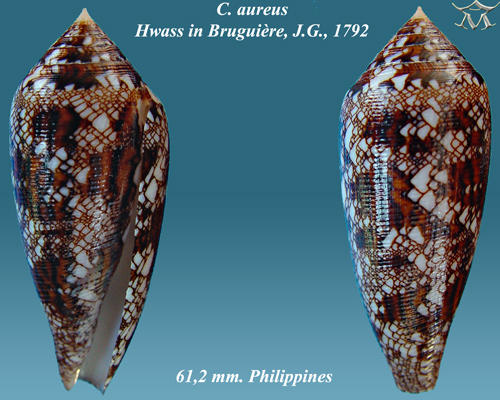
Conus aureus Hwass in Bruguière, J.G., 1792

Like all species within the genus Conus, these snails are predatory and venomous. They are capable of envenoming humans, therefore live ones should be handled carefully or preferably not at all.

Subspecies

- Conus aureus paulucciae G. B. Sowerby III, 1887

== Distribution ==
This marine species occurs off New Caledonia, Tuamotu, Indo-China, Indo-Malaysia and from Japan to Queensland, Australia.

== Description ==
The size of the shell varies between 40 mm and 80 mm. The shell is subcylindrical, with fine revolving striae. It has an orange-brown color, very finely reticulated with chestnut, with larger subtriangular spots of white, aggregated into masses and bands at the shoulder, middle and base. There are usually a number of longitudinal streaks of chestnut running over the orange-brown reticulated spaces.
