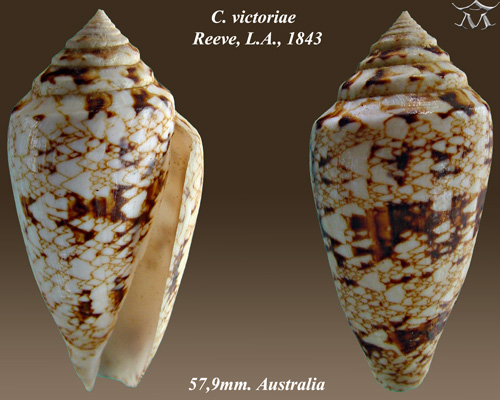
- Apertural and abapertural views of shell of Conus victoriae Reeve, L.A., 1843
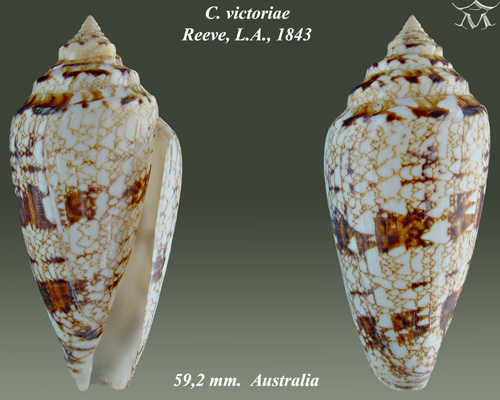

Scientific classification
- Kingdom: Animalia
- Phylum: Mollusca
- Class: Gastropoda
- Subclass: Caenogastropoda
- Order: Neogastropoda
- Superfamily: Conoidea
- Family: Conidae
- Genus: Conus
- Species: C. victoriae

Binomial name
- Conus victoriae Reeve, 1843

Synonyms
- Conus (Cylinder) victoriae Reeve, 1843 · accepted, alternate representation; Conus complanatus G. B. Sowerby II, 1866; Cylinder victoriae (Reeve, 1843)

= Conus victoriae =

Species of sea snail

Conus victoriae, common name the Queen Victoria cone, is a species of sea snail, a marine gastropod mollusk in the family Conidae, the cone snails and their allies.

Like all species within the genus Conus, these snails are predatory and venomous. They are capable of stinging humans, therefore live ones should be handled carefully or not at all.

== Taxonomy ==
Conus nodulosus has often been treated as a geographical variant or subspecies of C. victoriae. They have a disjunct distribution, the latter occurring from Exmouth to the Western Australia / Northern Territory border, whereas nodulosus has a distribution restricted from Geraldton to Calbary and the Abrolhos. For conservation implications, the two are here listed as distinct.

== Description ==
The size of the shell varies between 35 and 94 mm (1.4 and 3.7 in). Conus victoriae is a mollusc-eating cone (molluscivore) possibly related to Conus textile . It differs from Conus textile in the reticulations. These are mostly smaller, arid light-colored, contrasting strongly with the bands of very dark chocolate longitudinal stripes. They are also more or less overlaid with violaceous clouds.

A component of its venom, alpha conotoxin Vc1.1 (ACV1) has been shown to be a potent analgesic in pain tests in animals and is a potential replacement for morphine for the treatment of neuropathic pain.

The biology of this cone species has been extensively studied, in particular the embryonic development of its venom apparatus, the expression of the venom gland proteome and the role of the venom bulb in delivery of venom components to the radulae.

== Distribution ==
This marine species is endemic to Australia (Western Australia from Broome north to the mouth of the Victoria River, Northern Territory where it was first discovered by Reeve in 1843)

== Gallery ==
Conus victoriae Reeve, L.A., 1843

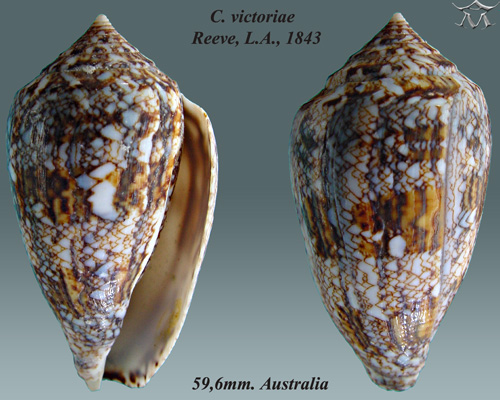
Conus victoriae Reeve, L.A., 1843

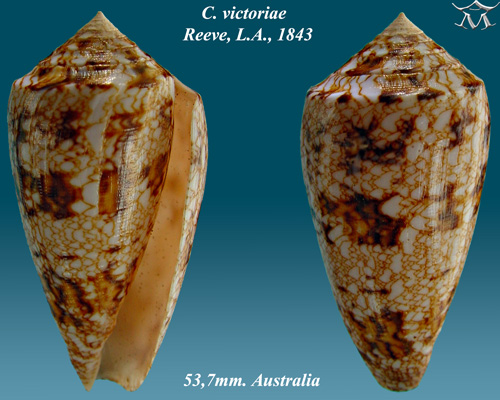
Conus victoriae Reeve, L.A., 1843

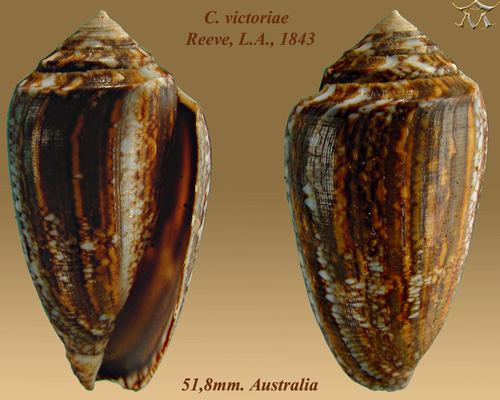
Conus victoriae Reeve, L.A., 1843

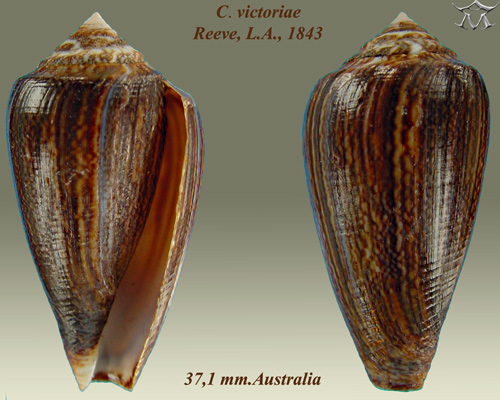
Conus victoriae Reeve, L.A., 1843
