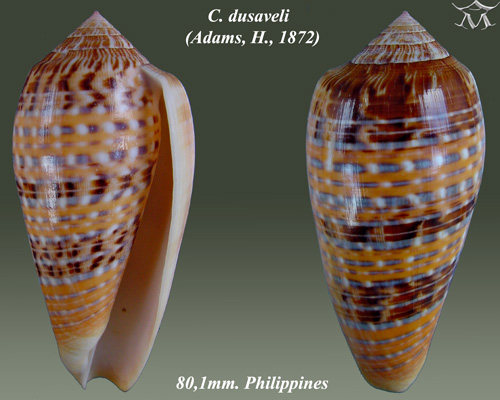
- Apertural and abapertural views of shell of Conus dusaveli (H. Adams, 1872)

Scientific classification
- Kingdom: Animalia
- Phylum: Mollusca
- Class: Gastropoda
- Subclass: Caenogastropoda
- Order: Neogastropoda
- Family: Conidae
- Genus: Conus
- Subgenus: Textilia; Swainson, 1840

Type species
- Conus bullatus Linnaeus, 1758

Synonyms
- Textilia Swainson, 1840

= Conus (Textilia) =

Subgenus of gastropods

Textilia is a subgenus of sea snails, marine gastropod mollusks in the genus Conus, family Conidae, the cone snails and their allies.

== Species ==
Species within the genus Textilia include:

- Textilia adamsonii (Broderip, 1836): synonym of Conus adamsonii Broderip, 1836 (alternate representation)
- Textilia bullata (Linnaeus, 1758): synonym of Conus bullatus Linnaeus, 1758 (alternate representation)
- Textilia cervus (Lamarck, 1822): synonym of Conus cervus Lamarck, 1822 (alternate representation)
- Textilia chiapponorum (Lorenz, 2004): synonym of Conus chiapponorum Lorenz, 2004 (alternate representation)
- Textilia dusaveli (H. Adams, 1872): synonym of Conus dusaveli (H. Adams, 1872) (alternate representation)
- Textilia floccata (G.B. Sowerby I, 1841): synonym of Conus floccatus G.B. Sowerby I, 1841 (alternate representation)
- Textilia julii (Lienard, 1870): synonym of Conus julii Lienard, 1870 (alternate representation)
- Textilia lucasi Bozzetti, 2010: synonym of Conus lucasi (Bozzetti, 2010)
- Textilia proxima (G.B. Sowerby II, 1860): synonym of Conus proximus G.B. Sowerby II, 1860 (alternate representation)
- Textilia solangeae (Bozzetti, 2004): synonym of Conus solangeae Bozzetti, 2004 (alternate representation)
- Textilia stercusmuscarum (Linnaeus, 1758): synonym of Conus stercusmuscarum Linnaeus, 1758 (alternate representation)
- Textilia timorensis (Hwass in Bruguière, 1792): synonym of Conus timorensis Hwass in Bruguière, 1792 (alternate representation)
- Textilia vicweei (Old, 1973): synonym of Conus vicweei Old, 1973 (alternate representation)

The following species were brought into synonymy

- Textilia benten Shikama, 1977: synonym of Conus dusaveli (H. Adams, 1872)
- Textilia pongo Shikama, 1977: synonym of Conus bullatus Linnaeus, 1758
