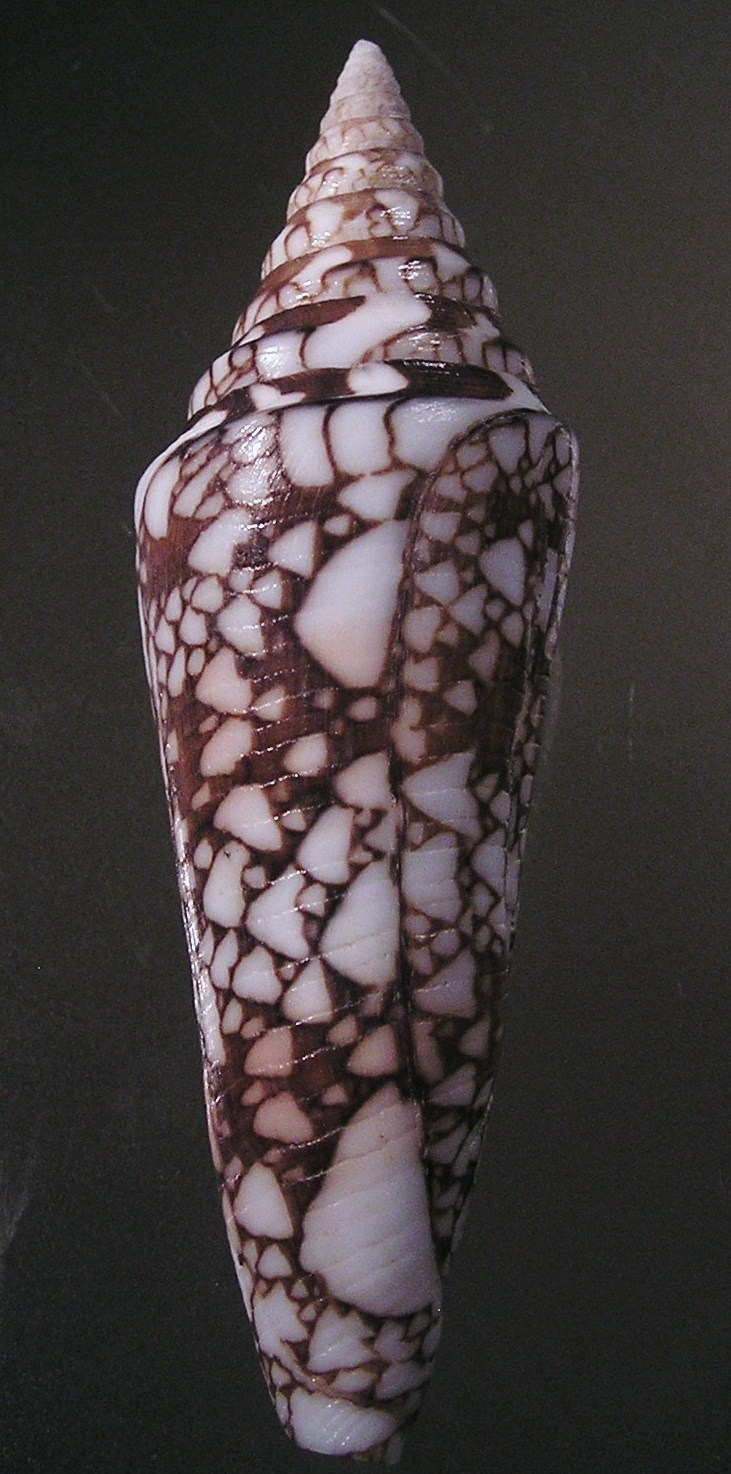
- Abapertural view of a shell of Leptoconus milneedwardsi (Jousseaume, 1894)

Scientific classification
- Kingdom: Animalia
- Phylum: Mollusca
- Class: Gastropoda
- Subclass: Caenogastropoda
- Order: Neogastropoda
- Family: Conidae
- Genus: Conus
- Subgenus: Leptoconus; Swainson, 1840

Type species
- Conus amadis Gmelin, 1791

Synonyms
- Leptoconus Swainson, 1840; Nataliconus Tucker & Tenorio, 2009

= Conus (Leptoconus) =

Subgenus of gastropods

Leptoconus is a subgenus of sea snails, marine gastropod molluscs in the genus Conus, family Conidae, the cone snails and their allies.

In the latest classification of the family Conidae by Puillandre N., Duda T.F., Meyer C., Olivera B.M. & Bouchet P. (2015), Leptoconus has become a subgenus of Conus as Conus (Leptoconus) Swainson, 1840 (type species: Conus amadis Gmelin, 1791) represented as Conus Linnaeus, 1758

== Distinguishing characteristics ==
The Tucker & Tenorio 2009 taxonomy distinguishes Leptoconus from Conus in the following ways:

- Genus Conus sensu stricto Linnaeus, 1758

Shell characters (living and fossil species)

The basic shell shape is conical to elongated conical, has a deep anal notch on the shoulder, a smooth periostracum and a small operculum. The shoulder of the shell is usually nodulose and the protoconch is usually multispiral. Markings often include the presence of tents except for black or white color variants, with the absence of spiral lines of minute tents and textile bars.

Radular tooth (not known for fossil species)

The radula has an elongated anterior section with serrations and a large exposed terminating cusp, a non-obvious waist, blade is either small or absent and has a short barb, and lacks a basal spur.

Geographical distribution

These species are found in the Indo-Pacific region.

Feeding habits

These species eat other gastropods including cones.

- Subgenus Leptoconus Swainson, 1840

Shell characters (living and fossil species)

The shell is turbinate to elongated conical in shape, and the spire is either concave or straight and turriculated in profile. The protoconch has 1.5 whorls. The shell is ornamented with nodules which may persist or die out early. The anal notch is deep. The color pattern includes spiral rows of minute tents, however textile bars are absent. The periostracum is smooth, and the operculum is small.

Radular tooth (not known for fossil species)

The anterior section of the radular tooth is significantly longer than the length of posterior section. A basal spur is usually absent, and the barb and blade are short. The waist is not obvious. The radular tooth has serrations, and a terminating cusp.

Geographical distribution

These species are found in the Indo-Pacific region.

Feeding habits

These species are molluscivorus, meaning that these cone snails prey on other mollusks.

== Species list ==
This list of species is based on the information in the World Register of Marine Species (WoRMS) list. Species within the genus Leptoconus include:

- Leptoconus (Phasmoconus) dusaveli H. Adams, 1872 accepted as Checked: verified by a taxonomic editorConus dusaveli (H. Adams, 1872)
- Leptoconus abbotti (Clench, 1942): synonym of Conus jucundus G. B. Sowerby III, 1887
- Leptoconus amadis (Gmelin, 1791): synonym of Conus amadis Gmelin, 1791
- Leptoconus ammiralis (Linnaeus, 1758): synonym of Conus ammiralis Linnaeus, 1758
- Leptoconus biraghii G. Raybaudi, 1992: synonym of Conus biraghii (G. Raybaudi, 1992)
- Leptoconus dusaveli H. Adams, 1872: synonym of Conus dusaveli (H. Adams, 1872)
- Leptoconus gernanti Petuch, 1975: synonym of Conus ambiguus Reeve, 1844
- Leptoconus hamanni (Fainzilber & Mienis, 1986): synonym of Conus hamanni Fainzilber & Mienis, 1986
- Leptoconus illawarra Garrard, 1961: synonym of Conus sydneyensis G. B. Sowerby III, 1887
- Leptoconus kawamurai (Habe, 1962): synonym of Conus kawamurai Habe, 1962
- Leptoconus locumtenens (Blumenbach, 1791): synonym of Conus locumtenens Blumenbach, 1791
- Leptoconus mappa: synonym of Conus mappa Lightfoot, 1786
- Leptoconus milneedwardsi (Jousseaume, 1894): synonym of Conus milneedwardsi Jousseaume, 1894
- Leptoconus temnes Iredale, 1930: synonym of Conus ammiralis Linnaeus, 1758
