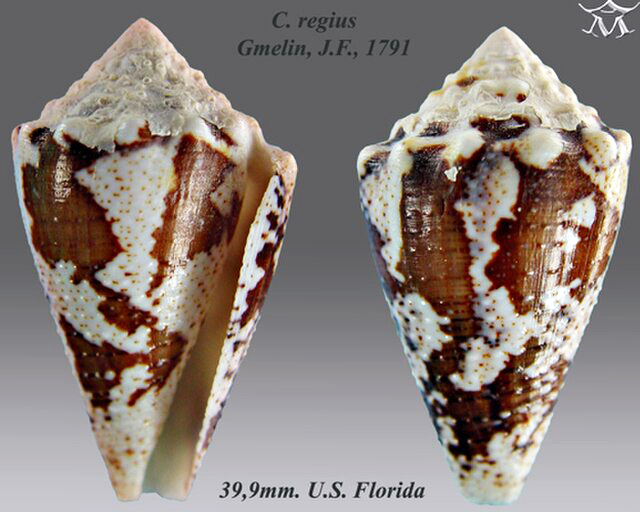

Conservation status
- Least Concern (IUCN 3.1)

Scientific classification
- Kingdom: Animalia
- Phylum: Mollusca
- Class: Gastropoda
- Subclass: Caenogastropoda
- Order: Neogastropoda
- Superfamily: Conoidea
- Family: Conidae
- Genus: Conus
- Species: C. regius

Binomial name
- Conus regius Gmelin, 1791

Synonyms
- Conus (Stephanoconus) regius Gmelin, 1791 · accepted, alternate representation; Conus ammiralis var. regius Gmelin, 1791 (original combination); Conus citrinus Gmelin, 1791; Conus gadesi Espinosa & Ortea, 2005; Conus leucostictus Gmelin, 1791; Conus nebulosus Hwass in Bruguière, 1792 (invalid: junior homonym of Conus nebulosus Gmelin, 1791); Conus spurius (Röding, 1798); Cucullus coronacivica Röding, 1798; Cucullus spurius Röding, 1798; Stephanoconus regius (Gmelin, 1791)

= Conus regius =

Species of sea snail

Conus regius, common name the "crown cone", is a species of sea snail, a marine gastropod mollusk in the family Conidae, the cone snails and their allies.

Like all species within the genus Conus, these snails are predatory and venomous. They are capable of stinging and injuring or killing humans, therefore live ones should be handled carefully or not at all.

The subspecies Conus regius abbotti Clench, 1942 is a synonym of Conus jucundus G. B. Sowerby III, 1887

== Distribution ==
Type locality, designated by Clench, 1942: Jaimanitas, near Havana, Cuba.

This marine species occurs from in the Caribbean Sea and in the Gulf of Mexico; in the Atlantic Ocean off Brazil.

== Description ==
The maximum recorded shell length is 75 mm. The following images show variation in shell color and markings: The shell has a low, distantly but distinctly tuberculated spire, and direct sides. It is slightly striate at the base. The color of the shell knows many variations. It is usually chestnut brown with blue-white spots, but white, yellow brown and pale brown variations occur as well. The aperture has a white interior, sometimes with chestnut blotches.

== Venom ==
The conotoxin reg2a from the C. regius is composed by 16 amino acid residues and 4 cysteines, it's considered the most potent antagonist known of acetylcholine receptors in the vertebrate brain, that have the highest affinity for nicotine. C. regius is known to have more different conotoxins than any other Cone sail species, its conotoxin it's potentially of considered of medical importance in affecting nicotine addiction. Its venom is reported to block the calcium receptors in vertebrate sensory nerve cells, which stop the nerve impulse for propagating along the nerve.

== Gallery ==
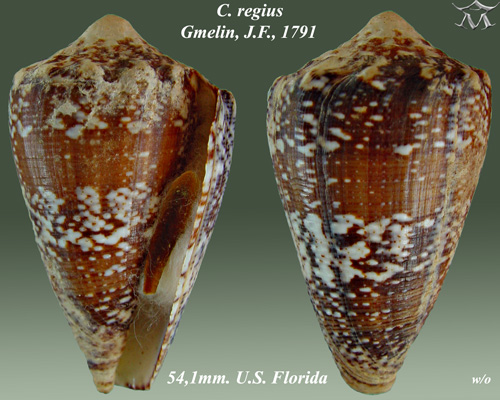
Conus regius Gmelin, J.F., 1791

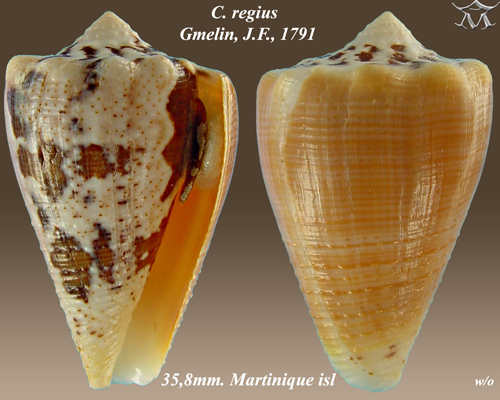
Conus regius Gmelin, J.F., 1791

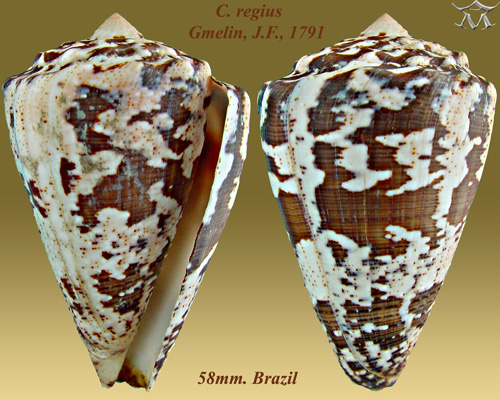
Conus regius Gmelin, J.F., 1791

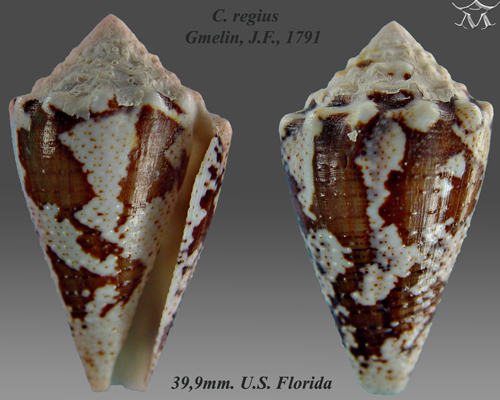
Conus regius Gmelin, J.F., 1791

== Habitat ==
Minimum recorded depth is 0 m. Maximum recorded depth is 95 m.
