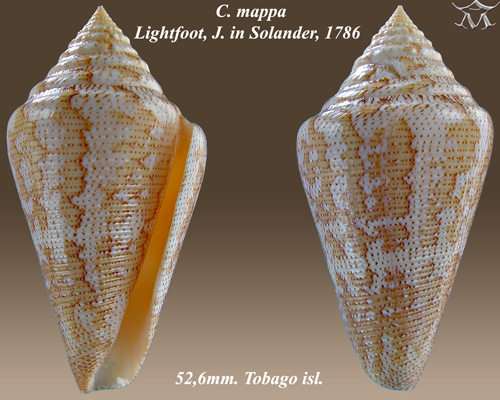
- Apertural and abapertural views of shell of Conus mappa Lightfoot, J. in Solander, 1786
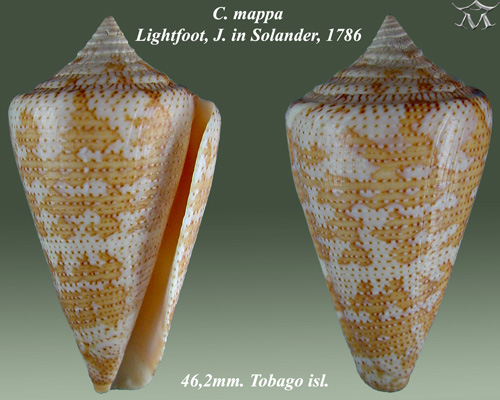

Scientific classification
- Kingdom: Animalia
- Phylum: Mollusca
- Class: Gastropoda
- Subclass: Caenogastropoda
- Order: Neogastropoda
- Superfamily: Conoidea
- Family: Conidae
- Genus: Conus
- Species: C. mappa

Binomial name
- Conus mappa Lightfoot, 1786

Synonyms
- Conus (Stephanoconus) mappa [Lightfoot], 1786 · accepted, alternate representation; Conus catenatus G. B. Sowerby III, 1879 (renamed Conus desmotus Tomlin, 1937, synonym of Conus mappa granarius Kiener, 1845); Conus cedonulli var. mappa Hwass in Bruguière, 1792; Conus cedonulli var. surinamensis Hwass in Bruguière, 1792 (invalid: junior homonym of Conus ammiralis var. surinamensis Gmelin, 1791); Conus desmotus Tomlin, 1937 (synonym of Conus mappa granarius Kiener, 1845); Conus mappa Hwass in Bruguière, 1792 (synonym of Conus mappa Lightfoot, 1786); Conus surinamensis Hwass in Bruguière, 1792; Leptoconus mappa (Lightfoot, 1786); Protoconus mappa (Lightfoot, 1786); Tenorioconus mappa (Lightfoot, 1786)

= Conus mappa =

Species of sea snail

Conus mappa is a species of sea snail, a marine gastropod mollusk in the family Conidae, the cone snails and their allies.

There are two recognized subspecies:

- Conus mappa jesusramirezi (Cossignani, 2010)
- Conus mappa trinitarius Hwass in Bruguière, 1792.
- Conus mappa granarius Kiener, 1845.: synonym of Conus granarius

The junior homonym Conus mappa Crosse, 1858 is a synonym of Conus eldredi Morrison, 1955.

Like all species within the genus Conus, these snails are predatory and venomous. They are capable of stinging humans, therefore live ones should be handled carefully or not at all.

== Description ==
The size of the wide shell varies between 36 mm and 67 mm. The spire contains small nodules and has a smooth shoulder. The body whorl is smooth and has a very variable color pattern of milkish white to pinkish white with two spiral bands of greenish yellow to darker brown. These bands are broken into irregular patches. The spiral whorls show very fine longitudinal grooves. The aperture is whitish.

== Distribution ==
This species occurs in the Caribbean Sea off Venezuela, Trinidad - and Barbados where it occurs only at 85 fathoms (155 metres) depth

== Gallery ==
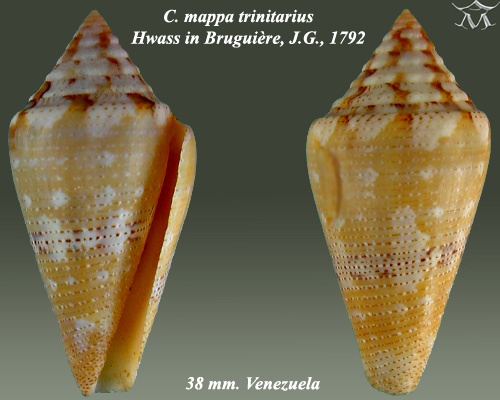
Conus mappa trinitarius Hwass in Bruguière, J.G., 1792

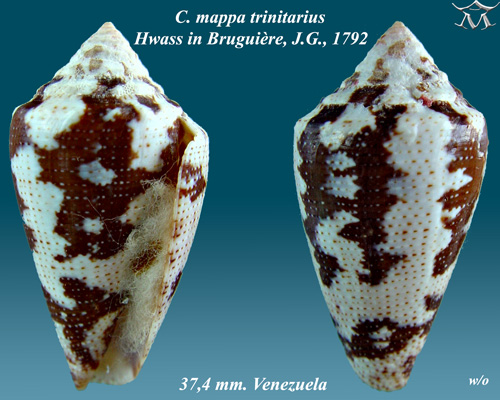
Conus mappa trinitarius Hwass in Bruguière, J.G., 1792
