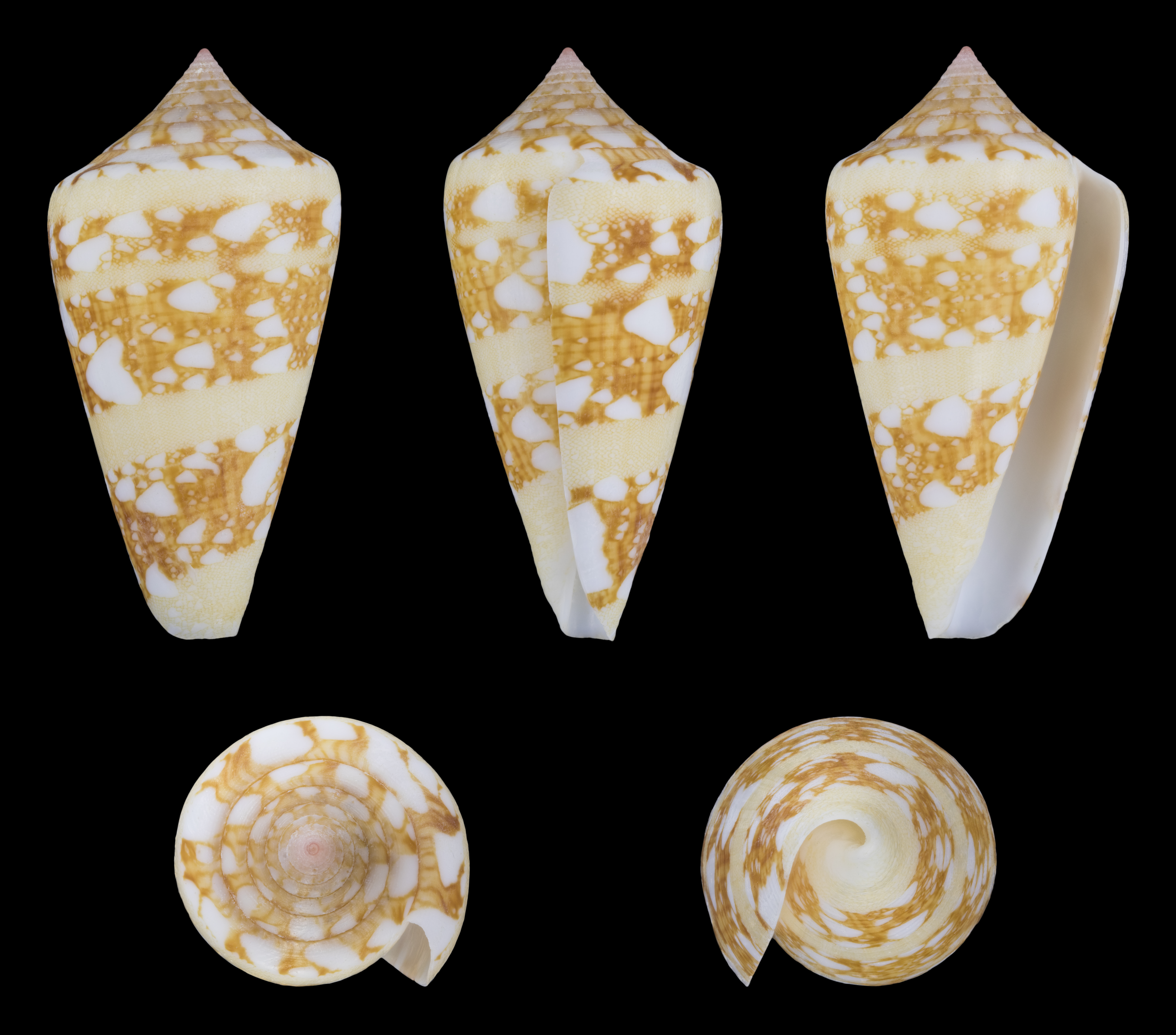
- A shell of Conus ammiralis Linnaeus, C., 1758

Conservation status
- Least Concern (IUCN 3.1)

Scientific classification
- Kingdom: Animalia
- Phylum: Mollusca
- Class: Gastropoda
- Subclass: Caenogastropoda
- Order: Neogastropoda
- Superfamily: Conoidea
- Family: Conidae
- Genus: Conus
- Species: C. ammiralis

Binomial name
- Conus ammiralis Linnaeus, 1758

Synonyms
- Conus (Cylinder) ammiralis Linnaeus, 1758 accepted, alternate representation; Conus ammiralis pseudocedonulli Blainville, 1818; Conus ammiralis var. archithalassus Hwass in Bruguière, 1792; Conus ammiralis var. australis Dautzenberg, 1937; Conus ammiralis var. coronatus Gmelin, 1791; Conus ammiralis var. crebrimaculata Dautzenberg, 1937; Conus ammiralis var. donovani Dautzenberg, 1937; Conus ammiralis var. extraordinarius Hwass in Bruguière, 1792; Conus ammiralis var. larvatus Gmelin, 1791; Conus ammiralis var. occidentalis Linnaeus, 1758; Conus ammiralis var. ordinarius Linnaeus, 1758; Conus ammiralis var. palinurus Hwass in Bruguière, 1792; Conus ammiralis var. personatus Hwass in Bruguière, 1792; Conus ammiralis var. polyzonus Hwass in Bruguière, 1792; Conus ammiralis var. summus Linnaeus, 1758; Conus ammiralis var. trifasciata Spalowsky, 1795; Conus architalassus Lightfoot, 1786; Conus blainvillii Vignard, 1829; Conus hereditarius da Motta, 1987; Conus textile var. abbreviata Dautzenberg, 1937; Conus vicarius Linnaeus, 1767; Conus vicarius Lamarck, 1810 (invalid: junior homonym of Conus vicarius Linnaeus, 1767; Conus textile var. abbreviata Dautzenberg, 1937, is a replacement name); Cucullus granulatus Röding, 1798; Cucullus imperialis Röding, 1798; Cucullus petreus Röding, 1798; Cucullus princeps Röding, 1798; Cucullus summus Röding, 1798; Leptoconus ammiralis Linnaeus, 1758; Leptoconus ammiralis temnes Iredale, 1930; Leptoconus temnes Iredale, 1930

= Conus ammiralis =

Species of sea snail

Conus ammiralis, common name the admiral cone, is a species of sea snail, a marine gastropod mollusk in the family Conidae, the cone snails and their allies.

Like all species within the genus Conus, these snails are predatory and venomous. They are capable of stinging humans, therefore live ones should be handled carefully or not at all.

== Description ==
The size of the shell varies between 35 mm and 109 mm. The color is the shell is chestnut with darker revolving lines, and upper, basal and one or two approximate bands, finely reticulated with yellow on a white ground. This pattern is overlaid with large, irregularly disposed triangular white spots.

== Distribution ==
This species occurs in the Red Sea and the Mascarenes; in the Indo-West Pacific off Fiji, Indo-China, Indo-Malaysia, the Marshall Islands, New Caledonia, the Solomon Islands, Thailand, Vanuatu and Australia (Northern Territory, Queensland, Western Australia)

== Gallery ==
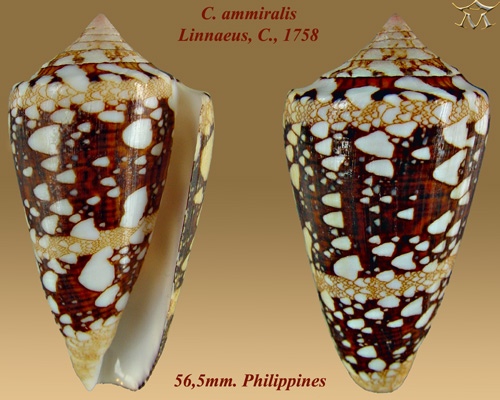
Conus ammiralis Linnaeus, C., 1758

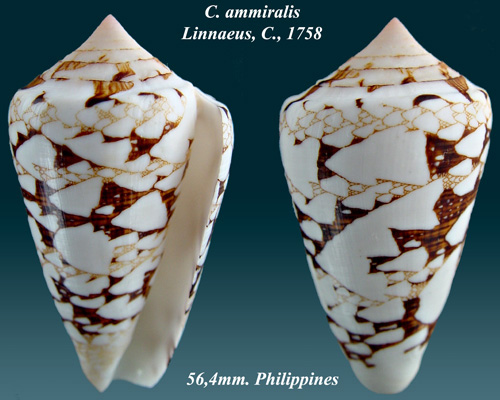
Conus ammiralis Linnaeus, C., 1758

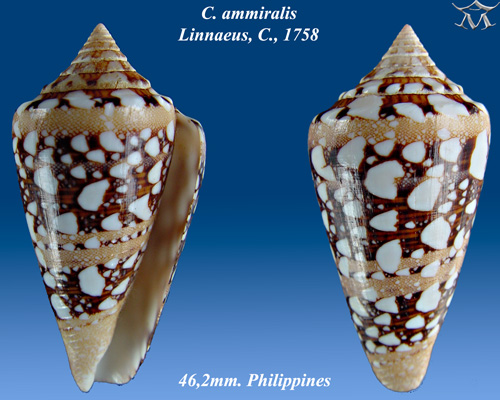
Conus ammiralis Linnaeus, C., 1758

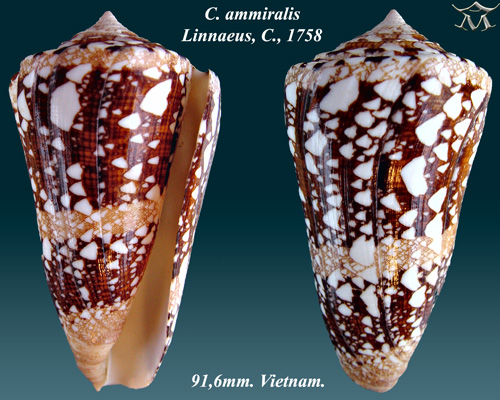
Conus ammiralis Linnaeus, C., 1758

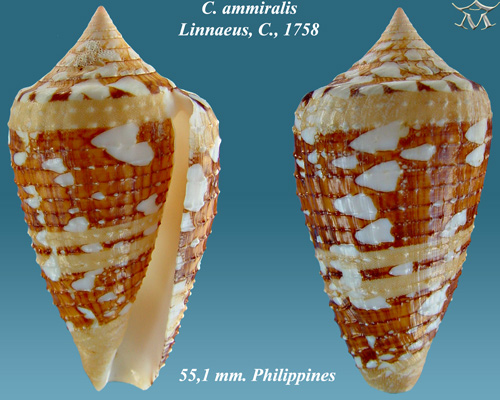
Conus ammiralis Linnaeus, C., 1758

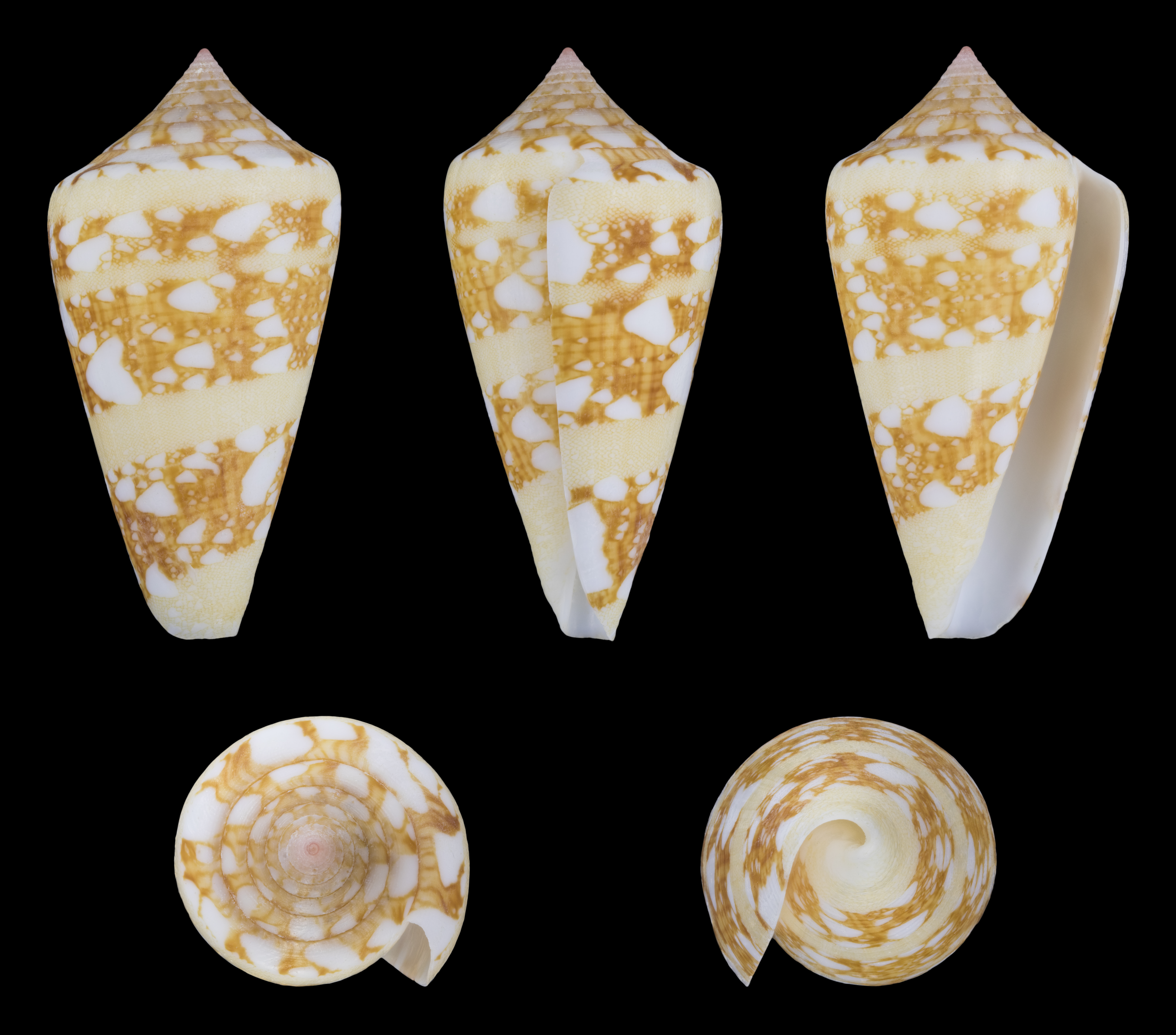
Conus ammiralis var. temnes Linnaeus, C., 1758

Conus ammiralis var. extraordinarius Hwass in Bruguière, 1792
