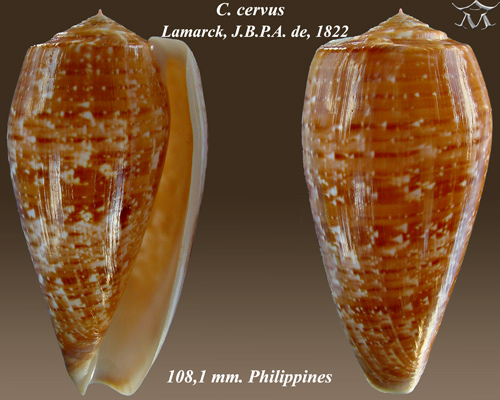
- Apertural and abapertural views of shell of Conus cervus Lamarck, J.B.P.A. de, 1822

Conservation status
- Least Concern (IUCN 3.1)

Scientific classification
- Kingdom: Animalia
- Phylum: Mollusca
- Class: Gastropoda
- Subclass: Caenogastropoda
- Order: Neogastropoda
- Superfamily: Conoidea
- Family: Conidae
- Genus: Conus
- Species: C. cervus

Binomial name
- Conus cervus Lamarck, 1822

Synonyms
- Conus (Textilia) cervus Lamarck, 1822 accepted, alternate representation; Textilia cervus (Lamarck, 1822)

= Conus cervus =

Species of sea snail

Conus cervus, common name the pallisade cone, is a species of sea snail, a marine gastropod mollusk in the family Conidae, the cone snails and their allies.

Like all species within the genus Conus, these snails are predatory and venomous. They are capable of stinging humans, therefore live ones should be handled carefully or not at all.

== Description ==
The size of the shell varies between 83 mm and 116 mm. The large, thin shell is cylindrically inflated. Its color is pale rosy yellow, encircled by lines and bands of chestnut and white spots, and hieroglyphic markings.

== Distribution ==
This marine species occurs off the Philippines and the Moluccas.
