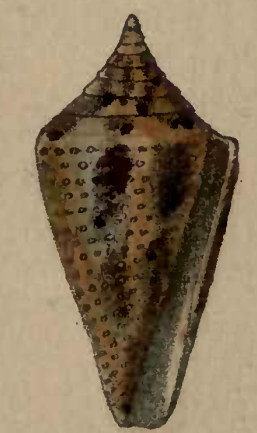
- Drawing with an apertural view of Conus granarius

Scientific classification
- Domain: Eukaryota
- Kingdom: Animalia
- Phylum: Mollusca
- Class: Gastropoda
- Subclass: Caenogastropoda
- Order: Neogastropoda
- Superfamily: Conoidea
- Family: Conidae
- Genus: Conus
- Species: C. granarius

Binomial name
- Conus granarius Kiener, 1847

Synonyms
- Conus (Stephanoconus) granarius Kiener, 1847 accepted, alternate representation; Conus catenatus G. B. Sowerby III, 1879 (invalid: junior homonym of Conus catenatus G. B. Sowerby I, 1850; C. desmotus is a replacement name); Conus desmotus Tomlin, 1937; Conus granarius panamicus Petuch, 1990; Conus interstinctus Guppy, R.J.L., 1866; Conus mappa granarius Kiener, 1847 (original description); Conus sanctaemarthae Vink, 1977; Tenorioconus granarius (Kiener, 1847); Tenorioconus panamicus (Petuch, 1990)

= Conus granarius =

Species of sea snail

Conus granarius is a species of sea snail, a marine gastropod mollusk in the family Conidae, the cone snails, cone shells or cones.

These snails are predatory and venomous. They are capable of stinging humans.

== Description ==
The size of the shell varies between 23 mm and 71 mm. The spire is concavely elevated and not coronated. The body whorl is smooth and slightly striate below. It is irregularly marbled with chestnut and white, with equidistant chestnut revolving lines bearing white spots that are granularly elevated.

== Distribution ==
This marine species of cone snail occurs in the Caribbean Sea from Panama to Venezuela; off the Caribbean islands Curaçao, Aruba and Bonaire.
