= Conus chiapponorum =

Conservation status
- Data Deficient (IUCN 3.1)

Scientific classification
- Kingdom: Animalia
- Phylum: Mollusca
- Class: Gastropoda
- Subclass: Caenogastropoda
- Order: Neogastropoda
- Superfamily: Conoidea
- Family: Conidae
- Genus: Conus
- Species: C. chiapponorum

Binomial name
- Conus chiapponorum Lorenz, 2004

Synonyms
- Conus (Textilia) chiapponorum Lorenz, 2004 accepted, alternate representation; Conus (Textilia) lucasi (Bozzetti, 2010); Conus lucasi (Bozzetti, 2010); Textilia chiapponorum (Lorenz, 2004); Textilia lucasi Bozzetti, 2010; Textilia lucasi f. albina Bozzetti, 2011 (unavailable infrasubspecific name)

Species of sea snail

Conus chiapponorum is a species of sea snail, a marine gastropod mollusk in the family Conidae, the cone snails and their allies.

Like all species within the genus Conus, these snails are predatory and venomous. They are capable of stinging humans, therefore live ones should be handled carefully or not at all.

== Description ==
The size of the shell varies between 18 mm and 60 mm.

== Distribution ==
This marine species occurs off Southern Madagascar.
