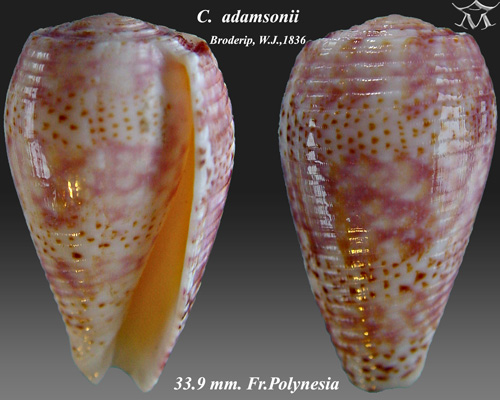
- Apertural and abapertural views of shell of Conus adamsonii Broderip, W.J., 1836
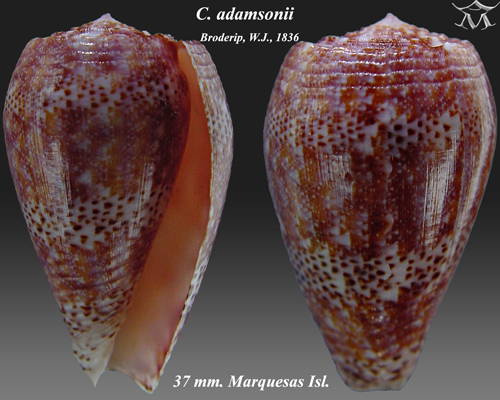

Conservation status
- Least Concern (IUCN 3.1)

Scientific classification
- Kingdom: Animalia
- Phylum: Mollusca
- Class: Gastropoda
- Subclass: Caenogastropoda
- Order: Neogastropoda
- Superfamily: Conoidea
- Family: Conidae
- Genus: Conus
- Species: C. adamsonii

Binomial name
- Conus adamsonii Broderip, 1836

Synonyms
- Conus cingulatus G. B. Sowerby I, 1825; Conus rhododendron Jay, 1839; Conus (Textilia) adamsonii Broderip, 1836; Textilia adamsonii (Broderip, 1836) · accepted, alternate representation

= Conus adamsonii =

Species of sea snail

Conus adamsonii, common name the rhododendron cone, is a species of sea snail, a marine gastropod mollusk in the family Conidae, the cone snails and their allies.

Like all species within the genus Conus, these snails are predatory and venomous. They are capable of stinging humans, therefore live ones should be handled carefully or not at all.

The species was described from a specimen in the collection of John Adamson.

== Description ==
The size of the shell varies between 26.4 mm and 56 mm. The spire is depressed, channeled and striate. The body whorl is grooved above and below, smooth in the middle. The color of the shell is rosy white, with numerous small triangular chestnut spots and three bands of violaceous and chestnut clouds and reticulations.

== Distribution ==
This marine species occurs off the Marquesas Islands.
