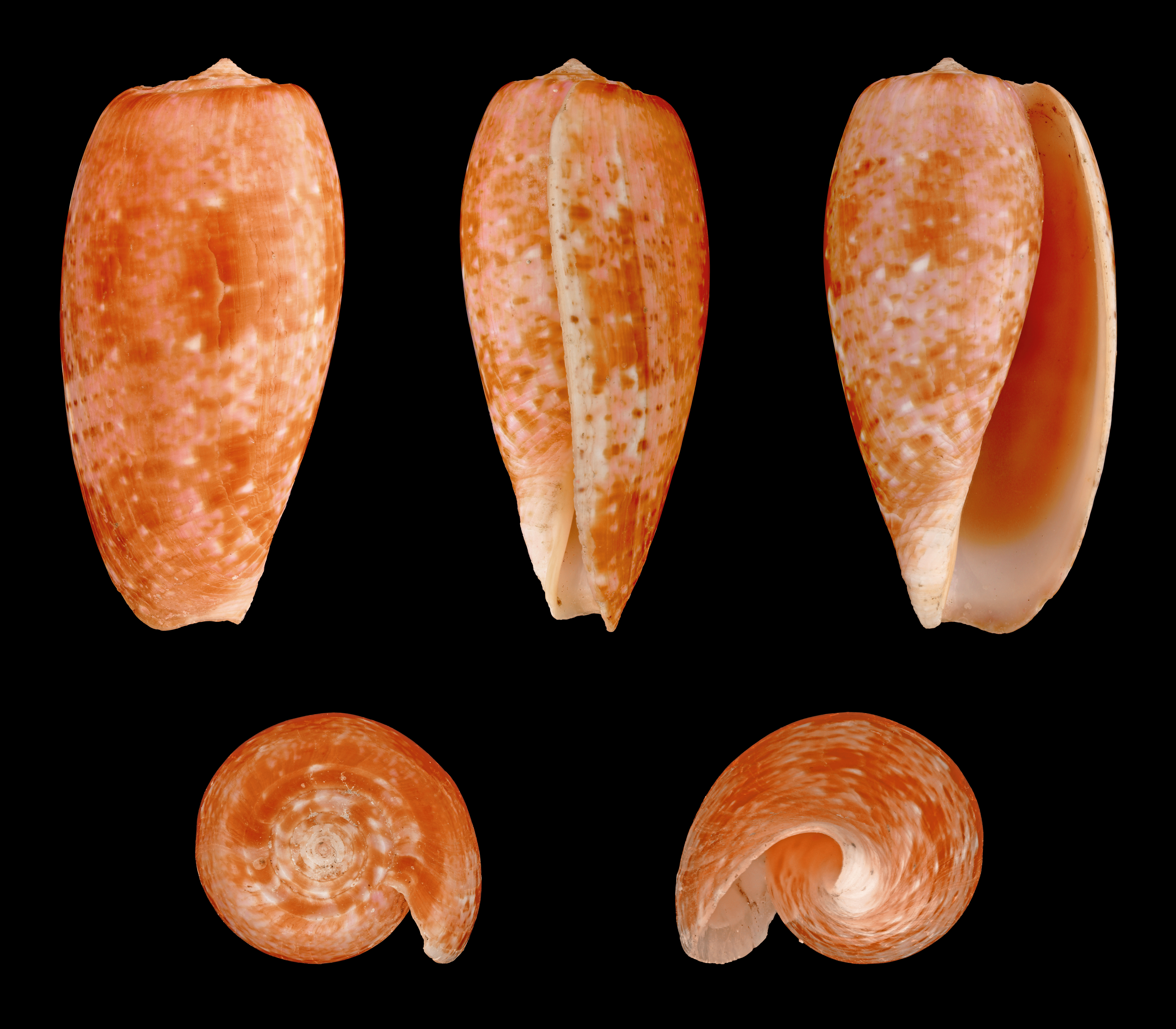
- Five views of a shell of Conus bullatus

Conservation status
- Least Concern (IUCN 3.1)

Scientific classification
- Kingdom: Animalia
- Phylum: Mollusca
- Class: Gastropoda
- Subclass: Caenogastropoda
- Order: Neogastropoda
- Superfamily: Conoidea
- Family: Conidae
- Genus: Conus
- Species: C. bullatus

Binomial name
- Conus bullatus Linnaeus, 1758

Synonyms
- Conus (Textilia) bullatus Linnaeus, 1758 accepted, alternate representation; Conus bullatus pongo Coomans, Moolenbeek & Wils, 1982; Conus bullatus var. articulata Dautzenberg, 1937; Conus laganum Röding, P.F., 1798; Conus nubecula Gmelin, 1791; Cucullus laganum Röding, 1798; Cucullus parvus Röding, 1798; Textilia bullata (Linnaeus, 1758); Textilia bullata f. pongo Shikama, 1977 (not available: established at infrasubspecific rank)

= Conus bullatus =

Species of sea snail

Conus bullatus, common name the bubble cone, is a species of sea snail, a marine gastropod mollusk in the family Conidae, the cone snails and their allies.

Like all species within the genus Conus, these snails are predatory and venomous. They are capable of stinging humans, therefore live ones should be handled carefully or not at all.

== Description ==
The size of an adult shell varies between 42 mm and 82 mm. The thin shell is inflated and grooved below. The color of the shell is white, clouded with orange-red and chestnut, forming two ill-defined bands, with indistinct revolving rows of white and chestnut articulations. The aperture is pink.

== Distribution ==
This species occurs in the Indian Ocean off the Mascarene Basin and Mauritius; in the Indo-West Pacific (the Philippines, New Caledonia)

== Gallery ==
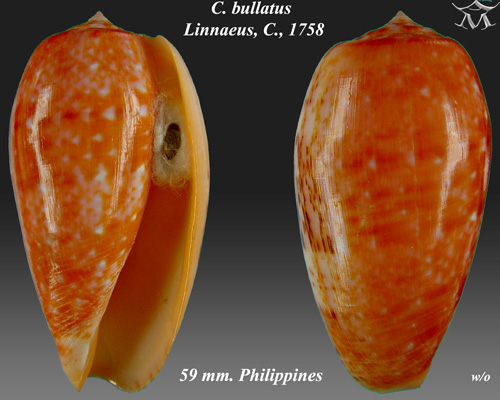
Conus bullatus Linnaeus, C., 1758

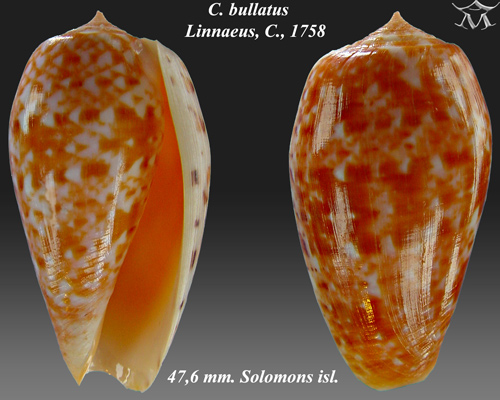
Conus bullatus Linnaeus, C., 1758

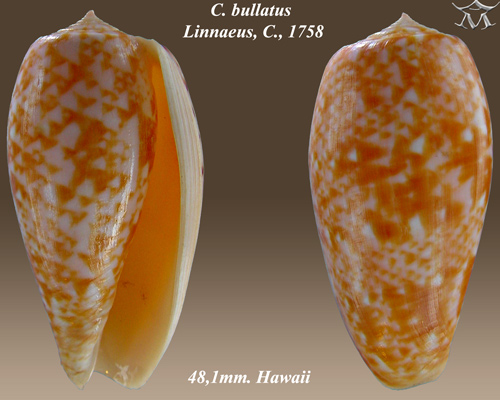
Conus bullatus Linnaeus, C., 1758

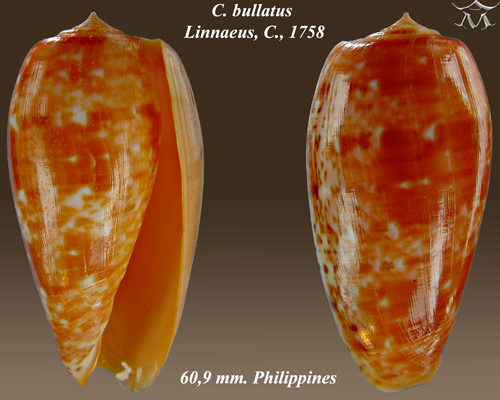
Conus bullatus Linnaeus, C., 1758

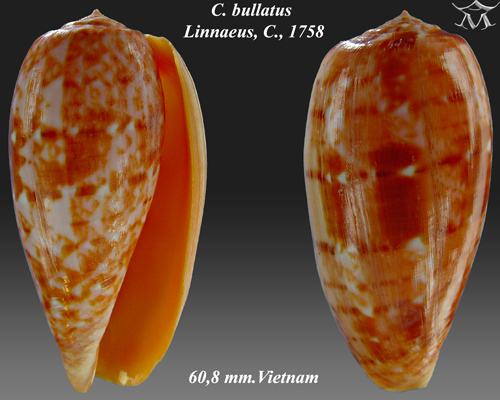
Conus bullatus Linnaeus, C., 1758
