= Conus hamanni =

Scientific classification
- Kingdom: Animalia
- Phylum: Mollusca
- Class: Gastropoda
- Subclass: Caenogastropoda
- Order: Neogastropoda
- Superfamily: Conoidea
- Family: Conidae
- Genus: Conus
- Species: C. hamanni

Binomial name
- Conus hamanni Fainzilber & Mienis, 1986

Synonyms
- Conus (Leptoconus) hamanni Fainzilber & Mienis, 1986 · accepted, alternate representation; Leptoconus hamanni (Fainzilber & Mienis, 1986)

Species of sea snail

Conus hamanni is a species of sea snail, a marine gastropod mollusk in the family Conidae, the cone snails and their allies.

Like all species within the genus Conus, these snails are predatory and venomous. They are capable of stinging humans if handled.

== Description ==
The size of the shell varies between 18 mm and 30 mm.

== Distribution ==
This species occurs in the Red Sea.
