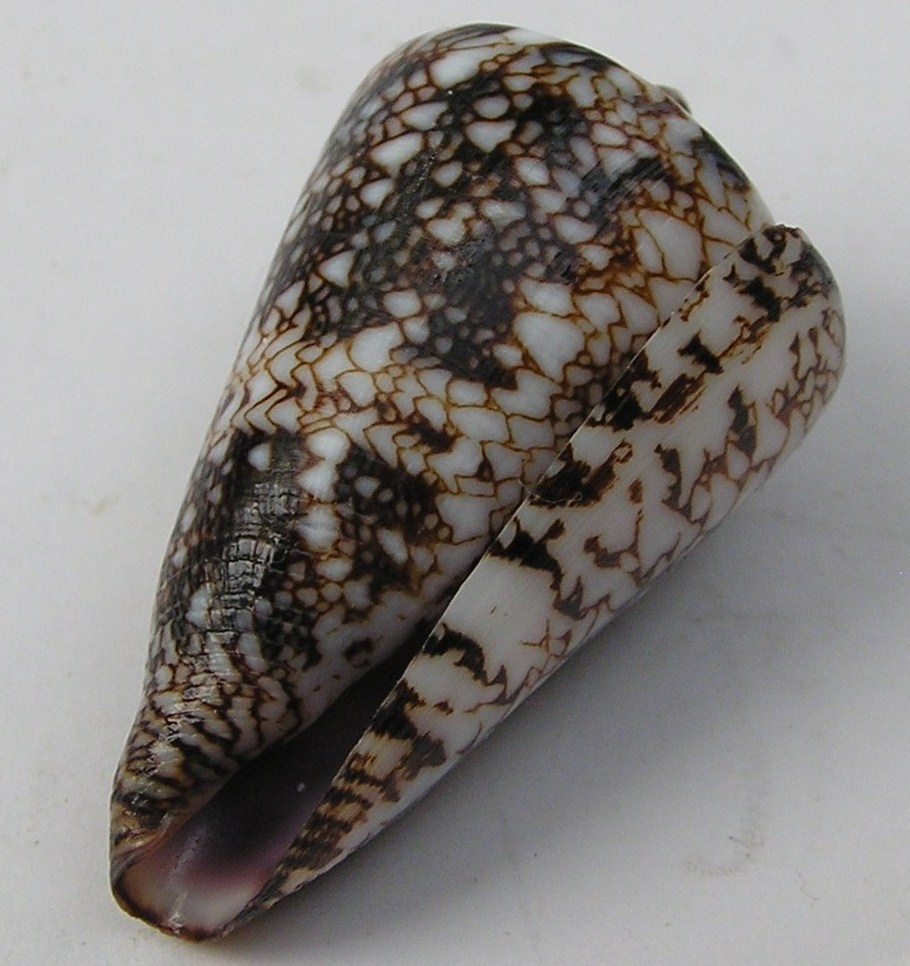
- Apertural view of Conus locumtenens

Conservation status
- Least Concern (IUCN 3.1)

Scientific classification
- Domain: Eukaryota
- Kingdom: Animalia
- Phylum: Mollusca
- Class: Gastropoda
- Subclass: Caenogastropoda
- Order: Neogastropoda
- Superfamily: Conoidea
- Family: Conidae
- Genus: Conus
- Species: C. locumtenens

Binomial name
- Conus locumtenens Blumenbach, 1791

Synonyms
- Conus (Leptoconus) locumtenens Blumenbach, 1791 · accepted, alternate representation; Conus acuminatus Hwass in Bruguière, 1792; Conus coxianus G. B. Sowerby III, 1895; Conus insignis G. B. Sowerby II, 1833; Conus multicatenatus G. B. Sowerby II, 1865; Conus schech Weinkauff, 1873; Conus substitutus Link, 1807; Conus viaderi Fenaux, 1942; Conus vicarius Röding, 1798; Cucullus vicarius Röding, 1798; Leptoconus locumtenens (Blumenbach, 1791)

= Conus locumtenens =

Species of sea snail

Conus locumtenens, common name the vice admiral cone, is a species of sea snail, a marine gastropod mollusk in the family Conidae, the cone snails and their allies.

Like all species within the genus Conus, these snails are predatory and venomous. They are capable of stinging humans, therefore live ones should be handled carefully or not at all.

Subspecies

- Conus locumtenens assilorenzoi (Cossignani & Assi, 2016)
- Conus locumtenens biggii (Cossignani & Assi, 2016)
- Conus locumtenens linae (Cossignani & Assi, 2016)
- Conus locumtenens locumtenens Blumenbach, 1791

== Description ==
The size of an adult shell varies between 30 mm and 66 mm. The spire is channeled and concavely elevated. The color of the shell is yellowish or pink-white, with a network of chestnut or chocolate. It is sometimes indistinctly banded, with lines of spots on the bands. The aperture is generally rose-tinted.

== Distribution ==
This species occurs in the Red Sea, the Gulf of Aden and in the Indian Ocean off Somalia.

== Gallery ==
Below are several color forms:

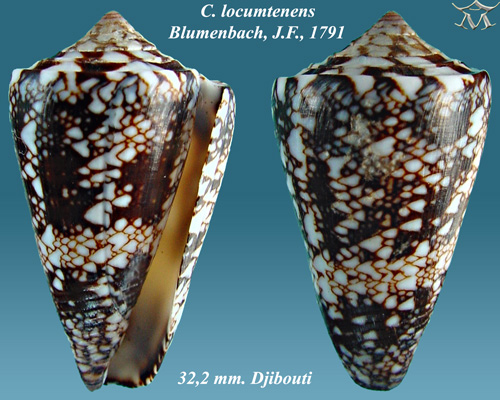
Conus locumtenens Blumenbach, J.F., 1791

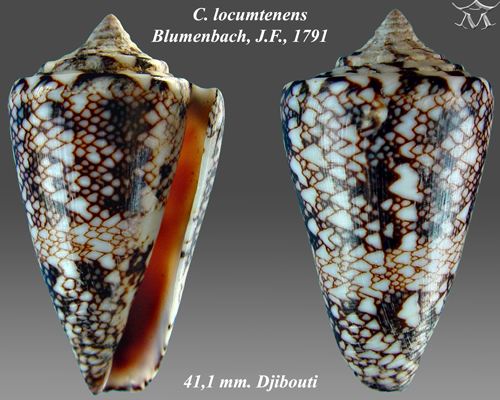
Conus locumtenens Blumenbach, J.F., 1791

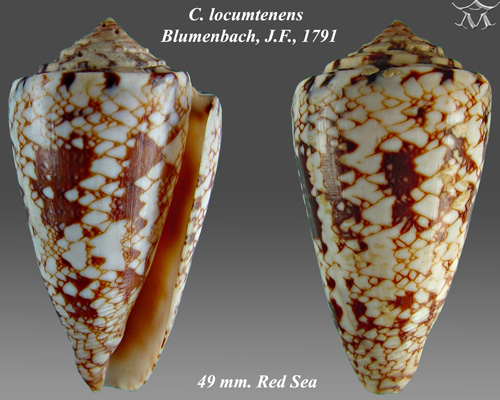
Conus locumtenens Blumenbach, J.F., 1791

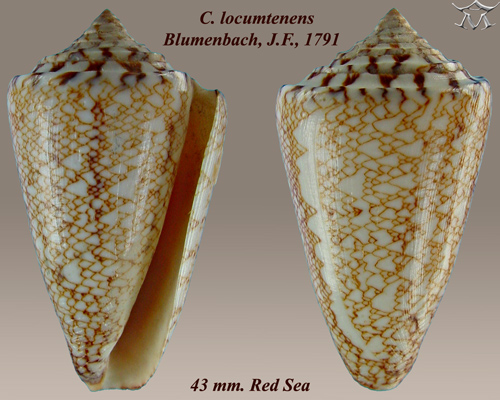
Conus locumtenens Blumenbach, J.F., 1791
