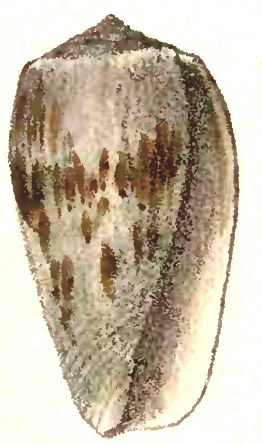
- Drawing of a shell of Conus julii

Conservation status
- Vulnerable (IUCN 3.1)

Scientific classification
- Kingdom: Animalia
- Phylum: Mollusca
- Class: Gastropoda
- Subclass: Caenogastropoda
- Order: Neogastropoda
- Superfamily: Conoidea
- Family: Conidae
- Genus: Conus
- Species: C. julii

Binomial name
- Conus julii Liénard É., 1870

Synonyms
- Conus (Textilia) julii Liénard É., 1870 · accepted, alternate representation; Textilia julii (Liénard É., 1870)

= Conus julii =

Species of sea snail

Conus julii is a species of sea snail, a marine gastropod mollusk in the family Conidae, the cone snails and their allies.

Like all species within the genus Conus, these snails are predatory and venomous. They are capable of stinging humans, therefore live ones should be handled carefully or not at all.

== Description ==
The size of the shell varies between 32 mm and 62 mm. The shell is white. The upper part of body whorl, spire and interior are tinged with pink. The body whorl also shows longitudinal chestnut striations, forming two irregular bands.

== Distribution ==
This species occurs in the Indian Ocean off Mauritius and the Mascarene Basin.
