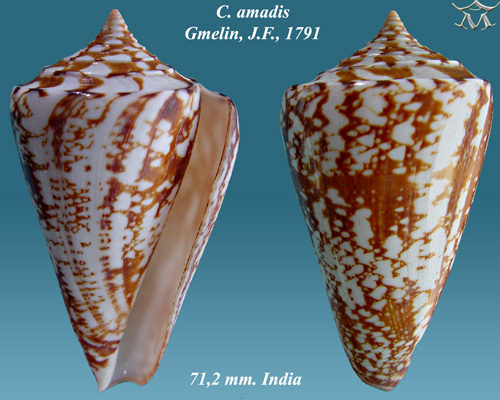
- Apertural and abapertural views of shell of Conus amadis Gmelin, J.F., 1791

Conservation status
- Least Concern (IUCN 3.1)

Scientific classification
- Kingdom: Animalia
- Phylum: Mollusca
- Class: Gastropoda
- Subclass: Caenogastropoda
- Order: Neogastropoda
- Superfamily: Conoidea
- Family: Conidae
- Genus: Conus
- Species: C. amadis

Binomial name
- Conus amadis Gmelin, 1791

Synonyms
- Conus (Leptoconus) amadis Gmelin, 1791 · accepted, alternate representation; Conus amadis var. aurantia Dautzenberg, 1937 (invalid: junior homonym of Conus aurantius Hwass in Bruguière, 1792); Conus amadis var. castaneofasciata Dautzenberg, 1937; Conus arbornatalis da Motta, 1978; Conus subacutus Fenaux, 1942; Cucullus venustus Röding, 1798; Leptoconus amadis var. castaneofasciatus Dautzenberg, 1937; Leptoconus arbornatalis da Motta, 1978; Leptoconus subacutus Fenaux, 1942

= Conus amadis =

Species of sea snail

Conus amadis, common name: the Amadis cone, is a species of predatory sea snail, a marine gastropod mollusk in the family Conidae, the cone snails or cones.

Like all species within the genus Conus, these snails are predatory and venomous. They are capable of stinging humans, therefore live ones should be handled carefully or not at all.

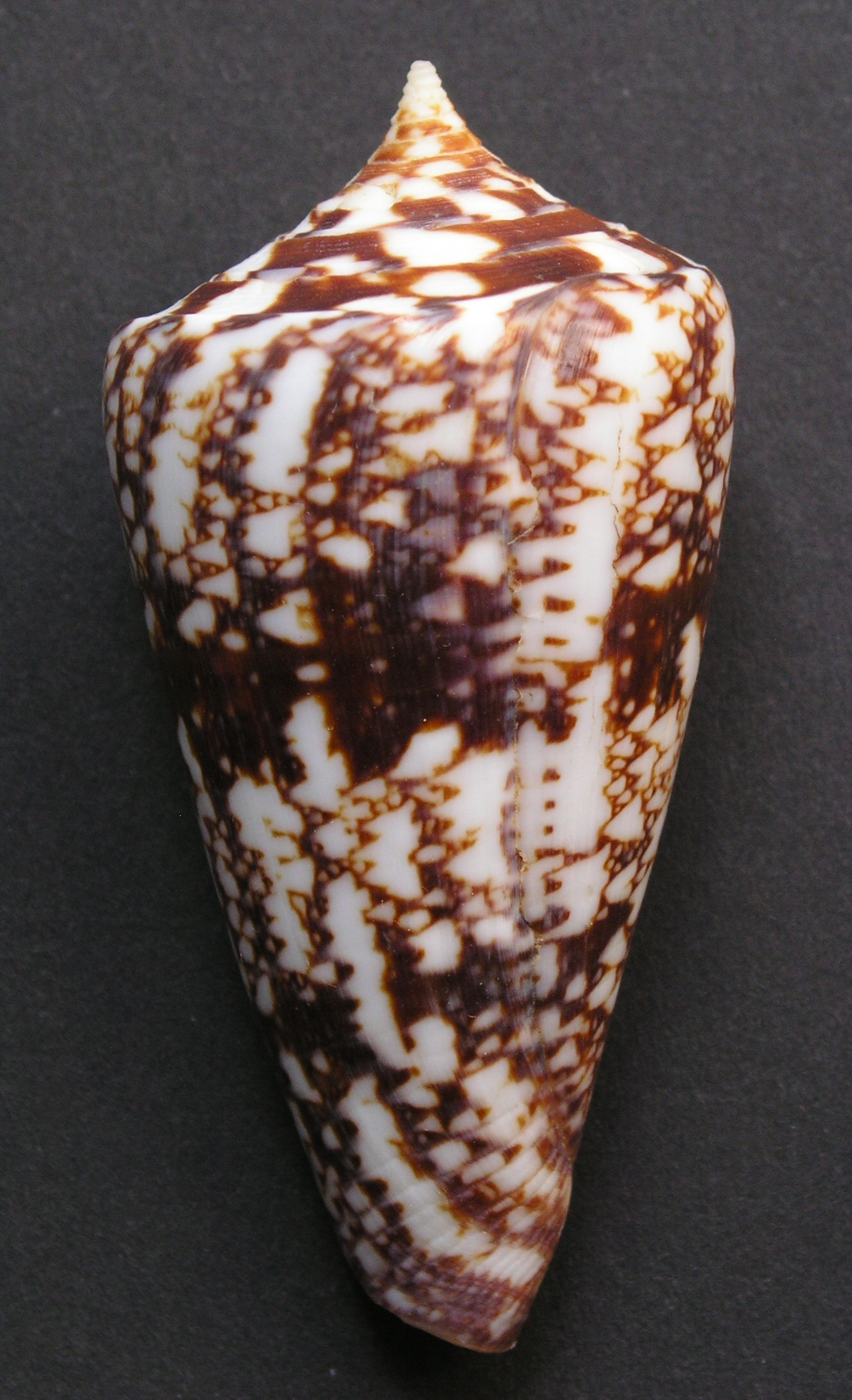
A shell of Conus amadis Gmelin, 1791

== Description ==
The size of an adult shell varies between 40 mm and 110 mm. The spire is striate, channeled, concavely elevated, sharp-pointed. It has a sharp shoulder angle. The lower part of body whorl is punctured and grooved The color of the shell is orange-brown to chocolate, thickly covered with large and small subtriangular white spots, which by their varied disposition sometimes form a white central band, or dark bands above and below the center, the latter occasionally bearing articulated revolving lines.

== Distribution ==
This marine species occurs in the Mascarene Basin, in the Indian Ocean, and in the Pacific Ocean along Indonesia, New Caledonia, and Polynesia.

== Gallery ==
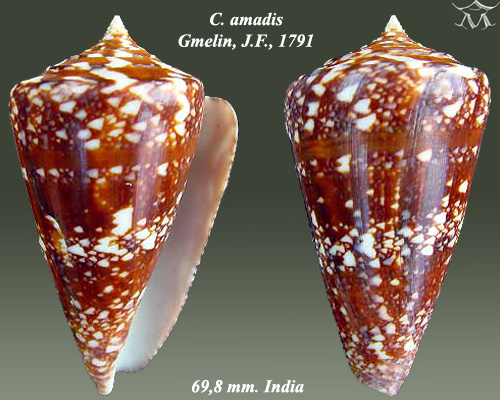
Conus amadis Gmelin, J.F., 1791

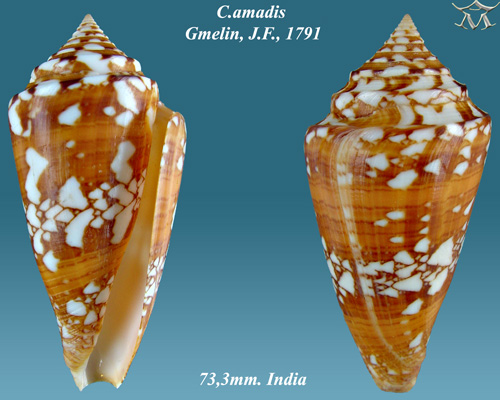
Conus amadis Gmelin, J.F., 1791

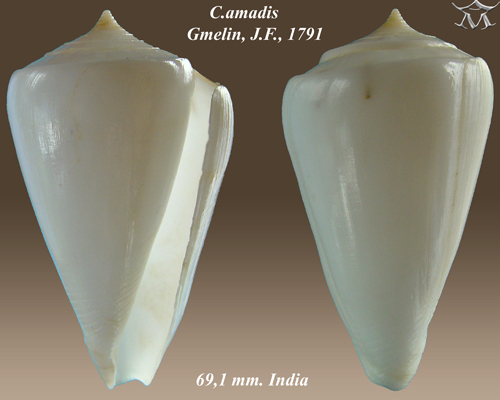
Conus amadis Gmelin, J.F., 1791
