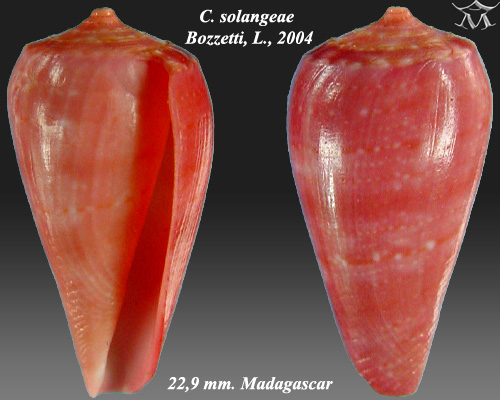
- Apertural and abapertural views of shell of Conus solangeae Bozzetti, L., 2004

Scientific classification
- Kingdom: Animalia
- Phylum: Mollusca
- Class: Gastropoda
- Subclass: Caenogastropoda
- Order: Neogastropoda
- Superfamily: Conoidea
- Family: Conidae
- Genus: Conus
- Species: C. solangeae

Binomial name
- Conus solangeae Bozzetti, 2004

Synonyms
- Conus (Textilia) solangeae Bozzetti, 2004 · accepted, alternate representation; Textilia solangeae (Bozzetti, 2004)

= Conus solangeae =

Species of sea snail

Conus solangeae is a species of sea snail, a marine gastropod mollusk in the family Conidae, the cone snails and their allies.

Like all species within the genus Conus, these snails are predatory and venomous. They are capable of stinging humans, therefore live ones should be handled carefully or not at all.

== Description ==
The size of the shell varies between 20 mm and 28 mm.

== Distribution ==
This marine species occurs off Madagascar.
