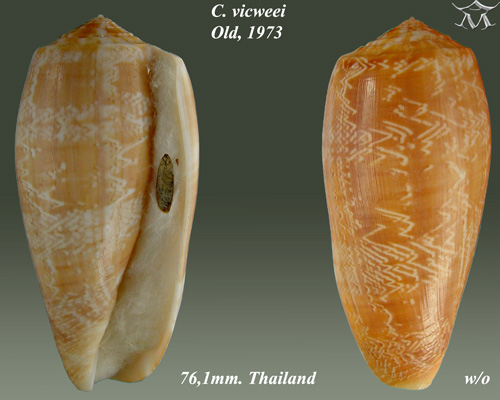
- Apertural and abapertural views of shell
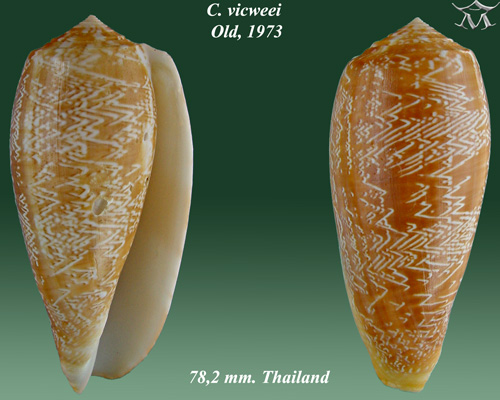

Conservation status
- Least Concern (IUCN 3.1)

Scientific classification
- Kingdom: Animalia
- Phylum: Mollusca
- Class: Gastropoda
- Subclass: Caenogastropoda
- Order: Neogastropoda
- Superfamily: Conoidea
- Family: Conidae
- Genus: Conus
- Species: C. vicweei

Binomial name
- Conus vicweei Old, 1973

Synonyms
- Conus (Textilia) vicweei (Old, 1973) · accepted, alternate representation; Textilia vicweei (Old, 1973)

= Conus vicweei =

Species of sea snail

Conus vicweei, common name the Vic Wee's cone, is a species of sea snail, a marine gastropod mollusk in the family Conidae, the cone snails and their allies.

Like all species within the genus Conus, these snails are predatory and venomous. They are capable of stinging humans, therefore live ones should be handled carefully or not at all.

== Description ==
The size of the shell varies between 60 millimetres (2.4 in) and 91 millimetres (3.6 in). The colour is referred to as violet brown, with white to cream zigzag shaped lines reducing towards the lip and on the ventral side.

== Distribution ==
This marine species occurs off Burma, in the Strait of Malacca, off India in the Lakshadweep Sea, and off Indonesia. It is a deep water species that occurs at depths of 70 metres (230 ft) to 200 metres (660 ft).
