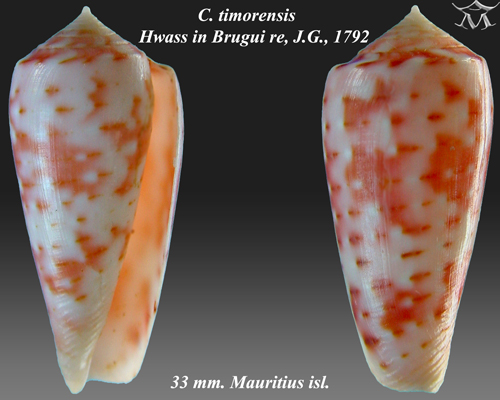
- Apertural and abapertural views of shell of Conus timorensis Hwass in Bruguiиre, J.G., 1792
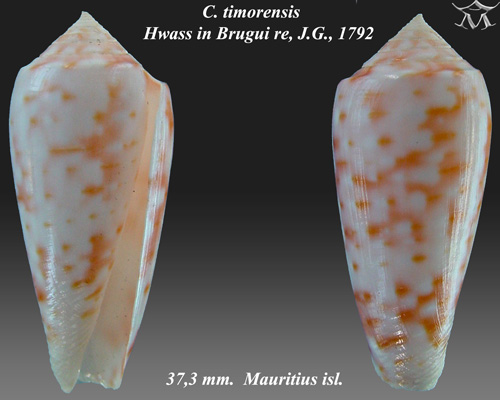

Conservation status
- Least Concern (IUCN 3.1)

Scientific classification
- Kingdom: Animalia
- Phylum: Mollusca
- Class: Gastropoda
- Subclass: Caenogastropoda
- Order: Neogastropoda
- Superfamily: Conoidea
- Family: Conidae
- Genus: Conus
- Species: C. timorensis

Binomial name
- Conus timorensis Hwass in Bruguière, 1792

Synonyms
- Conus (Textilia) timorensis Hwass in Bruguière, 1792 · accepted, alternate representation; Conus euschemon Tomlin, 1937; Conus gracilis Wood, 1828 (invalid: junior homonym of Conus gracilis G.B. Sowerby I, 1823; C. euschemon is a replacement name); Conus vespertinus G. B. Sowerby I, 1825; Textilia timorensis (Hwass in Bruguière, 1792)

= Conus timorensis =

Species of sea snail

Conus timorensis, common name the Timor cone, is a species of sea snail, a marine gastropod mollusk in the family Conidae, the cone snails and their allies.

Like all species within the genus Conus, these snails are predatory and venomous. They are capable of stinging humans, therefore live ones should be handled carefully or not at all.

== Description ==
The size of the shell varies between 13 mm and 50 mm. The smooth shell is striate towards the base. Its color is rosy white, with orange-rose clouds and distant revolving series of spots.

== Distribution ==
This species occurs in the Indian Ocean off the Mascarenes; also off Timor, Flores and New Guinea.
