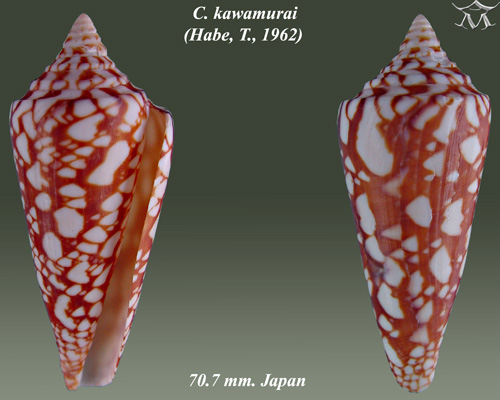
- Apertural and abapertural views of shell of Conus aratispira

Scientific classification
- Kingdom: Animalia
- Phylum: Mollusca
- Class: Gastropoda
- Subclass: Caenogastropoda
- Order: Neogastropoda
- Superfamily: Conoidea
- Family: Conidae
- Genus: Conus
- Species: C. aratispira

Binomial name
- Conus aratispira Pilsbry, 1905

Synonyms
- Conus (Cylinder) aratispira Pilsbry, 1905 alternative representation; Conus (Cylinder) kawamurai T. Habe, 1962; Conus (Leptoconus) kawamurai T. Habe, 1962; Conus kawamurai T. Habe, 1962 · unaccepted > junior subjective synonym; Leptoconus kawamurai (T. Habe, 1962) superseded combination

= Conus aratispira =

Species of sea snail

Conus aratispira is a species of sea snail, a marine gastropod mollusk in the family Conidae, the cone snails and their allies.

Like all species within the genus Conus, these snails are predatory and venomous. They are capable of stinging humans, therefore live ones should be handled carefully or not at all.

== Distribution ==
This marine species occurs off the Ryukyus, Japan, and off Okinawa Islands.

== Description ==
The size of the shell varies between 35 mm and 81 mm.

(Original description) The shell is slender and long, with a high, turreted, biconic spire. The conical portion of the spire constitutes about one third of the total length and is somewhat terraced. The whorls are angular in the middle, smooth below the angle, and steeply sloping above it, where they are marked by four or five spiral grooves. In well-preserved specimens, the shoulder of the intermediate whorls is very weakly tuberculate.

The body whorl is obliquely striate towards the base. Below, the grooves and convex intervals are of equal size; upwards, however, they become more widely spaced, with broad, flat intervals. The aperture is narrow, and its length is about three quarters that of the shell.
