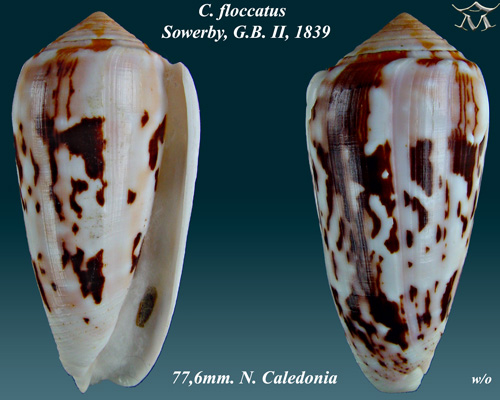
- Apertural and abapertural views of shell of Conus floccatus Sowerby, G.B. I, 1839

Conservation status
- Least Concern (IUCN 3.1)

Scientific classification
- Kingdom: Animalia
- Phylum: Mollusca
- Class: Gastropoda
- Subclass: Caenogastropoda
- Order: Neogastropoda
- Superfamily: Conoidea
- Family: Conidae
- Genus: Conus
- Species: C. floccatus

Binomial name
- Conus floccatus G. B. Sowerby I, 1841

Synonyms
- Conus (Pionoconus) floccatus G. B. Sowerby I, 1841 · accepted, alternate representation; Conus circumsignatus Crosse, 1865; Conus magdalenae Kiener, 1845; Textilia floccata (G. B. Sowerby I, 1841)

= Conus floccatus =

Species of sea snail

Conus floccatus, common name the snowflake cone, is a species of sea snail, a marine gastropod mollusk in the family Conidae, the cone snails and their allies.

Like all species within the genus Conus, these snails are predatory and venomous. They are capable of stinging humans, therefore live ones should be handled carefully or not at all.

== Description ==
The size of the shell varies between 35 mm and 86 mm. The solid shell has an oblong, subcylindrical shape. It is granosely silicate below. Its color is light purplish, with longitudinal flames and revolving bands of chestnut, and lines of angulate white spots.

== Distribution ==
This marine species occurs off New Caledonia, Vanuatu, the Solomon Islands, the Samoan Islands, the Marshall Islands, Indonesia, the Philippines and Australia (Queensland).

== Gallery ==
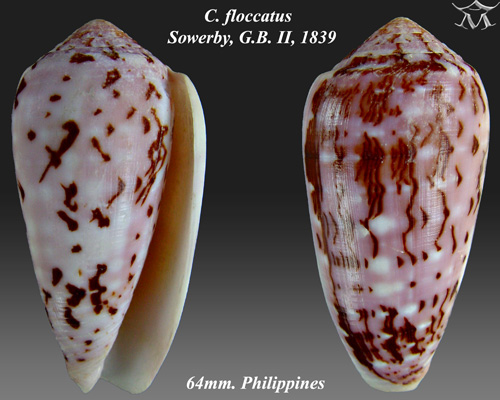
Conus floccatus Sowerby, G.B.I, 1841

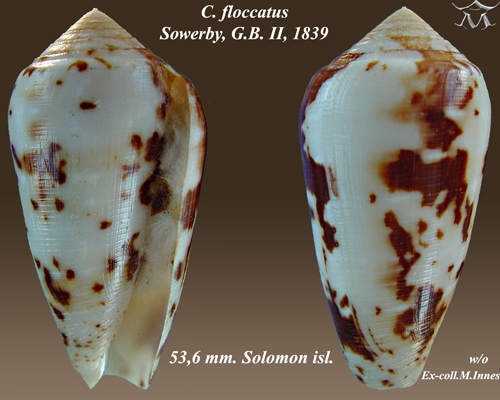
Conus floccatus Sowerby, G.B. I, 1841

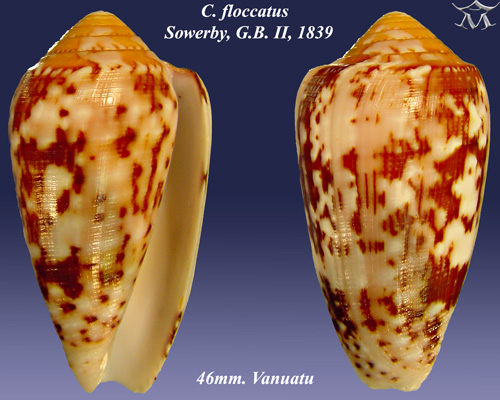
Conus floccatus Sowerby, G.B. I, 1841
