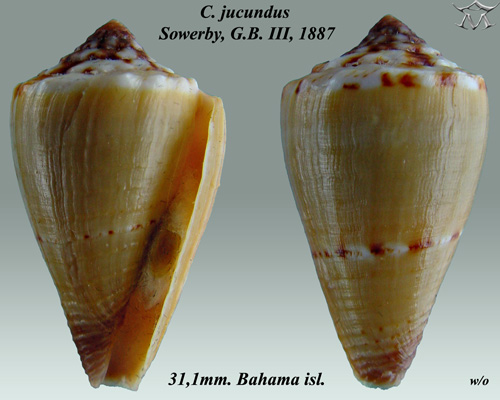
- Apertural and abapertural views of shell of Conus jucundus Sowerby, G.B. III, 1887
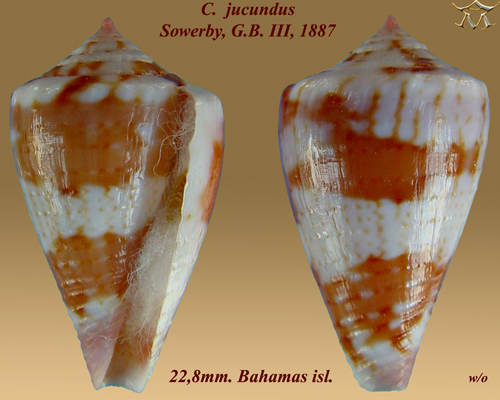

Conservation status
- Least Concern (IUCN 3.1)

Scientific classification
- Kingdom: Animalia
- Phylum: Mollusca
- Class: Gastropoda
- Subclass: Caenogastropoda
- Order: Neogastropoda
- Superfamily: Conoidea
- Family: Conidae
- Genus: Conus
- Species: C. jucundus

Binomial name
- Conus jucundus G. B. Sowerby III, 1887

Synonyms
- Conus (Dauciconus) jucundus G. B. Sowerby III, 1887 · accepted, alternate representation; Conus regius abbotti Clench, 1942; Leptoconus abbotti (Clench, 1942); Purpuriconus jucundus (G.B. Sowerby III, 1887)

= Conus jucundus =

Species of sea snail

Conus jucundus, common name Abbott's cone, is a species of sea snail, a marine gastropod mollusk in the family Conidae, the cone snails and their allies.

Like all species within the genus Conus, these snails are predatory and venomous. They are capable of stinging humans, therefore live ones should be handled carefully or not at all.

== Distribution ==
This marine species occurs off the Bahamas.

== Description ==
The maximum recorded shell length is 43 mm.

== Habitat ==
Minimum recorded depth is 0.3 m. Maximum recorded depth is 0.3 m.
