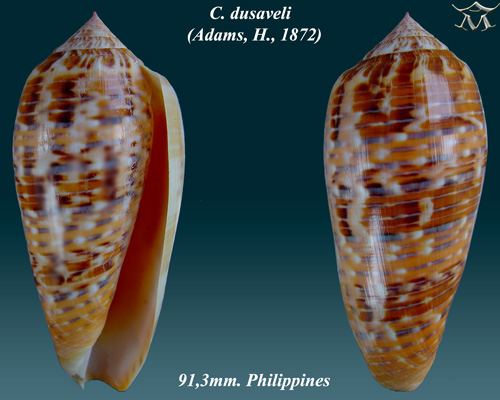
- Apertural and abapertural views of shell of Conus dusaveli (Adams, H., 1872)

Conservation status
- Least Concern (IUCN 3.1)

Scientific classification
- Kingdom: Animalia
- Phylum: Mollusca
- Class: Gastropoda
- Subclass: Caenogastropoda
- Order: Neogastropoda
- Superfamily: Conoidea
- Family: Conidae
- Genus: Conus
- Species: C. dusaveli

Binomial name
- Conus dusaveli (H. Adams, 1872)

Synonyms
- Conus (textilia) dusaveli (H. Adams, 1872); Leptoconus dusaveli H. Adams, 1872; Textilia benten Shikama, 1977; Textilia dusaveli (H. Adams, 1872); Textilia dusaveli benten Shikama, T. & Oishi in Shikama, T., 1977

= Conus dusaveli =

Species of sea snail

Conus dusaveli, common name Du Savel's cone, is a species of sea snail, a marine gastropod mollusk in the family Conidae, the cone snails and their allies.

Like all species within the genus Conus, these snails are predatory and venomous. They are capable of stinging humans, therefore live ones should be handled carefully or not at all.

== Description ==
The size of the shell varies between 50 mm and 93 mm. The thin shell is striated throughout. Its color is yellowish or violaceous white. It is clouded.with chestnut, with distant revolving series of chestnut spots and short lines, most conspicuous on two irregular lighter bands.

== Distribution ==
This marine species occurs off the Ryukyus, Japan and the Philippines.

== Gallery ==
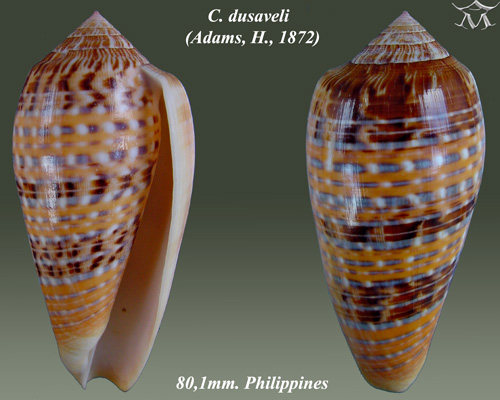
Conus dusaveli (Adams, H., 1872)

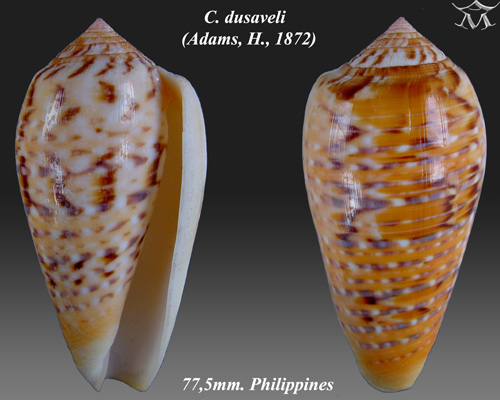
Conus dusaveli (Adams, H., 1872)

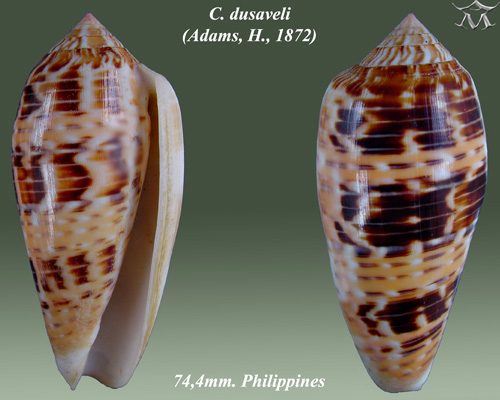
Conus dusaveli (Adams, H., 1872)

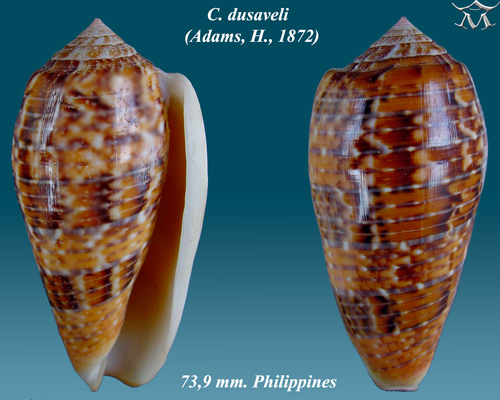
Conus dusaveli (Adams, H., 1872)
