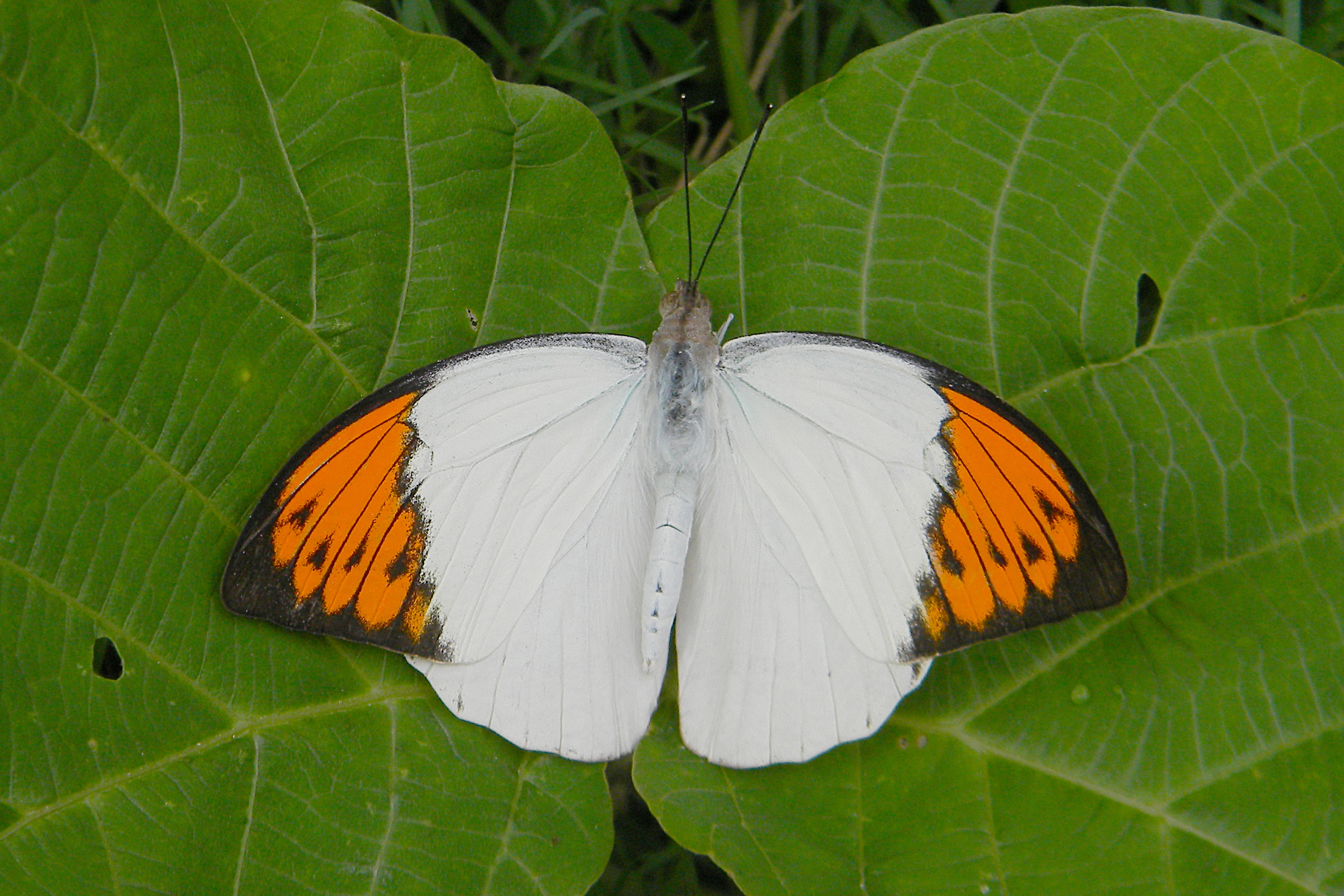
- India
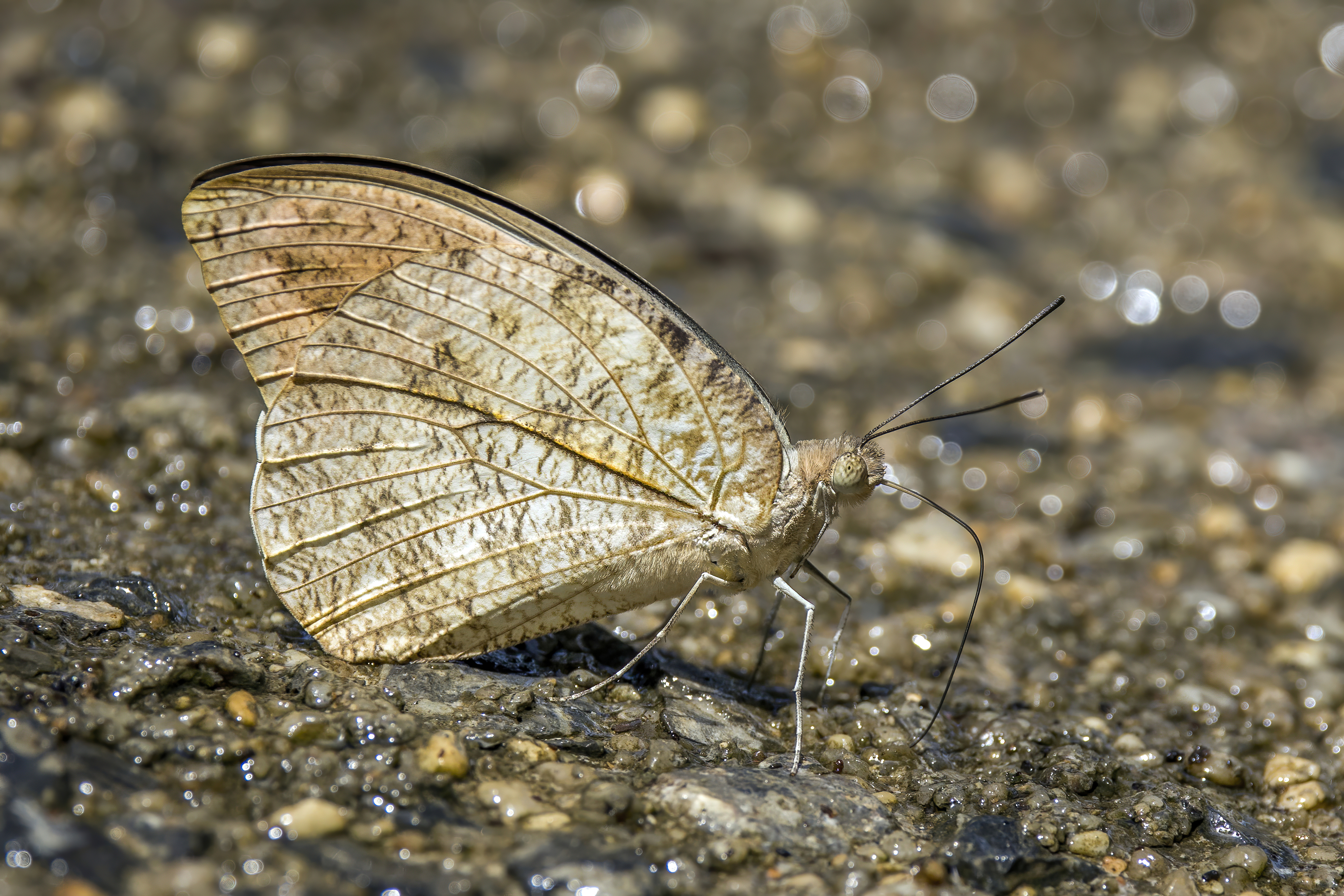
- Thailand both H. g. glaucippe

Scientific classification
- Kingdom: Animalia
- Phylum: Arthropoda
- Clade: Pancrustacea
- Class: Insecta
- Order: Lepidoptera
- Family: Pieridae
- Genus: Hebomoia
- Species: H. glaucippe

Binomial name
- Hebomoia glaucippe (Linnaeus, 1758)

Synonyms
- Papilio glaucippe Linnaeus, 1758

= Hebomoia glaucippe =

Great orange-tip

Species of butterfly

Hebomoia glaucippe, the great orange-tip, is a butterfly belonging to the family Pieridae, that is the yellows and whites. It is found in the Indomalayan realm and Wallacea.

== Distribution ==
This species is found in much of south and southeast Asia, as well as in southern China and southern Japan.

== Subspecies ==
Hebomoia glaucippe has the following 28 subspecies:

- H. g. glaucippe (northern India, China Hainan), Cambodia
- H. g. anaxandra Fruhstorfer (Kalao)
- H. g. anomala Pendlebury, 1939 (Pulau Aur)
- H. g. aturia Fruhstorfer, 1910 (southern Myanmar, Thailand, Peninsular Malaya, Singapore)
- H. g. aurantiaca Fruhstorfer, 1907 (Obi)
- H. g. australis Butler, 1898 (southern India)
- H. g. borneensis (Wallace, 1863) (Borneo)
- H. g. celebensis (Wallace, 1863) (Sulawesi)
- H. g. ceylonica Fruhstorfer, 1907 (Ceylon)
- H. g. chewi Morita, 2006
- H. g. cuyonicola Fruhstorfer, 1907 (Cuyo Islands)
- H. g. erinna Fruhstorfer (Philippines Mindanao)
- H. g. felderi (Vollenhoven, 1865) (Morotai)
- H. g. flavomarginata Pagenstecher, 1896 (Sumba)
- H. g. formosana Fruhstorfer (Taiwan)
- H. g. javanensis (Wallace, 1863) (Java)
- H. g. liukiuensis Fruhstorfer, 1898 (Japan)
- H. g. lombockiana Butler, 1878 (Lombok)
- H. g. palawensis Fruhstorfer, 1907 (Philippines)
- H. g. philippensis (Wallace, 1863) (Philippines)
- H. g. reducta Fruhstorfer, 1907 (Philippines)
- H. g. roepstorffi Wood-Mason, 1880 (Andamans)
- H. g. sulaensis Fruhstorfer, 1907 (Sula Islands)
- H. g. sulphurea (Wallace, 1863) (Bachan)
- H. g. sumatrana Hagen, 1890 (Sumatra)
- H. g. theia Nishimura, 1987
- H. g. timoriensis (Wallace, 1863) (Timor)
- H. g. vossi (Maitland, 1859) (Nias)

== Gallery of subspecies ==
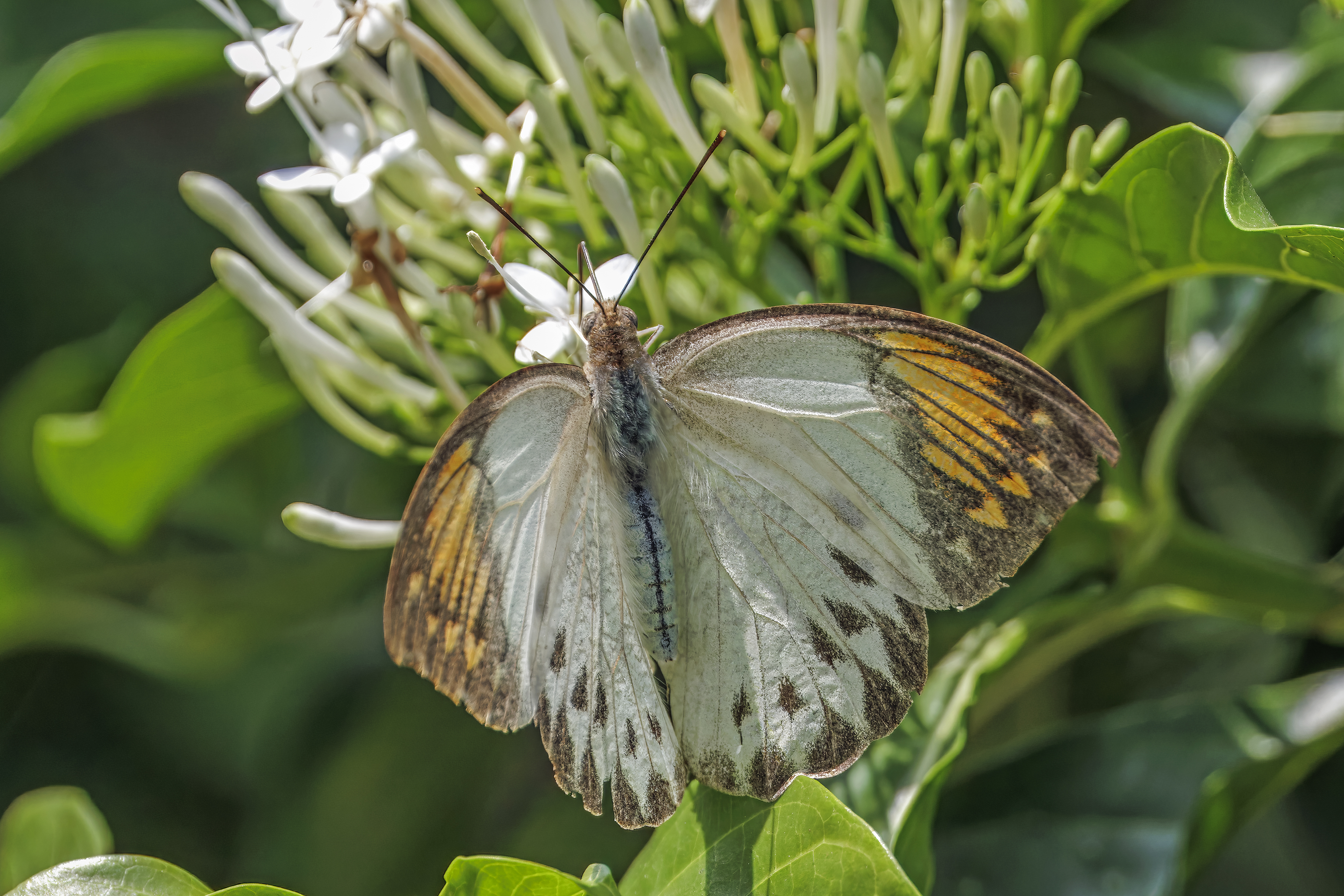
H. g. glaucippe, female

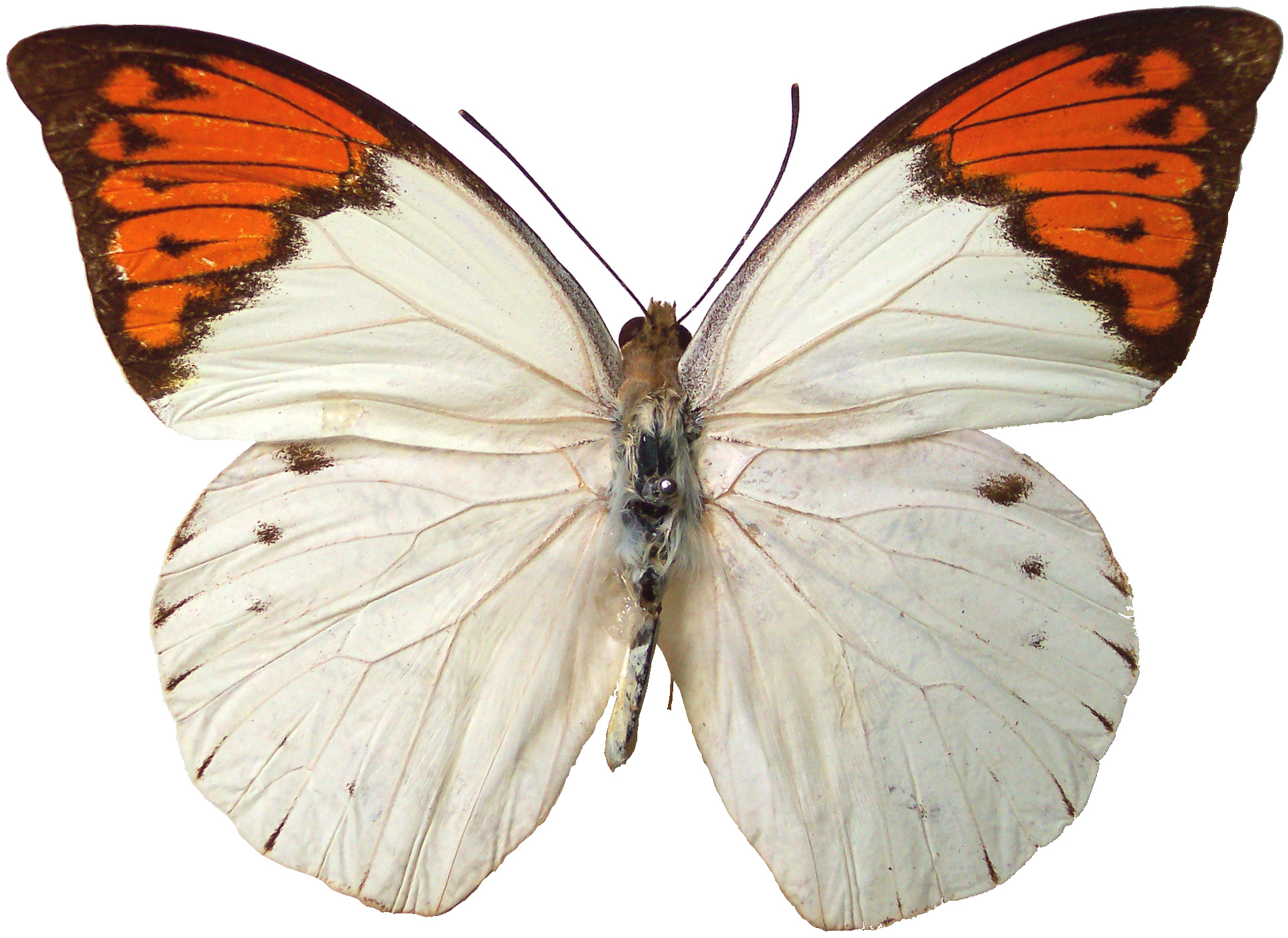
H. g. aturia male

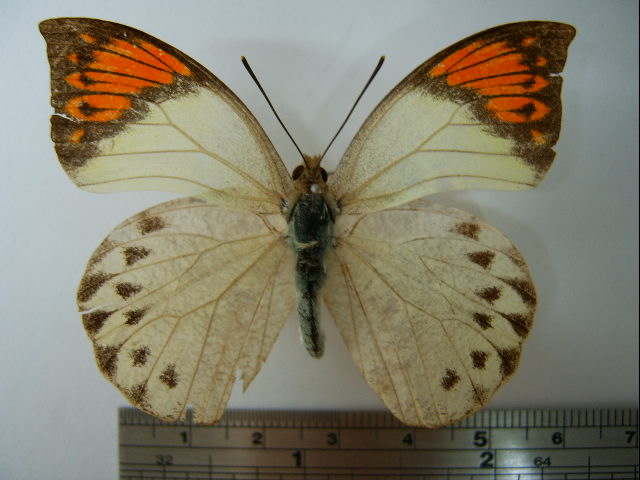
H. g. formosana female

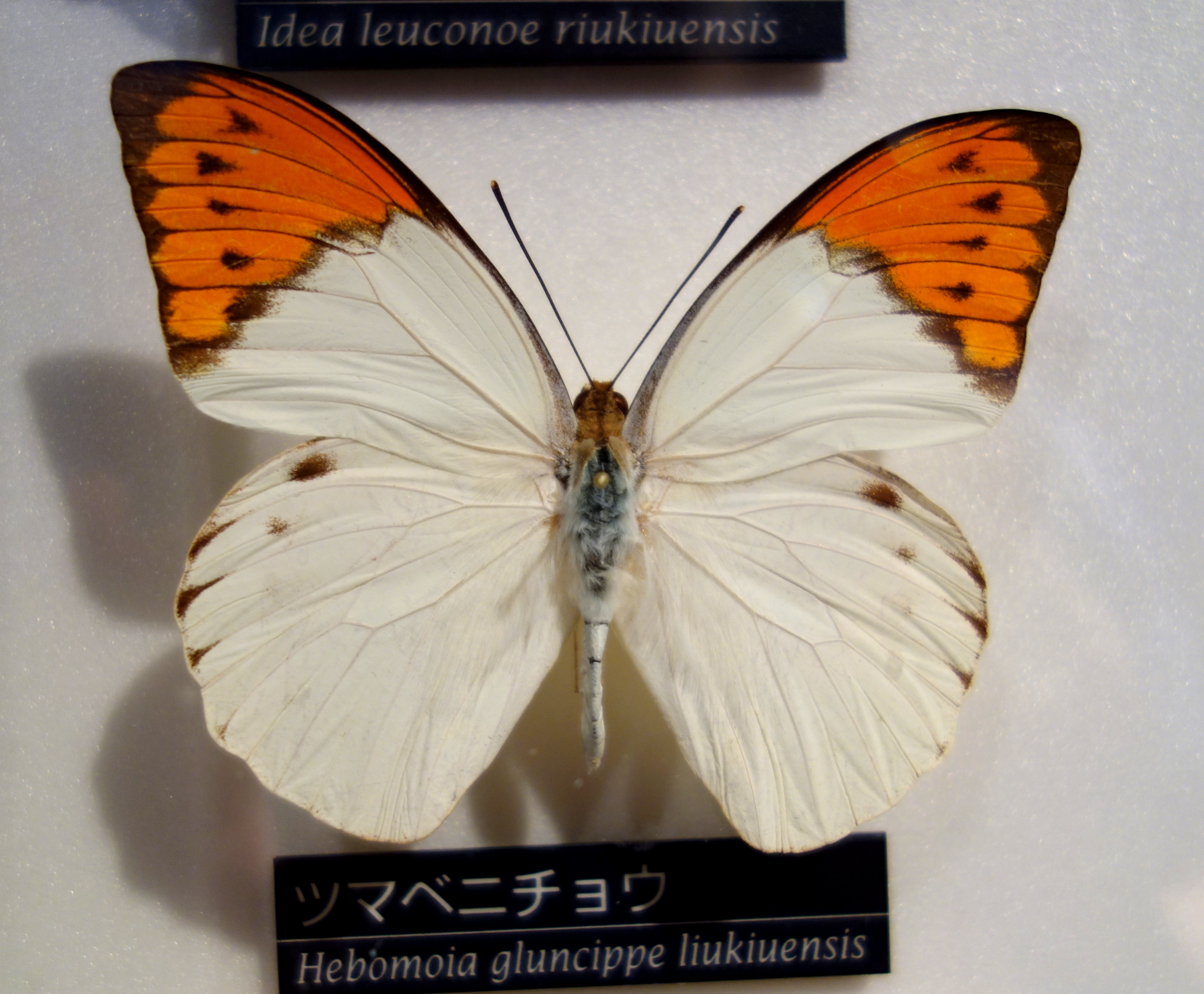
H. g. liukiuensis male

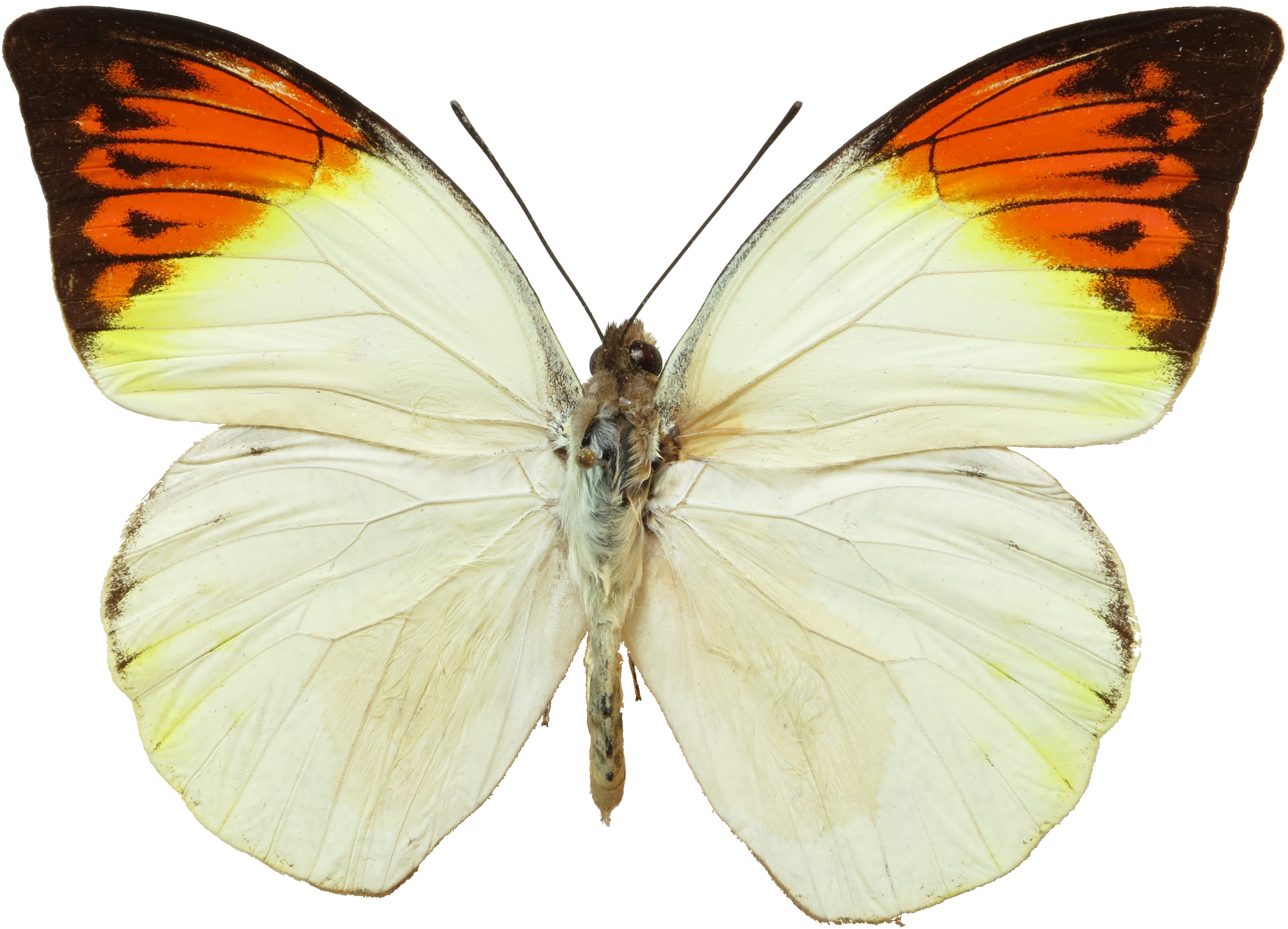
H. g. mindorensis male

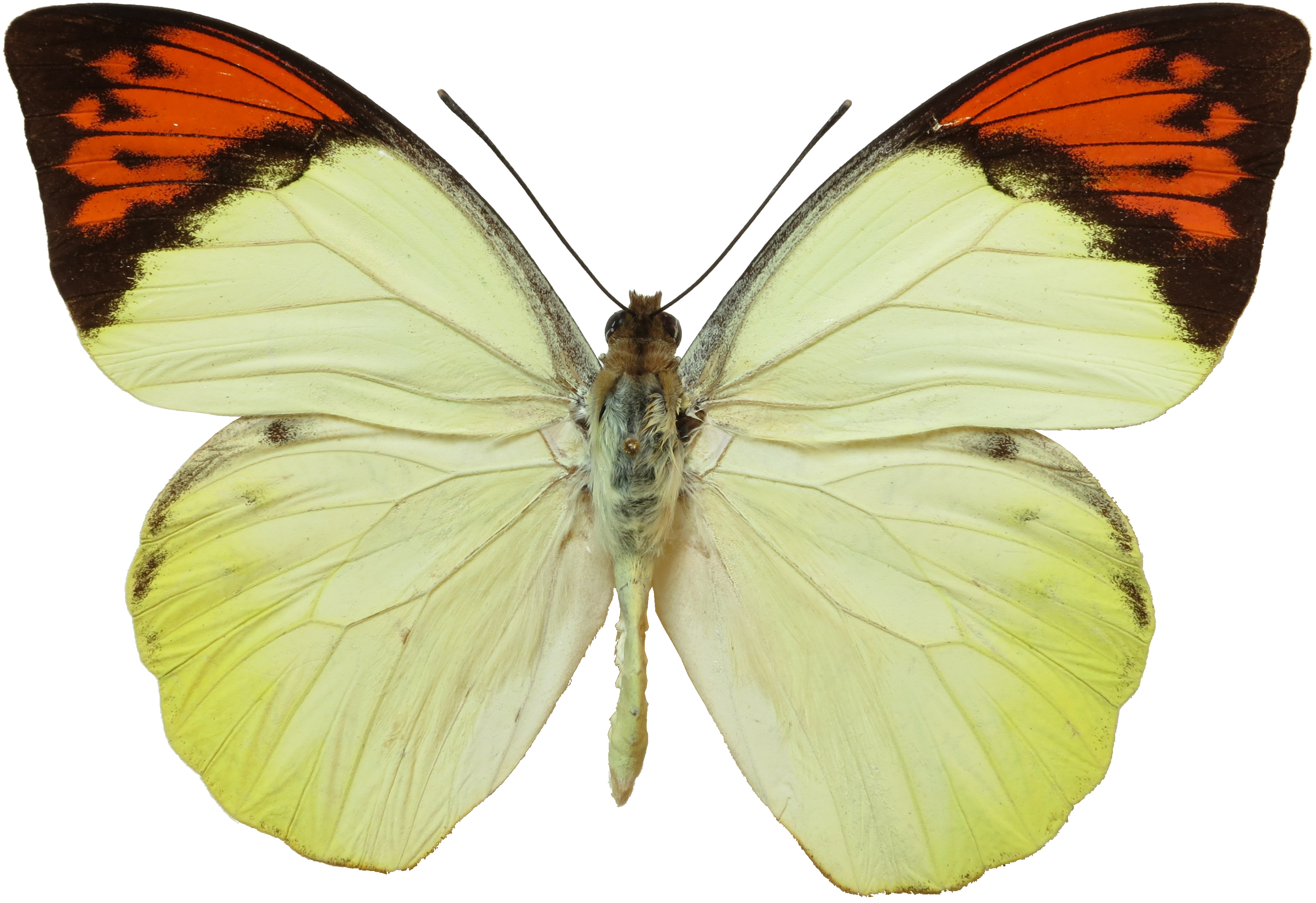
H. g. sulphurea male

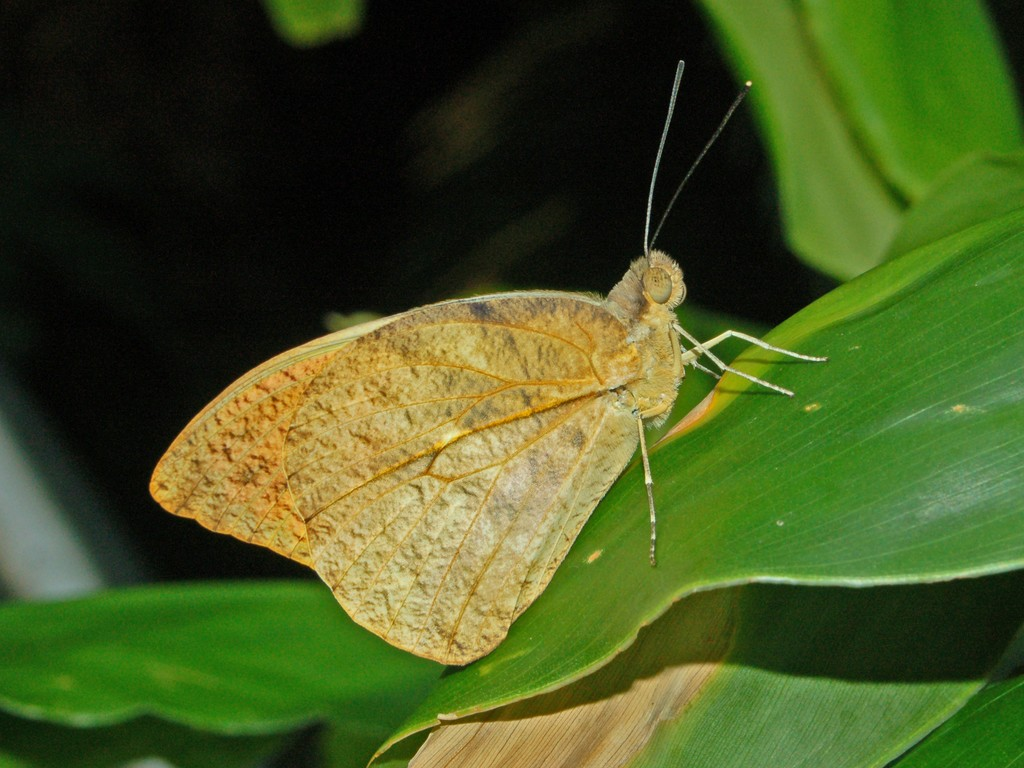
H. g. aturia

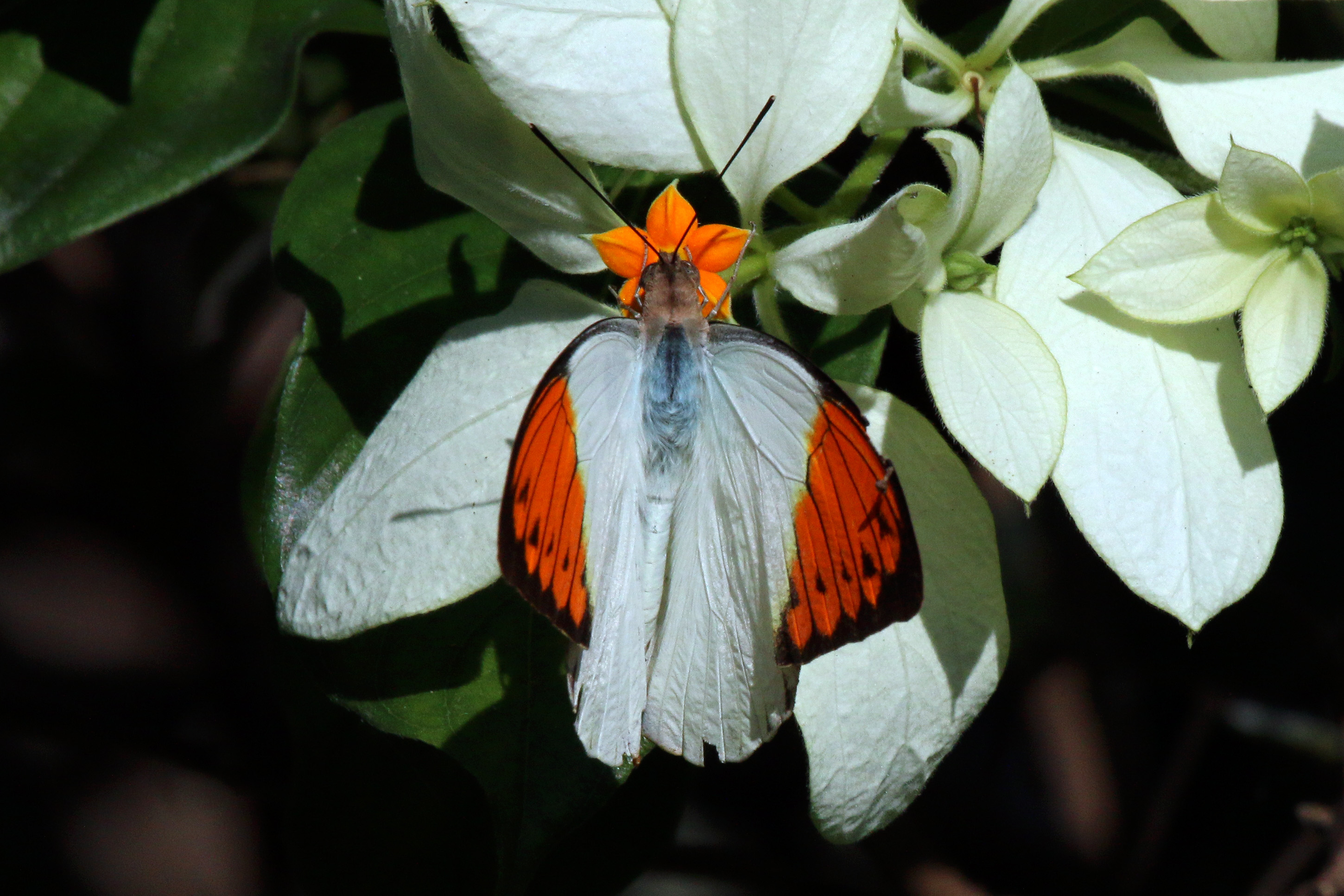
H. g. javanensis

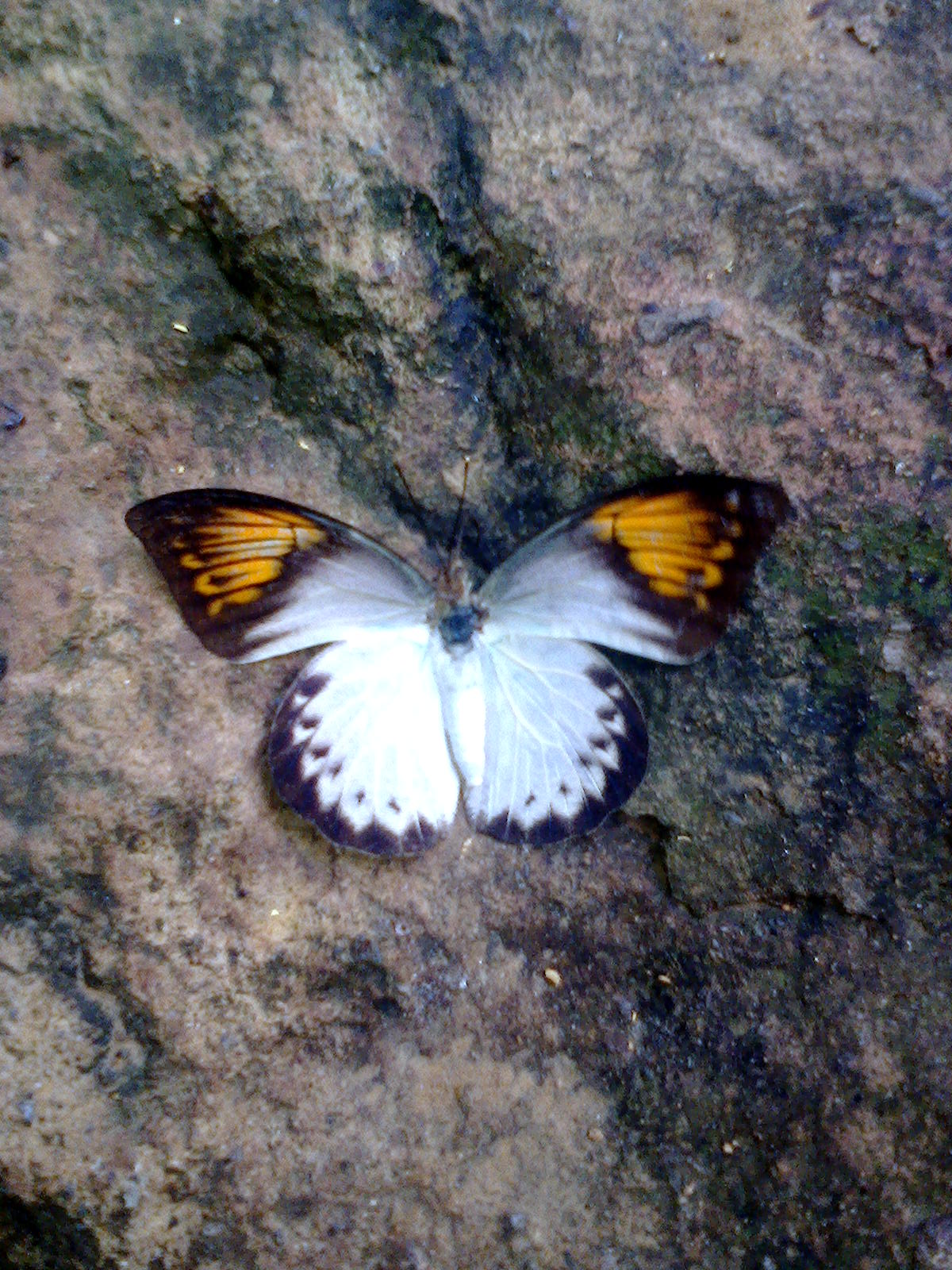
H. g. celebensis female

subspecies and forma in Seitz

== Description ==
The following descriptions are true for much of its range. There are subspecies that differ, such as H. g. vossi where the white is replaced by pure yellow.

=== Wet-season brood ===
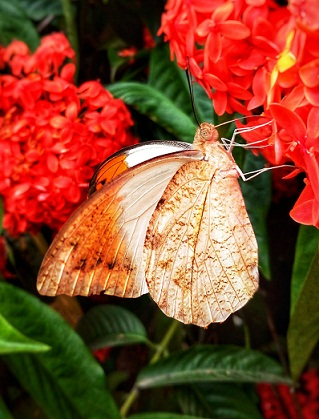
Wet season female form (H. g. glaucippe), at Tripura, India.

In the males the upperside is creamy white. Forewing: the costa narrowly, the apex and terminal margin to middle of interspace 1 are black. An irregular, somewhat sinuous, black band extends obliquely from beyond the middle of the costa across the upper apex of the cell, and meets at interspace 1 the black on the terminal margin. Within the triangle thus formed is enclosed a rich orange-red patch that is traversed by the black veins and bears in interspaces 3 to 6 a postdiscal series of black inwardly elongated spots. Hindwing: nearly uniform, touched with black on the terminal margin anteriorly and with a conspicuous postdiscal black spot in interspace 7. In some specimens there are one or two smaller spots in continuation of the series in the interspaces below.

The underside is white. The apical third of the forewing and the whole of the hindwing are mottled, with more or less prominent brown stripe and spots. Costa of the forewing and a fine line that runs from base of the hindwing through the cell, straight to the middle of the terminal margin, are brown. Antennae are dark brown. The head and thorax have anteriorly a reddish-brown pile. Thorax above is greyish blue, while the abdomen is white with a bluish tinge. Beneath: head and thorax are more or less brownish, abdomen is white.

Female is similar to the male. Upperside: ground colour with a slight greenish tinge. The orange patch on the forewing is more restricted, it consists of a series of brood streaks in interspaces 3 to 6 and 10, the outer apices of which are deeply incised by black and with a row of hastate orange spots beyond in interspaces 2 to 6. Hindwing: similar to the hindwing in the male, but with a postdiscal series of large triangular black spots and a terminal connected series of still larger triangular black spots at the apices of veins 2 to 7. Underside: similar to that in the male, the brown transverse strigae and spots are more numerous, the costa of the fore and the median line on the hindwing are very prominently brown. Antennae, head, thorax and abdomen as in the male.

=== Dry-season brood ===
Differ only from the wet-season brood in the slightly more falcate apex to forewing, and in the purer white ground colour on the upperside. Also the terminal margin on the hindwing in the male has the black markings all but obsolete, while in the female the postdiscal and terminal black markings on the same are smaller than in the wet-season form. Underside: the mottlings of brown strigae and minute spots are more numerous and dense.

Race australis, Butler (Southern India and Sri Lanka). Males and females. Differs only from the typical form in the following particulars: Inner black border to the orange patch on the upperside of the forewing is absent, this represented by a few obsolete touches of black scaling. Hindwing: white throughout, with only a half-obliterated subcostal black spot in interspace 7 in the male; in the female the postdiscal and terminal series of spots are smaller.

== Toxicity ==
In the wings of Hebomoia glaucippe is present glacontryphan-M, a peptide toxin belonging to the family contryphan that are active constituents of the poisonous venom produced by cone snail (genus Conus). In H. glaucippe this toxin should function as a defence against predators.

== The life cycle ==
=== The eggs ===
The eggs are laid on the larval food plants Crataeva religiosa, Capparis moonii, Capparis roxburghii, Capparis cantoniensis and Capparis sepiaria (Capparaceae).

=== Larvae ===
"Subcylindrical, tapering towards each end, numerously-covered with minute tubercles; green." (Moore) Subcylindrical; suddenly tapered at both ends; covered with transverse rows of pointed tubercles. Colour dark green, with a lateral bluish line bordered inferiorly with a series of minute red spots; legs green, the prothoracic legs bordered with black that widens on the middle one of the three.

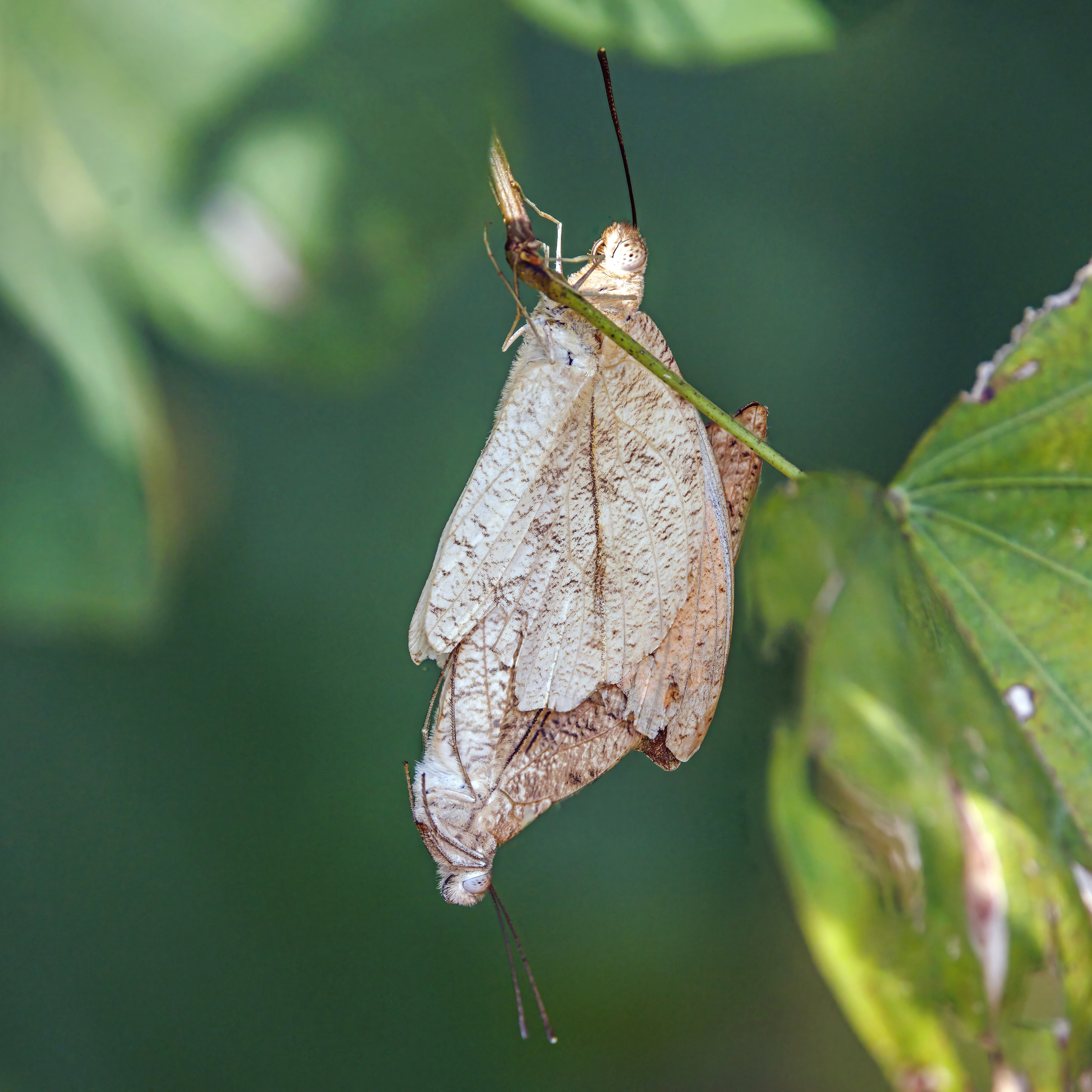
H. g. glaucippe, mating

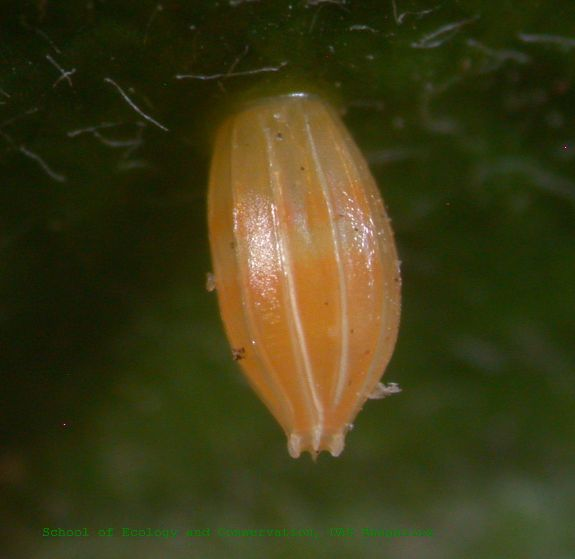
Egg

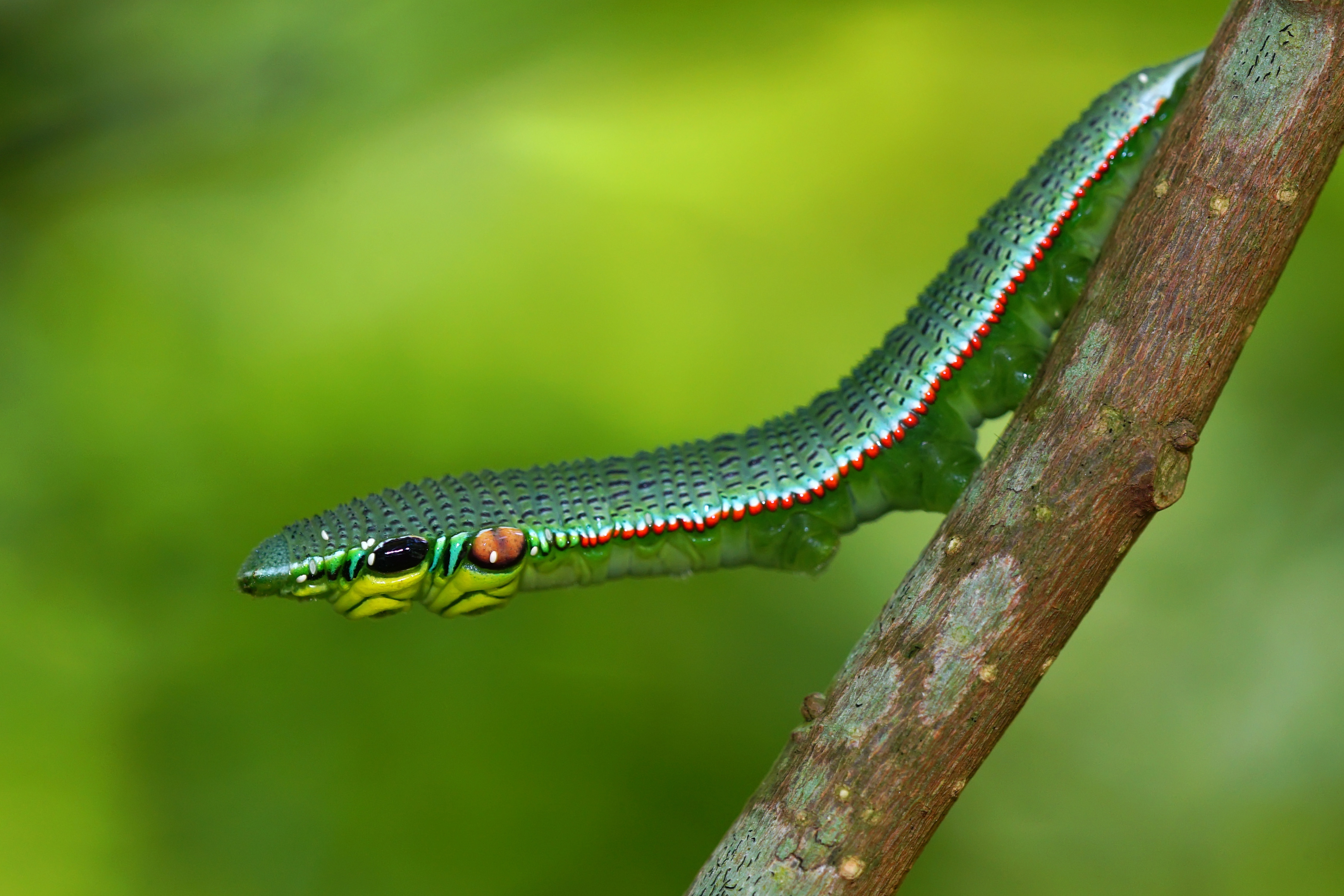
Caterpillar resembling the green vine snake (Ahaetulla nasuta)

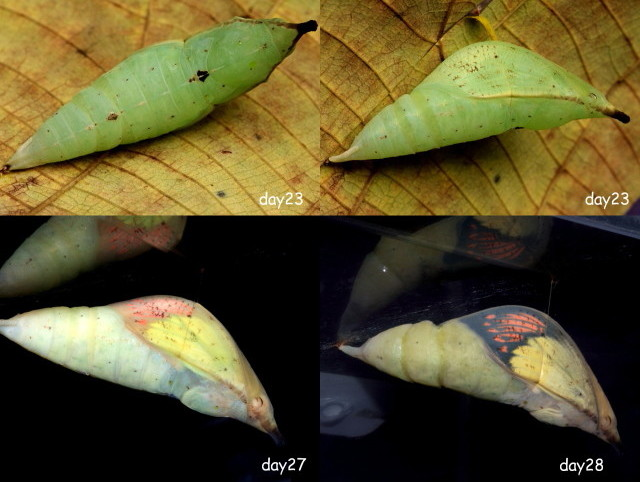
Chrysalis

=== Pupa ===
"Much arched along the back; head pointed." (Moore) Spindle-shaped, head acutely pointed, dorsum much arched. Colour green, a patch of pale ochraceous on the wing-cases and a narrow lateral band of the same colour from head to tail, with a brown line superposed on it that extends to the abdominal segments; abdominal segments and wing-case sparsely spotted with black.

== See also ==
- List of butterflies of India (Pieridae)
