= Conilithes canaliculatus =

Scientific classification
- Kingdom: Animalia
- Phylum: Mollusca
- Class: Gastropoda
- Subclass: Caenogastropoda
- Order: Neogastropoda
- Superfamily: Conoidea
- Family: Conidae
- Genus: †Conilithes
- Species: †C. canaliculatus

Binomial name
- †Conilithes canaliculatus (Brocchi, 1814)

Synonyms
- Conus canaliculatus Brocchi, 1814

Extinct species of gastropod

Conilithes canaliculatus is an extinct species of sea snail, a marine gastropod mollusk, in the family Conidae, the cone snails and their allies.
