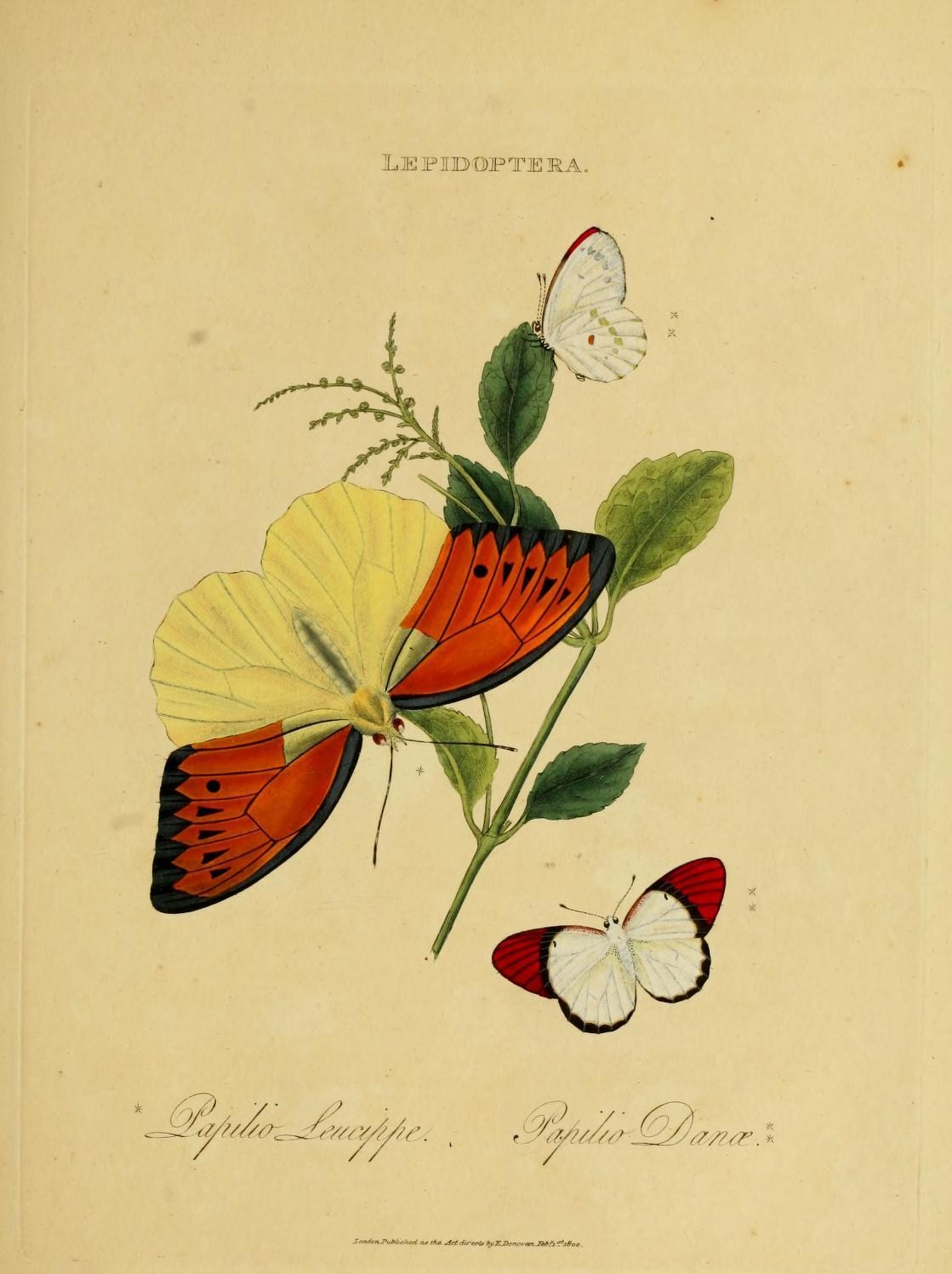
- Hebomoia leucippe in Edward Donovan's An Epitome of the Natural History of the Insects of India

Scientific classification
- Kingdom: Animalia
- Phylum: Arthropoda
- Clade: Pancrustacea
- Class: Insecta
- Order: Lepidoptera
- Family: Pieridae
- Tribe: Anthocharini
- Genus: Hebomoia; Hübner, [1819]

Species
- See text

= Hebomoia =

Butterfly genus in family Pieridae

Hebomoia is a genus of butterflies in the family Pieridae. There are two widespread, strong-flying southeast Asian species that are among the largest pierids.

== Species ==
- Hebomoia glaucippe (Linnaeus, 1758) – great orange tip
- Hebomoia leucippe (Cramer, 1775)
