= Conilithes lyratus =

Scientific classification
- Kingdom: Animalia
- Phylum: Mollusca
- Class: Gastropoda
- Subclass: Caenogastropoda
- Order: Neogastropoda
- Superfamily: Conoidea
- Family: Conidae
- Genus: †Conilithes
- Species: †C. lyratus

Binomial name
- †Conilithes lyratus (P. Marshall, 1918)

Synonyms
- Conospirus marshalli Finlay, 1927; Conus lyratus P. Marshall, 1918

Extinct species of gastropod

Conilithes lyratus is an extinct species of sea snail, a marine gastropod mollusk, in the family Conidae, the cone snails and their allies.

== Distribution ==
This species occurs in New Zealand.
