= Conilithes sceptophorus =

Scientific classification
- Kingdom: Animalia
- Phylum: Mollusca
- Class: Gastropoda
- Subclass: Caenogastropoda
- Order: Neogastropoda
- Superfamily: Conoidea
- Family: Conidae
- Genus: †Conilithes
- Species: †C. sceptophorus

Binomial name
- †Conilithes sceptophorus (O. Boettger, 1887)

Synonyms
- Conus (Chelyconus) sceptophorus O. Boettger, 1887; Conus sceptophorus O. Boettger, 1887

Extinct species of gastropod

Conilithes sceptophorus is an extinct species of sea snail, a marine gastropod mollusk, in the family Conidae, the cone snails and their allies.
