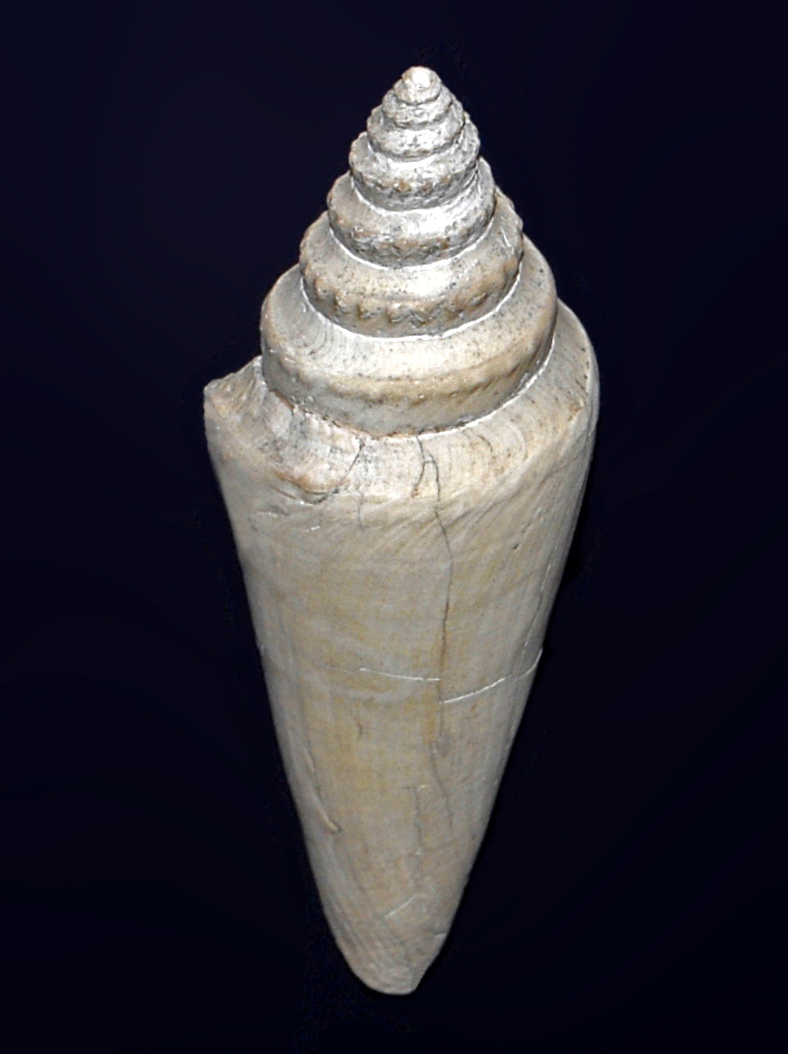
- Specimen from the Pliocene of Asti (Northern Italy)

Scientific classification
- Kingdom: Animalia
- Phylum: Mollusca
- Class: Gastropoda
- Subclass: Caenogastropoda
- Order: Neogastropoda
- Superfamily: Conoidea
- Family: Conidae
- Genus: †Conilithes
- Species: †C. antidiluvianus

Binomial name
- †Conilithes antidiluvianus (Bruguière, 1792)

Synonyms
- Conus (Conospira) antideluvianus (Bruguière, 1792); Conus (Conospirus) antidiluvianus Bruguière, 1792; Conus antediluvianus Bruguière, 1792; Conus antidiluvianus Bruguière, 1792

= Conilithes antidiluvianus =

Extinct species of gastropod

Conilithes antidiluvianus is an extinct species of sea snail, a marine gastropod mollusk, in the family Conidae, the cone snails and their allies.

== Distribution ==
This species occurs in the following locations:

- Italy (type locality)
- Austria
- Bosnia and Herzegovina
- Bulgaria
- Czech Republic
- France
- Hungary
- Romania
- Slovakia
- Syria
- Turkey
