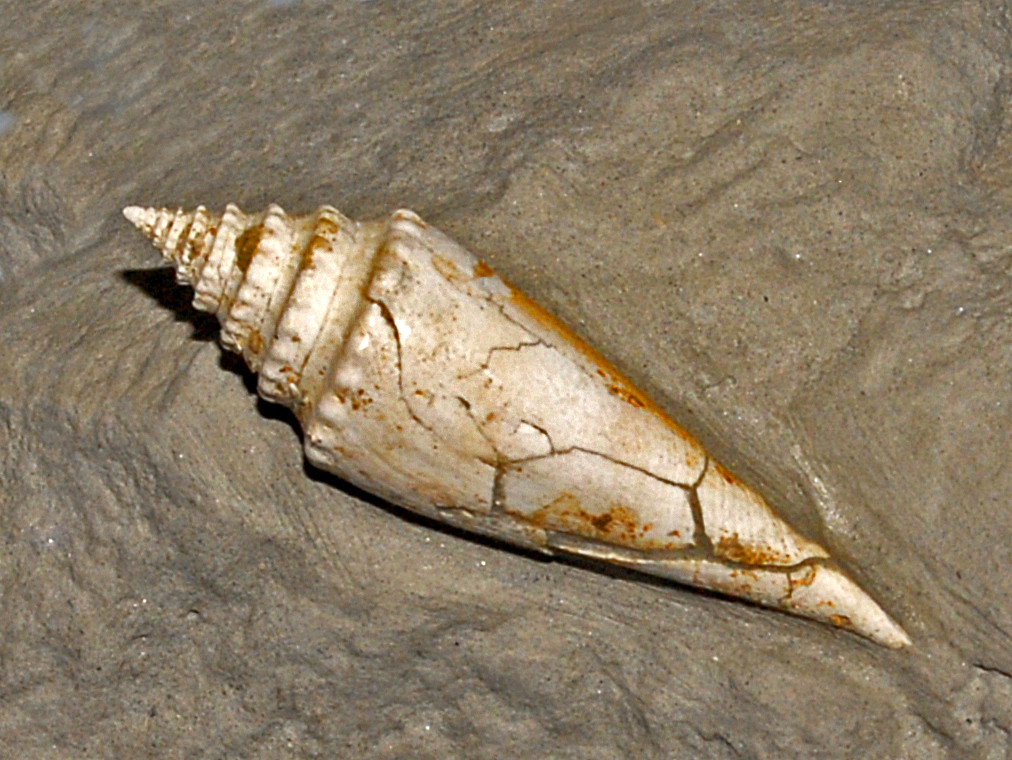
- Fossil shell of Conilithes antidiluvianus from Italy

Scientific classification
- Kingdom: Animalia
- Phylum: Mollusca
- Class: Gastropoda
- Subclass: Caenogastropoda
- Order: Neogastropoda
- Superfamily: Conoidea
- Family: Conidae
- Genus: †Conilithes; Swainson 1840

Type species
- † Conus antidiluvianus Bruguière, 1792

Synonyms
- † Conilites Schlotheim, 1820 unavailable name (unavailable under Code 20 of the Code); † Conolithus Herrmannsen, 1847 (unjustified emendation of...); † Conospira Cossmann, 1896 (unjustified emendation of...); † Conospirus De Gregorio, 1890; † Conus (Conolithes) misspelling - incorrect subsequent spelling (incorrect subsequent spelling of Conilithes Swainson 1840); † Conus (Conospira) Cossmann, 1896 (unjustified emendation of Conus...); † Conus (Conospirus) De Gregorio, 1890 (junior objective synonym); † Coronaxis (Conilithes) Swainson, 1840 (original rank)

= Conilithes =

Conilithes Temporal range: Lutetian–Piacenzian

Extinct genus of gastropods

Conilithes is an extinct genus of sea snails, marine gastropod mollusks in the family Conidae, the cone snails.

This genus is known in the fossil record from the Lutetian (Eocene) of France, the United Kingdom, and New Zealand to the Piacenzian (Pliocene) of Italy (age range: 48.6 to 2.588 million years ago).

Conolithus (Hermannsen, 1846) is an "invalid emendation" of Conilithes (Swainson, 1840), in the terminology introduced in the Copenhagen Decisions on Zoological Nomenclature (London, 1953: 43). Conilithes Swainson (spelled Conolithes by Wenz) is a junior homonym of Conilites (Schloth, 1820) (spelled Conolites by Wenz)

== Species ==
- † Conilithes allioni (Michelotti, 1847)
- † Conilithes antidiluvianus (Bruguiére, 1792)
- † Conilithes aquitanicus (Mayer, 1858)
- † Conilithes asyli (De Gregorio, 1880)
- † Conilithes brezinae (Hoernes & Auinger, 1879)
- † Conilithes brockenensis (Vella, 1954)
- † Conilithes brocchii (Bronn, 1828)
- † Conilithes canaliculatus (Brocchi, 1814)
- - Conilithes desidiosus (Adams, 1854)
- † Conilithes dujardini (Deshayes, 1845)
- † Conilithes dujardini egerensis (Noszky, 1937)
- † Conilithes dujardini sallomacensis (Peyrot, 1930)
- † Conilithes eichwaldi (Harzhauser & Landau, 2016)
- † Conilithes exaltatus (Eichwald, 1830)
- † Conilithes fracta (Finlay, 1924)
- † Conilithes huttoni (Tate, 1890)
- † Conilithes lyratus (P. Marshall, 1918)
- † Conilithes oliveri (Marwick, 1931)
- † Conilithes parisiensis (Deshayes, 1865)
- † Conilithes pendulus pusillanimis (De Gregorio, 1880)
- † Conilithes rivertonensis (Finlay, 1926)
- † Conilithes sceptophorus (Boettger, 1887)
- † Conilithes suteri (Cossmann, 1918)
- † Conilithes tahuensis (R. S. Allan, 1926)
- † Conilithes wollastoni (Maxwell, 1978)

== Notes ==
The specimen indicated as Conus deperditus by Suter in 1917 was referred to as Conospira suteri by Cossmann in 1918 and as Conospira fracta by Finlay in 1924.
