= Conilithes brocchii =

Scientific classification
- Kingdom: Animalia
- Phylum: Mollusca
- Class: Gastropoda
- Subclass: Caenogastropoda
- Order: Neogastropoda
- Superfamily: Conoidea
- Family: Conidae
- Genus: †Conilithes
- Species: †C. brocchii

Binomial name
- †Conilithes brocchii (Bronn, 1828)

Extinct species of gastropod

Conilithes brocchii is an extinct species of sea snail, a marine gastropod mollusk, in the family Conidae, the cone snails and their allies.
