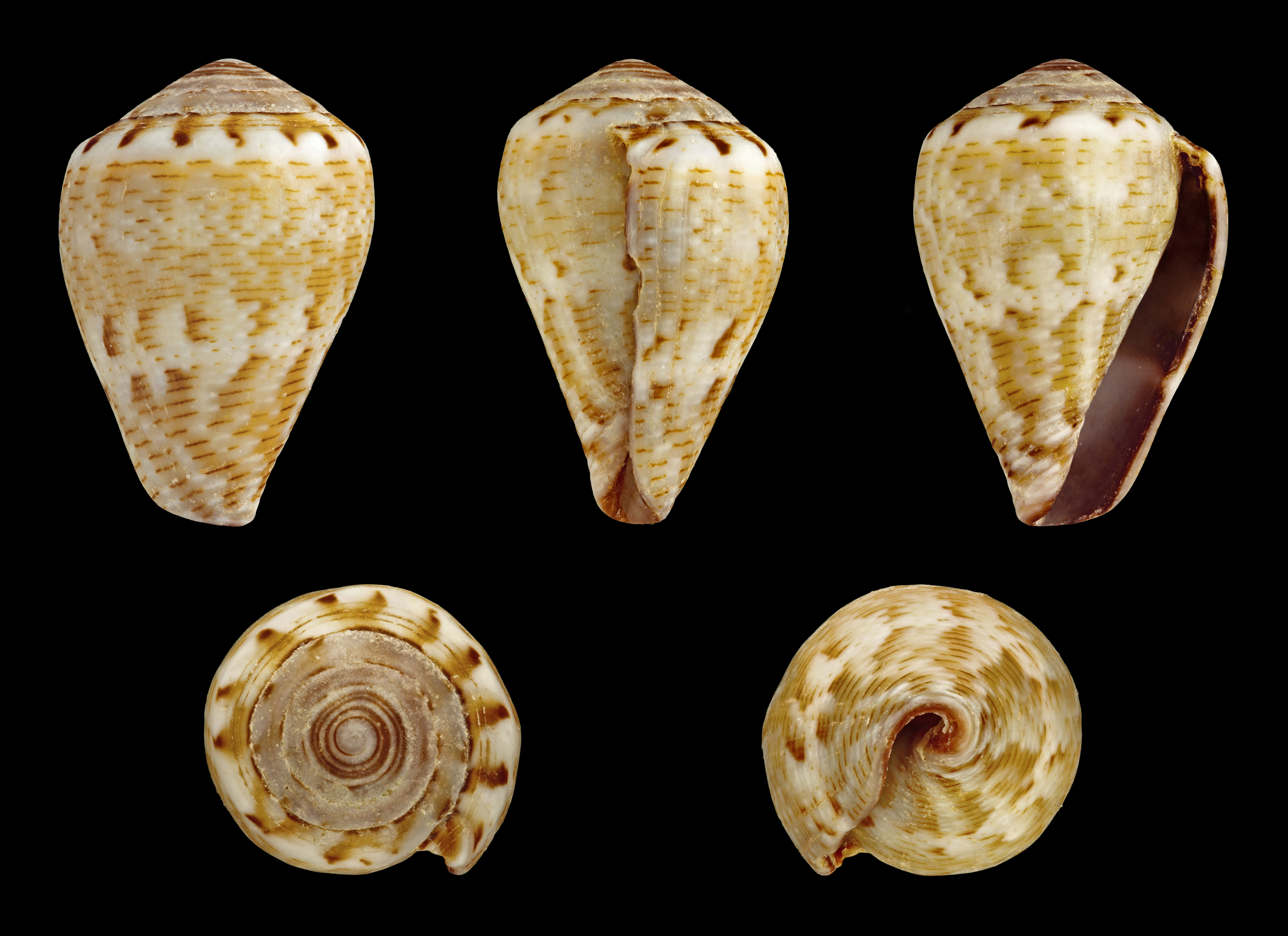

Scientific classification
- Kingdom: Animalia
- Phylum: Mollusca
- Class: Gastropoda
- Subclass: Caenogastropoda
- Order: Neogastropoda
- Family: Conidae
- Genus: Conus
- Species: C. ventricosus
- Subspecies: C. v. mediterraneus

Trinomial name
- Conus ventricosus mediterraneus Hwass in Bruguière, 1792

Synonyms
- See list

= Conus ventricosus mediterraneus =

Species of sea snail

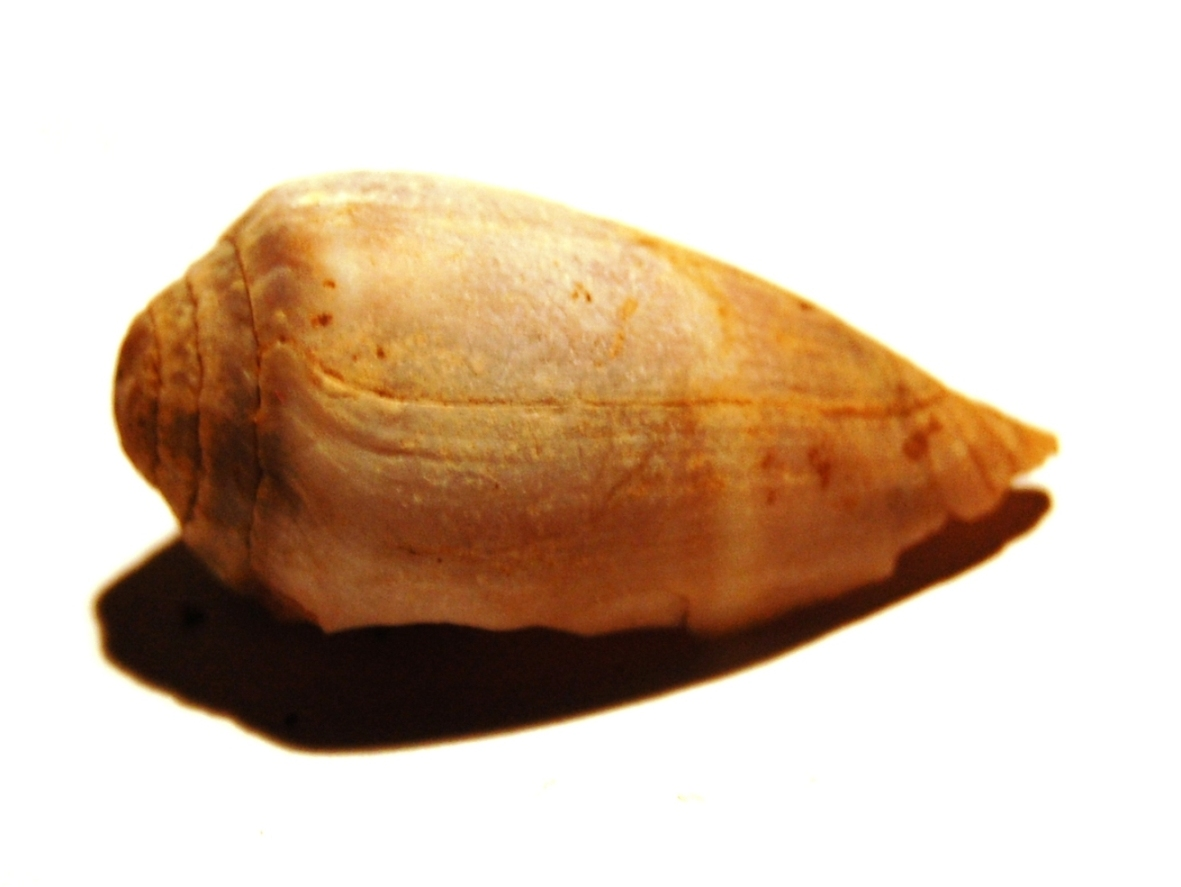
A very beach-worn shell of Conus ventricosus mediterraneus.

Conus ventricosus mediterraneus is a subspecies of sea snail, a marine gastropod mollusk in the family Conidae, the cone snails and their allies.

Like all species within the genus Conus, these snails are predatory and venomous. They are capable of stinging humans, therefore live ones should be handled carefully or not at all.

== Description ==
The size of an adult shell varies between 13 mm and 63 mm. The color of the shell is yellowish brown, pink-brown or olivaceous; sometimes chocolate-brown, very closely nebulously spotted and reticulated; and sometimes interrupted-lined with chestnut, with a narrow, light band below the middle. The elevated spire is rudely gradate and maculated. The interior of the shell is light chocolate, with a light band.

== Distribution ==
This subspecies occurs in the Mediterranean Sea, but not in the Eastern Atlantic Ocean off Senegal.

== Synonyms ==
- Conus adriaticus Nardo, 1847
- Conus alticonica Pallary, 1904
- Conus amazonicus Nardo, 1847
- Conus ammiralis var. americanus Gmelin, 1791
- Conus caffer Bucquoy, Dautzenberg & Dollfus, 1882
- Conus caillaudi Jay, 1846
- Conus chersoideus Nardo, 1847
- Conus cinctus Bosc, 1801
- Conus cinereus Delle Chiaje & Poli, 1826
- Conus clodianus Nardo, 1847
- Conus cretheus Nardo, 1847
- Conus elpus De Gregorio, 1885
- Conus epaphus Nardo, 1847
- Conus erosus Renier, 1804
- Conus franciscanus Hwass in Bruguière, 1792
- Conus galloprovincialis Locard, 1886
- Conus galloprovincialis var. lineolata Locard & Caziot, 1900
- Conus galloprovincialis var. minor Locard & Caziot, 1900
- Conus glaucescens G. B. Sowerby II, 1834
- Conus grossii Maravigna, 1853
- Conus guestieri Lorois, 1860
- Conus hanleyi G. B. Sowerby II, 1857 Conus hanley Conus hanley
- Conus herillus Nardo, 1847
- Conus humilis von Salis Marschlins, 1793
- Conus ignobilis Olivi, 1792
- Conus ignobilis var. rufa Scacchi, 1836
- Conus inaequalis Reeve, 1849
- Conus intermedius Lamarck, 1810
- Conus istriensis Nardo, 1847
- Conus jamaicensis Hwass in Bruguière, 1792
- Conus jaspis von Salis Marschlins, 1793
- Conus madurensis Hwass in Bruguière, 1792
- Conus mediterraneus f. gaudiosus Nicolay, 1978
- Conus mediterraneus var. acuta Requien, 1848
- Conus mediterraneus var. alalmus DeGregorio, 1885
- Conus mediterraneus var. alba Coen, 1933
- Conus mediterraneus var. albina Bucquoy, Dautzenberg & Dollfus, 1882
- Conus mediterraneus var. alticonica Pallary, 1904
- Conus mediterraneus var. amigus DeGregorio, 1885
- Conus mediterraneus var. arenaria Monterosato, 1917
- Conus mediterraneus var. ater Philippi, 1836
- Conus mediterraneus var. caerulescens Bucquoy, Dautzenberg & Dollfus, 1883
- Conus mediterraneus var. carinata Bucquoy, Dautzenberg & Dollfus, 1884
- Conus mediterraneus var. castanea Coen, 1933
- Conus mediterraneus var. debilis Monterosato, 1917
- Conus mediterraneus var. elongata Bucquoy, Dautzenberg & Dollfus, 1885
- Conus mediterraneus var. emisus DeGregorio, 1885
- Conus mediterraneus var. fasciata Requien, 1848
- Conus mediterraneus var. flammulata Bucquoy, Dautzenberg & Dollfus, 1886
- Conus mediterraneus var. flavescens Coen, 1933
- Conus mediterraneus var. fusca Bucquoy, Dautzenberg & Dollfus, 1887
- Conus mediterraneus var. interrupta Coen, 1933
- Conus mediterraneus var. lutea Bucquoy, Dautzenberg & Dollfus, 1888
- Conus mediterraneus var. major Bucquoy, Dautzenberg & Dollfus, 1889
- Conus mediterraneus var. marmoratus Philippi, 1836
- Conus mediterraneus var. minor Monterosato, 1878
- Conus mediterraneus var. oblonga Bucquoy, Dautzenberg & Dollfus, 1890
- Conus mediterraneus var. obtusa Requien, 1848
- Conus mediterraneus var. pallida Bucquoy, Dautzenberg & Dollfus, 1891
- Conus mediterraneus var. persistens Kobelt, 1906
- Conus mediterraneus var. pretunculus Monterosato, 1917
- Conus mediterraneus var. rubens Bucquoy, Dautzenberg & Dollfus, 1892
- Conus mediterraneus var. rufatra DeGregorio, 1885
- Conus mediterraneus var. scalare Dautzenberg, 1911
- Conus mediterraneus var. scalaris Pallary, 1912
- Conus mediterraneus var. subconcolor Requien, 1848
- Conus mediterraneus var. subviridis DeGregorio, 1885
- Conus mediterraneus var. vayssierei Kobelt, 1906
- Conus olivaceus von Salis Marschlins, 1793
- Conus olivaceus Kiener, 1845
- Conus pallans Nardo, 1847
- Conus phegeus Nardo, 1847
- Conus postdiluvianus Risso, 1826
- Conus rusticus Poli, 1826
- Conus siculus DelleChiaje, 1828
- Conus stercutius Nardo, 1847
- Conus submediterraneus Locard, 1886
- Conus thuscus Nardo, 1847
- Conus trunculus Monterosato, 1899
- Conus vayssierei var. ossea Monterosato, 1917
- Conus ventricosus Gmelin, 1791
- Conus ventricosus var. elpus DeGregorio, 1885
- Conus ventricosus var. empismus DeGregorio, 1885
- Lautoconus noeformis Monterosato, 1923
