= Contryphan =

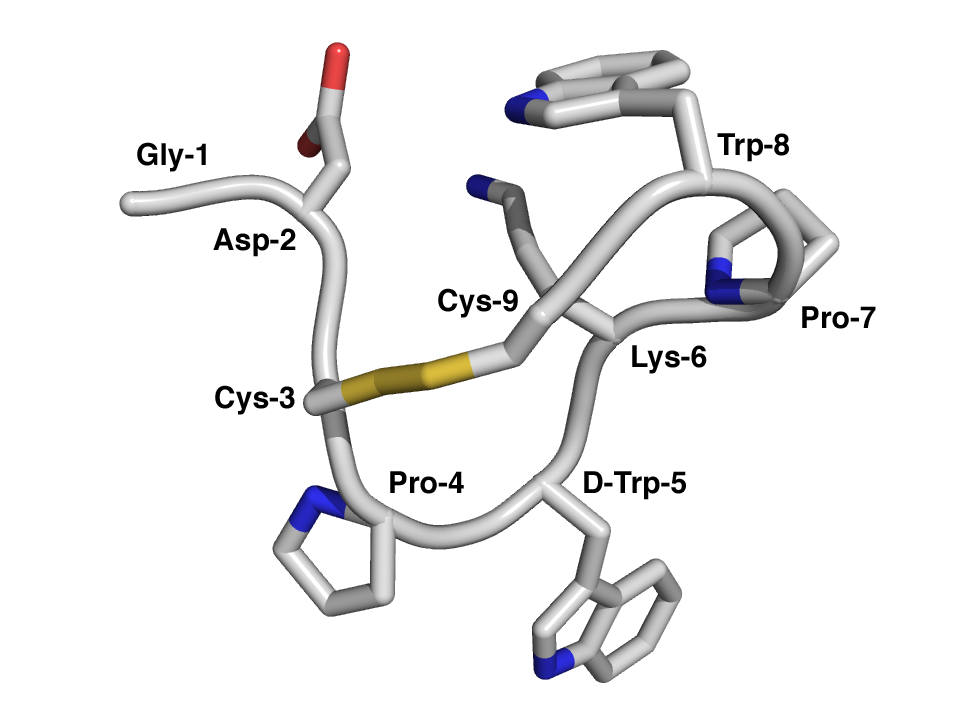
- NMR structure of Contryphan-Vn. The peptide backbone is depicted by a curved tube while the amino acid side-chains are represented by capped sticks. Carbon atoms are colored grey, nitrogen atoms blue, oxygen atoms red, and sulfur atoms yellow..

Identifiers
- Symbol: Contryphan_CS
- Pfam: PF02950
- InterPro: IPR011062
- PROSITE: PS60027
- SCOP2: 2cco / SCOPe / SUPFAM
Available protein structures:
- Pfam: structures / ECOD
- PDB: RCSB PDB; PDBe; PDBj
- PDBsum: structure summary
- PDB: 1dfy, 1dfz , 1dg0 , 1nxn , 1qfb

The contryphans (conus + tryptophan) are a family of peptides that are active constituents of the potent venom produced by cone snail (genus Conus). The two amino acid cysteine residues in contryphans are linked by a disulfide bond. In addition, contryphans undergo an unusual degree of post-translational modification including epimerization of leucine and tryptophan, tryptophan bromination, amidation of the C-terminus, and proline hydroxylation. In the broader scheme of genetic conotoxin classification, contryphans are members of "Conotoxin Superfamily O2."

== Family members ==
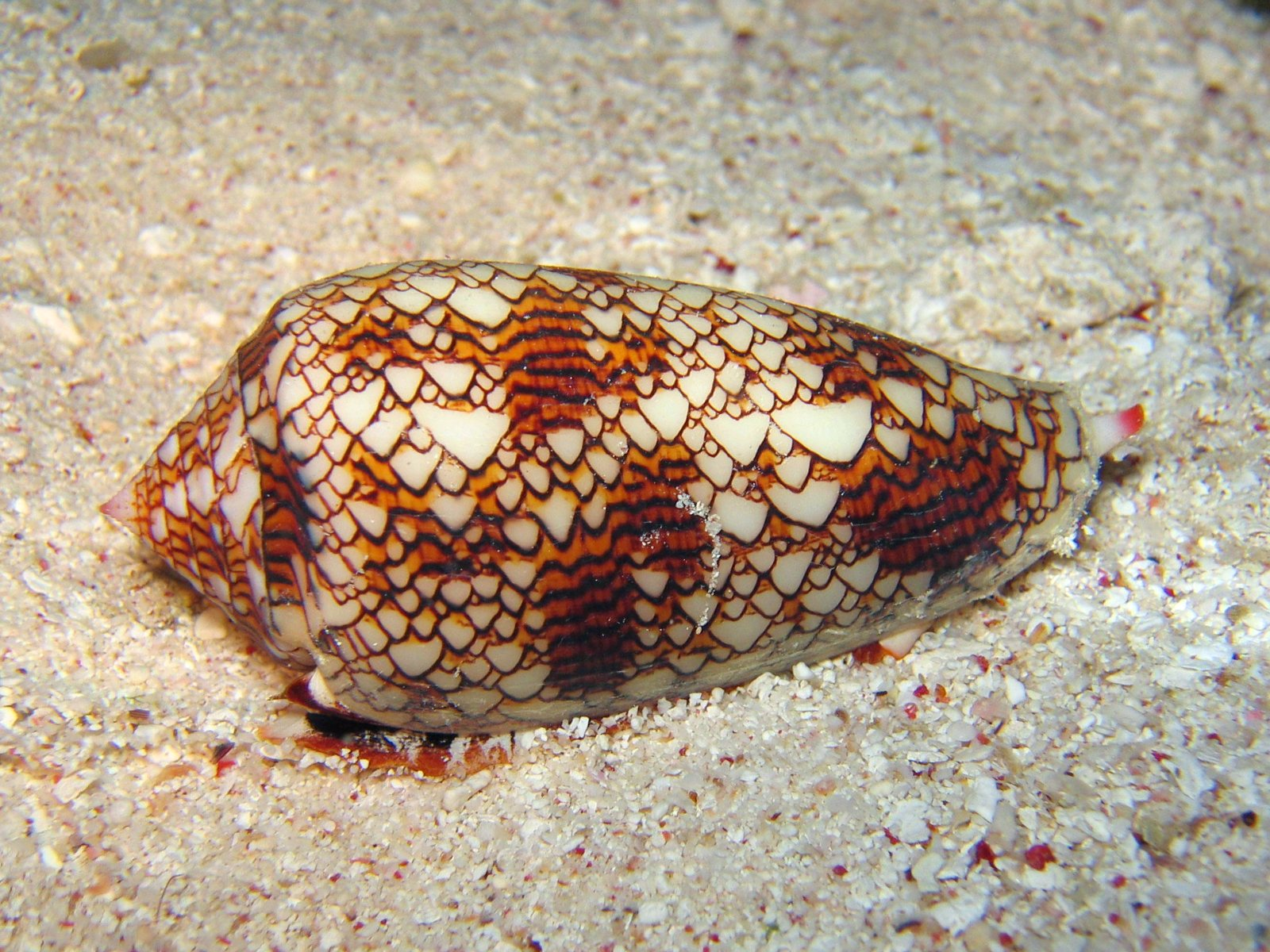
Conus textile, which produces contryphans

Contryphan family members include:

Peptide	Sequence	Species	Reference
Des(Gly1)contryphan-R	COwEPWC-NH2	C. radiatus	
Contryphan-R	GCOwEPWC-NH2	Conus radiatus	
Bromocontyphan-R	GCOwEPXC-NH2	C. radiatus	
Contryphan-Sm	GCOwQPWC-NH2	Conus stercusmuscarum	
Contryphan-P	GCOwDPWC-NH_{2}	C. purpurascens	
Contryphan-R/Tx	GCOwEPWC-NH2	Conus textile	
Contryphan-Tx	GCOWQPYC-NH2	Conus textile	
Contryphan-Vn	GDCPwKPWC-NH_{2}	Conus ventricosus	
Leu-contryphan-P	GCVlLPWC-OH	Conus purpurascens	
Leu-contryphan-Tx	CVlYPWC-NH_{2}	Conus textile	
Glaconryphan-M	NγSγCPWHPWC-NH_{2}	Conus marmoreus	

where the sequence abbreviations stand for:

- O = 4-trans-hydroxyproline,
- l = D-leucine, L = L-leucine,
- w = D-tryptophan, W = L-tryptophan,
- γ = gamma-carboxyglutamic acid,
- NH_{2} = C-terminal amidation

and the remainder of the letters refer to the standard one letter abbreviations for amino acids.

== Mechanism of toxicity ==
The venom of cone snails cause paralysis of their fish prey. The molecular target has not been determined for all contryphan peptides, however it is known that contryphan-Vn is a Ca^{2+}-dependent K^{+} channel modulator, while glacontryphan-M is a L-type calcium channel blocker.
