= Conilithes exaltatus =

Scientific classification
- Kingdom: Animalia
- Phylum: Mollusca
- Class: Gastropoda
- Subclass: Caenogastropoda
- Order: Neogastropoda
- Superfamily: Conoidea
- Family: Conidae
- Genus: †Conilithes
- Species: †C. exaltatus

Binomial name
- †Conilithes exaltatus (Eichwald, 1830)

Synonyms
- Conilithes dujardini (Deshayes, 1845); Conus (Conospira) antideluvianus var. buiturica Moisescu, 1955; Conus dujardini Deshayes, 1845; Conus exaltatus Eichwald, 1830; Conus subacutangulus d'Orbigny, 1852

Extinct species of gastropod

Conilithes exaltatus is an extinct species of sea snail, a marine gastropod mollusk, in the family Conidae, the cone snails and their allies.

== Distribution ==
This fossil occurs and is mostly found in the following locations:

- Austria
- Bosnia and Herzegovina
- Bulgaria
- Czech Republic
- Germany
- Hungary
- Poland
