= Conilithes huttoni =

Conilithes huttoni Temporal range: Altonian

Scientific classification
- Kingdom: Animalia
- Phylum: Mollusca
- Class: Gastropoda
- Subclass: Caenogastropoda
- Order: Neogastropoda
- Family: Conidae
- Genus: †Conilithes
- Species: †C. huttoni

Binomial name
- †Conilithes huttoni (Tate, 1890)

Synonyms
- † Conus huttoni Tate, 1890 (superseded combination); † Conus trailli F. W. Hutton, 1873 (invalid: junior homonym of Conus traillii A. Adams, 1855; C. huttoni is a replacement name)

Species of sea snail

Conilithes huttoni is a fossil species of sea snail, a marine gastropod mollusk in the family Conidae, the cone snails, cone shells or cones.

== Distribution ==
This marine species occurs as a fossil in the Early Miocene off New Zealand, where it occurs in Altonian-aged marine strata, comparable in age to the Aquitanian stage.
