= Conilithes allioni =

Scientific classification
- Kingdom: Animalia
- Phylum: Mollusca
- Class: Gastropoda
- Subclass: Caenogastropoda
- Order: Neogastropoda
- Superfamily: Conoidea
- Family: Conidae
- Genus: †Conilithes
- Species: †C. allioni

Binomial name
- †Conilithes allioni (Michelotti, 1847)

Synonyms
- Conus (Leptoconus) allionii Michelotti, 1847; Conus (Leptoconus) allionii var. conicospirata Sacco, 1893; Conus (Leptoconus) allionii var. perconicospirata Sacco, 1893; Conus (Leptoconus) allionii var. perfuniculata Sacco, 1893; Conus (Leptoconus) allionii var. perpupoidespira Sacco, 1893; Conus (Leptoconus) allionii var. pupoidespira Sacco, 1893; Conus (Leptoconus) raulini Peyrot, 1931; Conus allioni Michelotti, 1847; Conus oblitus Michelotti, 1847; Conus raulini Peyrot, 1931

Extinct species of gastropod

Conilithes allioni is an extinct species of sea snail, a marine gastropod mollusk, in the family Conidae, the cone snails and their allies.

== Distribution ==
This species occurs in the following locations:

- Austria
- Germany
