= Conilithes brezinae =

Scientific classification
- Kingdom: Animalia
- Phylum: Mollusca
- Class: Gastropoda
- Subclass: Caenogastropoda
- Order: Neogastropoda
- Superfamily: Conoidea
- Family: Conidae
- Genus: †Conilithes
- Species: †C. brezinae

Binomial name
- †Conilithes brezinae (Hoernes & Auinger, 1879)

Synonyms
- Conus (Leptoconus) brezinae Hoernes & Auinger, 1879; Conus brezinae Hoernes & Auinger, 1879

Extinct species of gastropod

Conilithes brezinae is an extinct species of sea snail, a marine gastropod mollusk, in the family Conidae, the cone snails and their allies.

== Distribution ==
This species occurs in the following locations:

- Bosnia and Herzegovina
- Czech Republic
- Hungary
- Poland
- Romania
- Slovakia
- Slovenia
- Turkey
