= Conilithes wollastoni =

Scientific classification
- Kingdom: Animalia
- Phylum: Mollusca
- Class: Gastropoda
- Subclass: Caenogastropoda
- Order: Neogastropoda
- Superfamily: Conoidea
- Family: Conidae
- Genus: †Conilithes
- Species: †C. wollastoni

Binomial name
- †Conilithes wollastoni Maxwell, 1978

Synonyms
- Conospirus bimutatus Finlay, 1924; Conus huttoni Tate, 1890; Conus ornatus Hutton, 1873

Extinct species of gastropod

Conilithes wollastoni is an extinct species of sea snail, a marine gastropod mollusk, in the family Conidae, the cone snails and their allies.

== Distribution ==
This species occurs in New Zealand.
