= Conilithes rivertonensis =

Scientific classification
- Kingdom: Animalia
- Phylum: Mollusca
- Class: Gastropoda
- Subclass: Caenogastropoda
- Order: Neogastropoda
- Superfamily: Conoidea
- Family: Conidae
- Genus: †Conilithes
- Species: †C. rivertonensis

Binomial name
- †Conilithes rivertonensis (Finlay, 1926)

Synonyms
- Conospira rivertonensis Finlay, 1926

Extinct species of gastropod

Conilithes rivertonensis is an extinct species of sea snail, a marine gastropod mollusk, in the family Conidae, the cone snails and their allies.

== Distribution ==
This species occurs in New Zealand.
