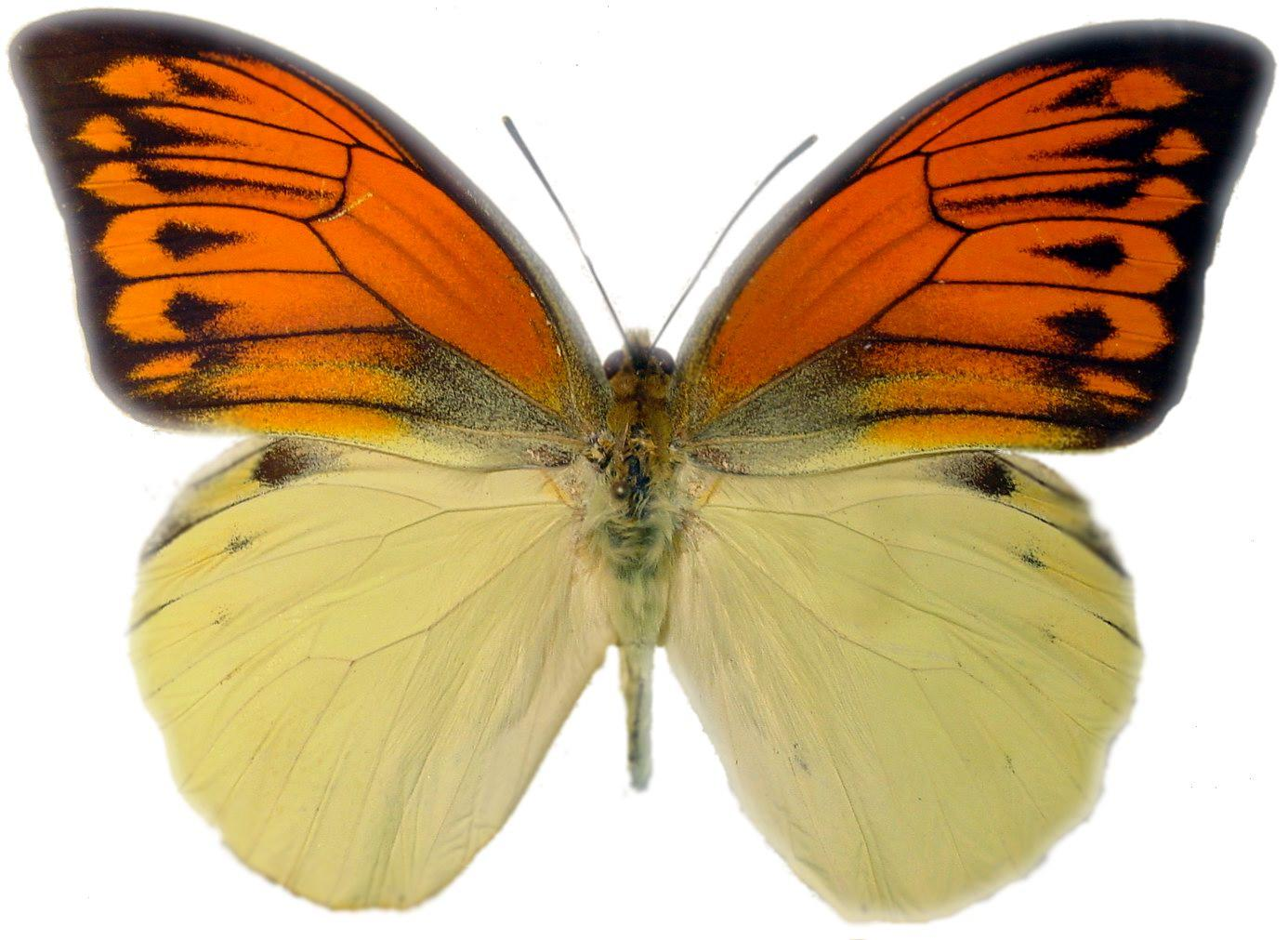

Scientific classification
- Kingdom: Animalia
- Phylum: Arthropoda
- Clade: Pancrustacea
- Class: Insecta
- Order: Lepidoptera
- Family: Pieridae
- Genus: Hebomoia
- Species: H. leucippe

Binomial name
- Hebomoia leucippe (Cramer, [1775])

Synonyms
- Papilio leucippe

= Hebomoia leucippe =

Species of butterfly

Hebomoia leucippe is a butterfly in the family Pieridae. It is endemic to the Moluccas and Peleng in Indonesia. The wingspan of H. leucippe is approximately 8 cm (3.1 in).

== Subspecies ==
- H. l. leucippe (Cramer, [1775]) – from Ambon, Haruku, and Saparua
- H. l. daemonis Fruhstorfer, 1907 – from Seram
- H. l. leucogynia (Wallace, 1863) – from Buru
- H. l. detanii Nishimura, 1983 – entirely orange, from Pelang, Banggai

== Gallery of subspecies ==
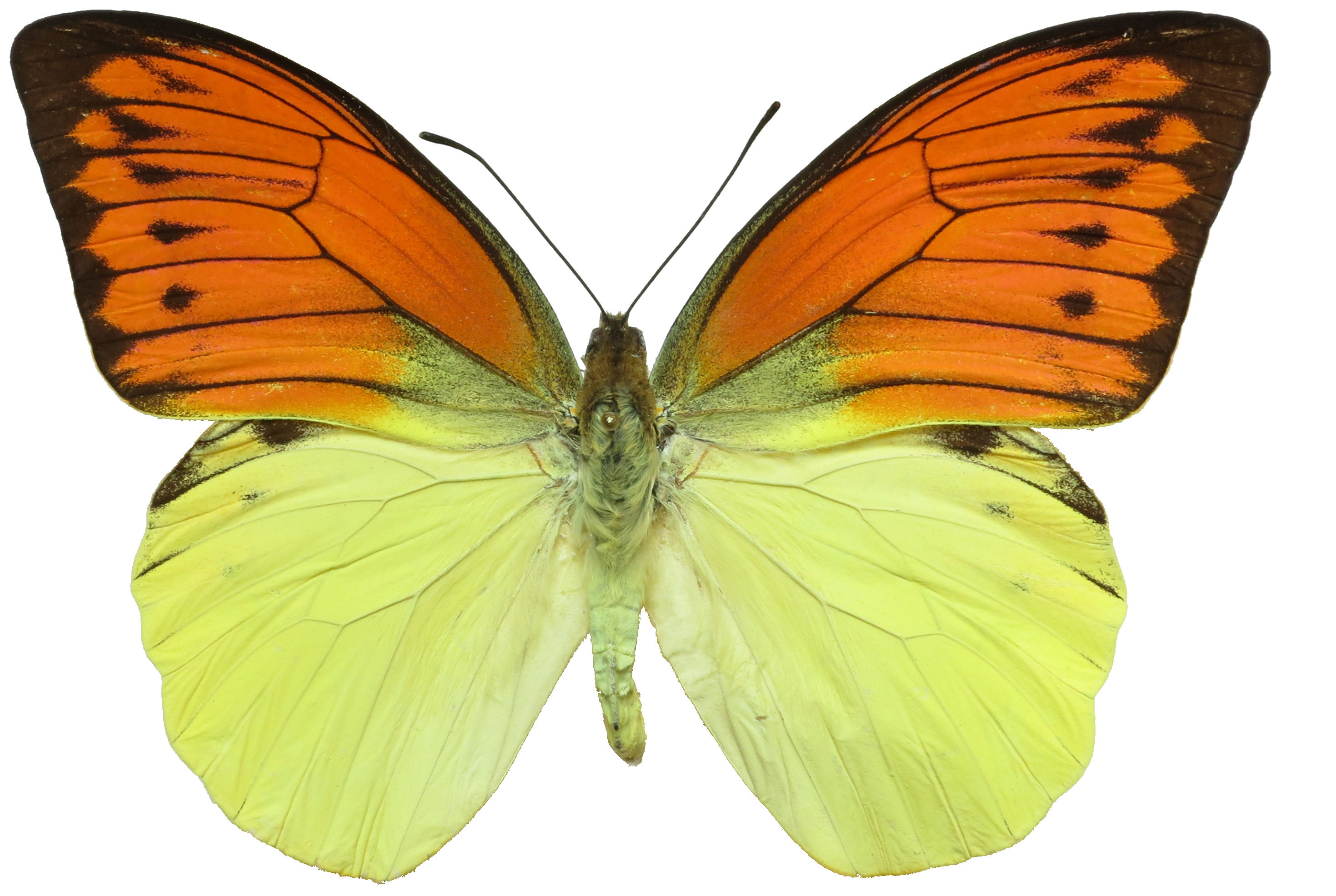
H. l. leucippe male

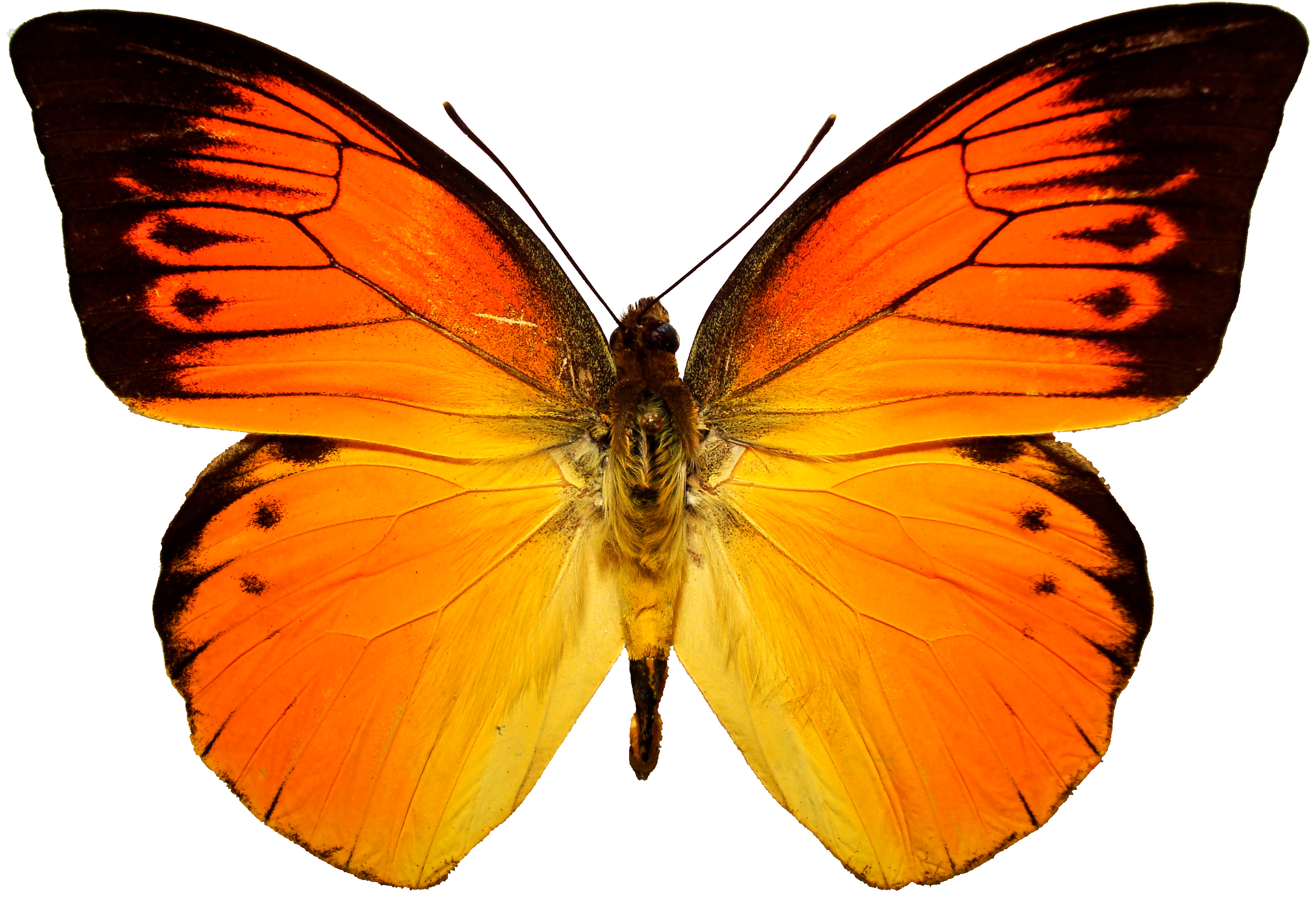
H. l. detanii male
