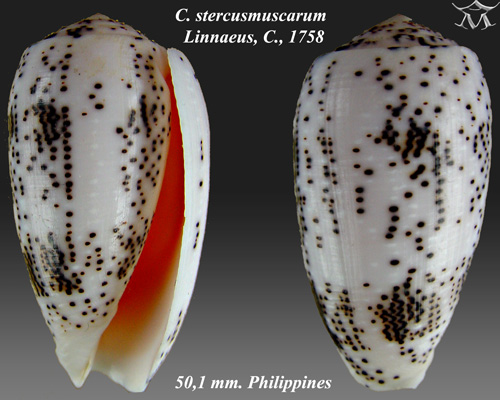
- Apertural and abapertural views of shell of Conus stercusmuscarum Linnaeus, C., 1758
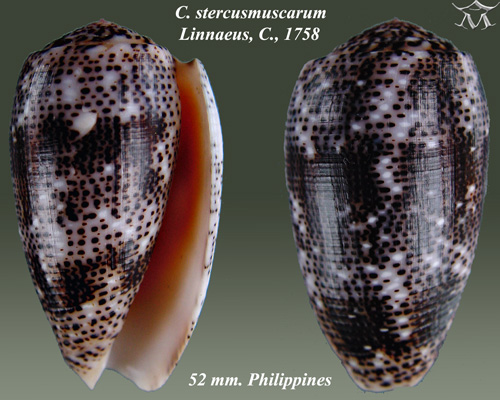

Conservation status
- Least Concern (IUCN 3.1)

Scientific classification
- Kingdom: Animalia
- Phylum: Mollusca
- Class: Gastropoda
- Subclass: Caenogastropoda
- Order: Neogastropoda
- Superfamily: Conoidea
- Family: Conidae
- Genus: Conus
- Species: C. stercusmuscarum

Binomial name
- Conus stercusmuscarum Linnaeus, 1758

Synonyms
- Conus (Pionoconus) stercusmuscarum Linnaeus, 1758 · accepted, alternate representation; Cucullus arenatus Röding, 1798 (junior secondary homonym of Conus arenatus Hwass in Bruguière, 1792); Cucullus sabella Röding, 1798; Puncticulus stercusmuscarius (Linnaeus, 1758); Textilia stercusmuscarum (Linnaeus, 1758)

= Conus stercusmuscarum =

Species of sea snail

Conus stercusmuscarum, common name the fly-specked cone, is a species of sea snail, a marine gastropod mollusk in the family Conidae, the cone snails and their allies.

These snails are predatory and venomous. They are capable of stinging humans, therefore live ones should be handled carefully or not at all.

== Description ==
The size of the shell varies between 27 mm and 64 mm.

== Distribution ==
This piscivorous species occurs in the Western Pacific Ocean: Fiji, Marshall Islands, Papua New Guinea, Solomon Islands; also off Indonesia, Japan, Taiwan, the Philippines, and Australia (Northern Territory, Queensland).

== Gallery ==
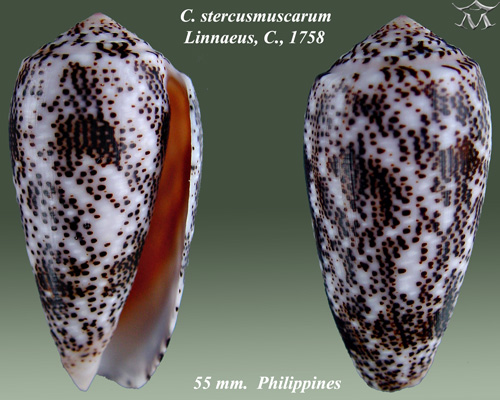
Conus stercusmuscarum Linnaeus, C., 1758

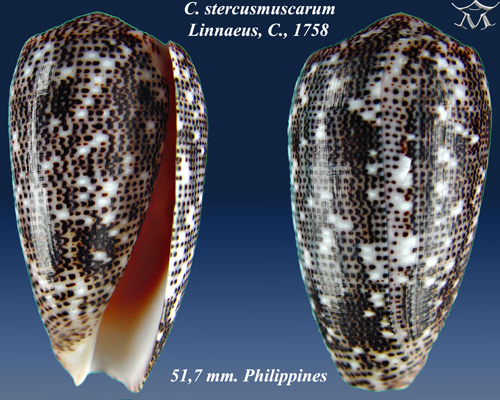
Conus stercusmuscarum Linnaeus, C., 1758

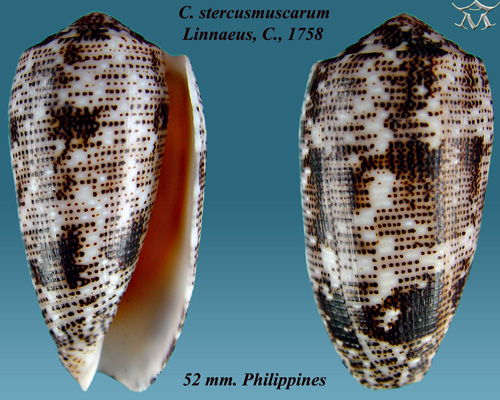
Conus stercusmuscarum Linnaeus, C., 1758
