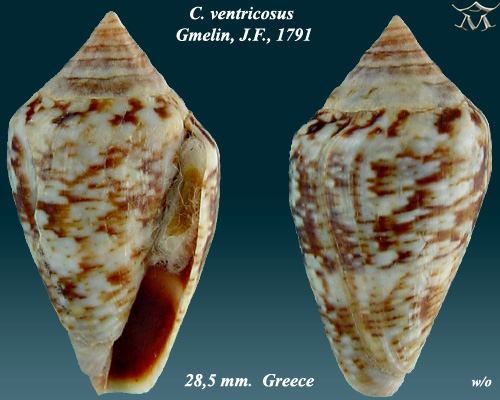
- Apertural and abapertural views of shell of Conus ventricosus Gmelin, J.F., 1791
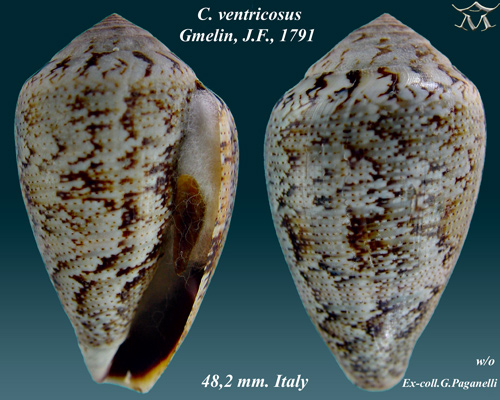

Conservation status
- Least Concern (IUCN 3.1)

Scientific classification
- Kingdom: Animalia
- Phylum: Mollusca
- Class: Gastropoda
- Subclass: Caenogastropoda
- Order: Neogastropoda
- Superfamily: Conoidea
- Family: Conidae
- Genus: Conus
- Species: C. ventricosus

Binomial name
- Conus ventricosus Gmelin, 1791

Synonyms
- See "List of synonyms"

= Conus ventricosus =

Species of sea snail

Conus ventricosus, common name the Mediterranean cone, is a species of sea snail, a marine gastropod mollusk in the family Conidae, the cone snails and their allies.

- Conus ventricosus mediterraneus Hwass in Bruguière, 1792, is a recognized subspecies.

Like all species within the genus Conus, these snails are predatory and venomous. They are capable of stinging humans, therefore live ones should be handled carefully or not at all.

== Description ==
The size of the shell varies between 13 mm and 63 mm. The shell is yellowish brown, pink-brown or olivaceous. It is sometimes chocolate-brown, very closely nebulously spotted and reticulated. And sometimes it is interrupted-lined with chestnut, with a narrow, light band below the middle. The spire is elevated, rudely gradate and maculated. The interior of the aperture is light chocolate, with a light band.

The peptide Contryphan-Vn was extracted from the venom of this marine snail. It is part of a complex mixture of poisonous compounds secreted by this cone snailand used in worm hunting.

== Distribution ==
This marine species has a wide distribution found in shallow waters ranging in the Mediterranean Sea.

It was also found as a fossil from the Pliocene and the Miocene.

== List of synonyms ==
This is a long list
- Conus (Lautoconus) ventricosus Gmelin, 1791 · accepted, alternate representation
- Conus adansonii Lamarck, 1810
- Conus adriaticus Nardo, 1847
- Conus amazonicus Nardo, 1847
- Conus caillaudi Jay, 1846
- Conus chersoideus Nardo, 1847
- Conus cinctus Bosc, 1801
- Conus clodianus Nardo, 1847
- Conus cretheus Nardo, 1847
- Conus epaphus Nardo, 1847
- Conus epaticus Renier, 1804 (unavailable name: published in a work placed on the Official Index of Invalid and Rejected Specific Names in Zoology by ICZN Opinion 316)
- Conus errosus Renier, 1804 (unavailable name: published in a work placed on the Official Index of Invalid and Rejected Specific Names in Zoology by ICZN Opinion 316)
- Conus fortis Renier, 1804 (unavailable name: published in a work placed on the Official Index of Invalid and Rejected Specific Names in Zoology by ICZN Opinion 316)
- Conus franciscanus Bruguière, 1792
- Conus galloprovincialis Locard, 1886
- Conus galloprovincialis var. lineolata Locard & Caziot, 1900 (invalid: junior homonym of Conus lineolatus Valenciennes, 1832)
- Conus galloprovincialis var. minor Locard & Caziot, 1900 (invalid: junior homonym of Conus ventricosus var. minor Monterosato, 1878)
- Conus galloprovincialis var. producta Coen, 1933
- Conus galloprovincialis var. turrita Coen, 1933
- Conus glaucescens G. B. Sowerby I, 1834
- Conus grossii Maravigna, 1853 (synonym)
- Conus guestieri Lorois, 1860
- Conus hanleyi G. B. Sowerby II, 1857 Conus hanley AZRC 547-34a Conus hanley AZRC 548-34b
- Conus herillus Nardo, 1847
- Conus humilis von Salis Marschlins, 1793
- Conus ignobilis Olivi, 1792 (synonym)
- Conus ignobilis var. rufa Scacchi, 1836
- Conus inaequalis Reeve, 1849
- Conus intermedius Lamarck, 1810 - fossil
- Conus istriensis Nardo, 1847
- Conus jamaicensis Hwass in Bruguière, 1792
- Conus jaspis Salis Marschlins, 1793 (synonym)
- Conus listeri Renier, 1804 (unavailable name: published in a work placed on the Official Index of Invalid and Rejected Specific Names in Zoology by ICZN Opinion 316)
- Conus madurensis Hwass in Bruguière, 1792
- Conus mediterraneus Hwass in Bruguière, 1792
- Conus mediterraneus f. gaudiosus Nicolay, 1978 (unavailable name: established as a "form" after 1960)
- Conus mediterraneus var. acuta Requien, 1848
- Conus mediterraneus var. alalmus de Gregorio, 1885
- Conus mediterraneus var. alba Coen, 1933 (invalid: junior homonym of Conus virgo alba Spalowsky, 1795)
- Conus mediterraneus var. albina Bucquoy, Dautzenberg & Dollfus, 1882
- Conus mediterraneus var. alticonica Pallary, 1904 (synonym)
- Conus mediterraneus var. amigus de Gregorio, 1885
- Conus mediterraneus var. arenaria Monterosato, 1917
- Conus mediterraneus var. ater Philippi, 1836
- Conus mediterraneus var. atra Philippi, 1844
- Conus mediterraneus var. caerulescens Bucquoy, Dautzenberg & Dollfus, 1883
- Conus mediterraneus var. carinata Bucquoy, Dautzenberg & Dollfus, 1884 (invalid: junior homonym of Conus carinatus Swainson, 1822)
- Conus mediterraneus var. castanea Coen, 1933
- Conus mediterraneus var. debilis Monterosato, 1917
- Conus mediterraneus var. elongata Bucquoy, Dautzenberg & Dollfus, 1885
- Conus mediterraneus var. emisus de Gregorio, 1885
- Conus mediterraneus var. fasciata Requien, 1848 (invalid: junior homonym of Conus fasciatus Schröter, 1803, and several others)
- Conus mediterraneus var. flammulata Bucquoy, Dautzenberg & Dollfus, 1882
- Conus mediterraneus var. flavescens Coen, 1933 (invalid: junior homonym of Conus flavescens G.B. Sowerby I, 1834)
- Conus mediterraneus var. fusca Bucquoy, Dautzenberg & Dollfus, 1882
- Conus mediterraneus var. interrupta Coen, 1933 (invalid: junior homonym of Conus interruptus Wood, 1828)
- Conus mediterraneus var. lutea Bucquoy, Dautzenberg & Dollfus, 1882 (invalid: junior homonym of Conus luteus G.B. Sowerby I, 1833)
- Conus mediterraneus var. major Bucquoy, Dautzenberg & Dollfus, 1882
- Conus mediterraneus var. marmoratus Philippi, 1836 (invalid: junior homonym of Conus marmoratus Holten, 1802)
- Conus mediterraneus var. minor Monterosato, 1878
- Conus mediterraneus var. oblonga Bucquoy, Dautzenberg & Dollfus, 1882
- Conus mediterraneus var. obtusa Requien, 1848
- Conus mediterraneus var. pallida Bucquoy, Dautzenberg & Dollfus, 1882
- Conus mediterraneus var. persistens Kobelt, 1906
- Conus mediterraneus var. pretunculus Monterosato, 1917
- Conus mediterraneus var. rubens Bucquoy, Dautzenberg & Dollfus, 1882
- Conus mediterraneus var. rufatra de Gregorio, 1885
- Conus mediterraneus var. scalare Dautzenberg, 1911 (invalid: junior homonym of Conus scalaris Valenciennes, 1832)
- Conus mediterraneus var. scalaris Pallary, 1912 (invalid: junior homonym of Conus scalaris Valenciennes, 1832)
- Conus mediterraneus var. subconcolor Requien, 1848
- Conus mediterraneus var. subviridis de Gregorio, 1885
- Conus olivaceus Salis Marschlins, 1793 (synonym)
- Conus olivaceus Kiener, 1850 (invalid: junior homonym of Conus olivaceus Salis, 1793)
- Conus pallans Nardo, 1847
- Conus phegeus Nardo, 1847
- Conus postdiluvianus Risso, 1826
- Conus rusticus Poli, 1826 (invalid: junior homonym of Conus rusticus Linnaeus, 1758)
- Conus siculus Delle Chiaje, 1828
- Conus stercutius Nardo, 1847
- Conus submediterraneus Locard, 1886
- Conus thuscus Nardo, 1847
- Conus trunculus Monterosato, 1899
- Conus vayssierei var. ossea Monterosato, 1917
- Conus ventricosus mediterraneus Hwass in Bruguière, 1792
- Conus ventricosus var. elpus de Gregorio, 1885
- Conus ventricosus var. empismus de Gregorio, 1885
- Conus ventricosus var. pereirae de Gregorio, 1885
- Conus zealandicus Hutton, 1873
- Cucullus annulas Noodt, 1819
- Cucullus glaucus Röding, 1798
- Lautoconus mediterraneus (Hwass in Bruguière, 1792)
- Lautoconus mediterraneus var. noeformis Monterosato, 1923
- Lautoconus ventricosus (Gmelin, 1791)
