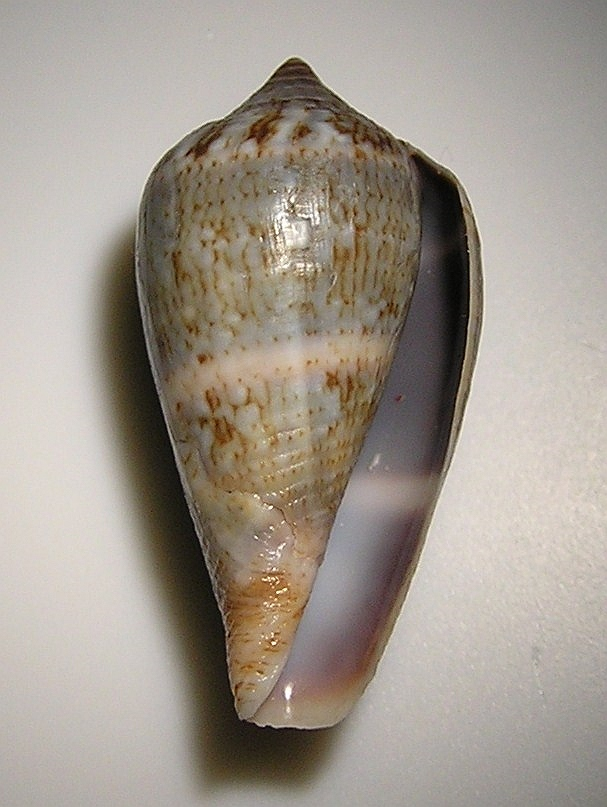
- Apertural view of shell of Conus hybridus (Kiener, 1845).

Scientific classification
- Kingdom: Animalia
- Phylum: Mollusca
- Class: Gastropoda
- Subclass: Caenogastropoda
- Order: Neogastropoda
- Family: Conidae
- Genus: Conus
- Subgenus: Lautoconus; Monterosato, 1923

Type species
- Conus mediterraneus Hwass in Bruguière, 1792

Synonyms
- Africonus Petuch, 1975; Lautoconus Monterosato, 1923; Varioconus da Motta, 1991

= Conus (Lautoconus) =

Subgenus of gastropods

Lautoconus is a subgenus of sea snails, marine gastropod molluscs in the genus Conus, family Conidae, the cone snails and their allies.

In the latest classification of the family Conidae by Puillandre N., Duda T.F., Meyer C., Olivera B.M. & Bouchet P. (2015), Lautoconus has become a subgenus of Conus as Conus (Lautoconus) Monterosato, 1923(type species: Conus mediterraneus Hwass in Bruguière, 1792) represented as Conus Linnaeus, 1758

== Distinguishing characteristics ==
The Tucker & Tenorio 2009 taxonomy distinguishes Lautoconus from Conus in the following ways:

- Genus Conus sensu stricto Linnaeus, 1758

Shell characters (living and fossil species)

The basic shell shape is conical to elongated conical, has a deep anal notch on the shoulder, a smooth periostracum and a small operculum. The shoulder of the shell is usually nodulose and the protoconch is usually multispiral. Markings often include the presence of tents except for black or white color variants, with the absence of spiral lines of minute tents and textile bars.

Radular tooth (not known for fossil species)

The radula has an elongated anterior section with serrations and a large exposed terminating cusp, a non-obvious waist, blade is either small or absent and has a short barb, and lacks a basal spur.

Geographical distribution

These species are found in the Indo-Pacific region.

Feeding habits

These species eat other gastropods including cones.

- Subgenus Lautoconus Monterosato, 1923

Shell characters (living and fossil species)

The shell is turgid in shape with convex sides. The protoconch is paucispiral. The whorl tops are ornamented with cords that reach the middle spire whorls and often persist. The anal notch is shallow to moderate in depth. The periostracum is smooth and thin, and the operculum is of moderate size.

Radular tooth (not known for fossil species)

The anterior section of the radular tooth is equal to shorter than the posterior section, and blade is long and covers most of the anterior section. A basal spur is present, and the barb is short. The radular tooth has serrations in one or two rows.

Geographical distribution

The species in this genus occur in the occur in the West African and Mediterranean regions..

Feeding habits

These cone snails are vermivorous, meaning that the cones prey on polychaete worms.

== Species list ==
This list of species is based on the information in the World Register of Marine Species (WoRMS) list. Species within the genus Lautoconus include:

- Lautoconus aemulus Reeve, 1844: synonym of Conus (Lautoconus) aemulus Reeve, 1844, represented as Conus aemulus Reeve, 1844
- Lautoconus africanus Kiener, 1848: synonym of Conus (Lautoconus) africanus Kiener, 1848, represented as Conus africanus Kiener, 1848
- Lautoconus albuquerquei Trovão, 1978: synonym of Conus (Lautoconus) albuquerquei Trovão, 1978, represented as Conus albuquerquei Trovão, 1978
- Lautoconus alexandrinus Kaicher, 1977: synonym of Conus (Lautoconus) alexandrinus Kaicher, 1977, represented as Conus alexandrinus Kaicher, 1977
- Lautoconus belairensis (Pin & Leung Tack in Pin, 1989) : synonym of Conus belairensis Pin & Leung Tack in Pin, 1989
- Lautoconus bruguieri (Kiener, 1848) : synonym of Conus bruguieri Kiener, 1848
- Lautoconus cacao (Ferrario, 1983) : synonym of Conus cacao Ferrario, 1983
- Lautoconus cloveri (Walls, 1978) : synonym of Conus cloveri Walls, 1978
- Lautoconus desidiosus (A. Adams, 1853): synonym of Conus desidiosus A. Adams, 1853
- Lautoconus dorotheae (Monnier & Limpalaër, 2010): synonym of Conus (Lautoconus) dorotheae Monnier & Limpalaër, 2010 represented as Conus dorotheae Monnier & Limpalaër, 2010
- Lautoconus echinophilus (Petuch, 1975) : synonym of Conus echinophilus (Petuch, 1975)
- Lautoconus guanche (Lauer, 1993) : synonym of Conus guanche Lauer, 1993
- Lautoconus guinaicus (Hwass in Bruguière, 1792) : synonym of Conus guinaicus Hwass in Bruguière, 1792
- Lautoconus hybridus (Kiener, 1845) : synonym of Conus hybridus Kiener, 1845
- Lautoconus mediterraneus (Hwass in Bruguière, 1792): synonym of Conus ventricosus Gmelin, 1791
- Lautoconus mercator (Linnaeus, 1758) : synonym of Conus mercator Linnaeus, 1758
- Lautoconus pineaui (Pin & Leung Tack, 1989) : synonym of Conus pineaui Pin & Leung Tack, 1989
- Lautoconus tacomae (Boyer & Pelorce, 2009) : synonym of Conus tacomae Boyer & Pelorce, 2009
- Lautoconus taslei (Kiener, 1850) : synonym of Conus taslei Kiener, 1850
- Lautoconus trencarti (Nolf & Verstraeten, 2008) : synonym of Conus trencarti Nolf & Verstraeten, 2008
- Lautoconus unifasciatus (Kiener, 1850) : synonym of Conus unifasciatus Kiener, 1850
- Lautoconus vayssierei (Pallary, 1906) : synonym of Conus vayssierei Pallary, 1906
- Lautoconus ventricosus (Gmelin, 1791) : synonym of Conus ventricosus Gmelin, 1791
