= List of animals named cone snail =

Cone snail is a generic term referring to a number of different genera and families of sea snails with conical shells.

== Genera ==
- Conus, a large genus of small to large predatory sea snails, marine gastropod molluscs
- Californiconus, a genus of sea snails, marine gastropod mollusks
- Profundiconus, a genus of sea snails, marine gastropod mollusks in the family Conidae
- Conasprella, a genus of sea snails, marine gastropod mollusks in the family Conidae
- Telescopium (gastropod), a genus of sea snails, marine gastropod mollusks in the family Potamididae

== Families ==
- Conidae, a taxonomic grouping of predatory sea snails, marine gastropod molluscs in the superfamily Conoidea
- Coninae, a taxonomic group of small to large predatory sea snails with cone-shaped shells, marine gastropod mollusks in the superfamily Conoidea
