= Guanche =

Guanche may refer to:

- Guanches, the indigenous people of the Canary Islands
- Guanche language, an extinct language, spoken by the Guanches until the 16th or 17th century
- Conus guanche, a sea snail of family Conidae
