= C. africanus =

C. africanus may refer to:

- Conus africanus, the African cone, a predatory sea snail species
- Canis africanus, a synonym for Xenocyon lycaonoides, an extinct mammal species
- Chamaeleo africanus, the African chameleon

== See also ==
- Africanus (disambiguation)
