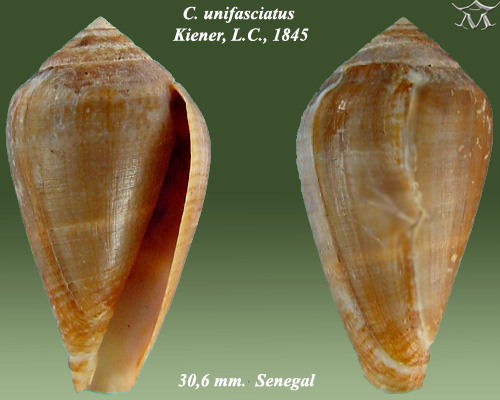
- Apertural and abapertural views of shell of Conus unifasciatus Kiener, L.C., 1845
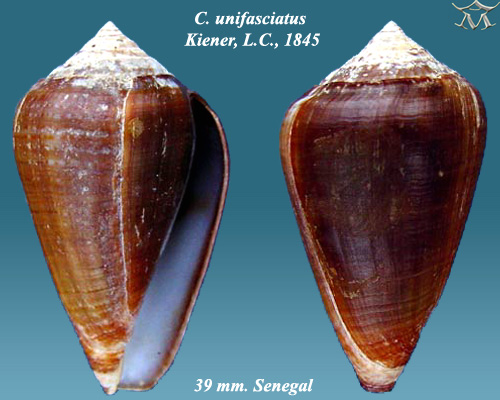

Conservation status
- Endangered (IUCN 3.1)

Scientific classification
- Domain: Eukaryota
- Kingdom: Animalia
- Phylum: Mollusca
- Class: Gastropoda
- Subclass: Caenogastropoda
- Order: Neogastropoda
- Superfamily: Conoidea
- Family: Conidae
- Genus: Conus
- Species: C. unifasciatus

Binomial name
- Conus unifasciatus Kiener, 1845

Synonyms
- Conus (Lautoconus) unifasciatus Kiener, 1850 · accepted, alternate representation; Lautoconus unifasciatus (Kiener, 1850)

= Conus unifasciatus =

Species of sea snail

Conus unifasciatus is a species of sea snail, a marine gastropod mollusk in the family Conidae, the cone snails and their allies.

Like all species within the genus Conus, these snails are predatory and venomous. They are capable of stinging humans, therefore live ones should be handled carefully or not at all.

== Description ==
The size of the shell varies between 22 mm and 37 mm. The shell has the general form of Californiconus californicus. Its color is chocolate, with a rather broad yellowish brown band just below the shoulder.

== Distribution ==
This species occurs in the Atlantic Ocean off West Africa and Senegal.
