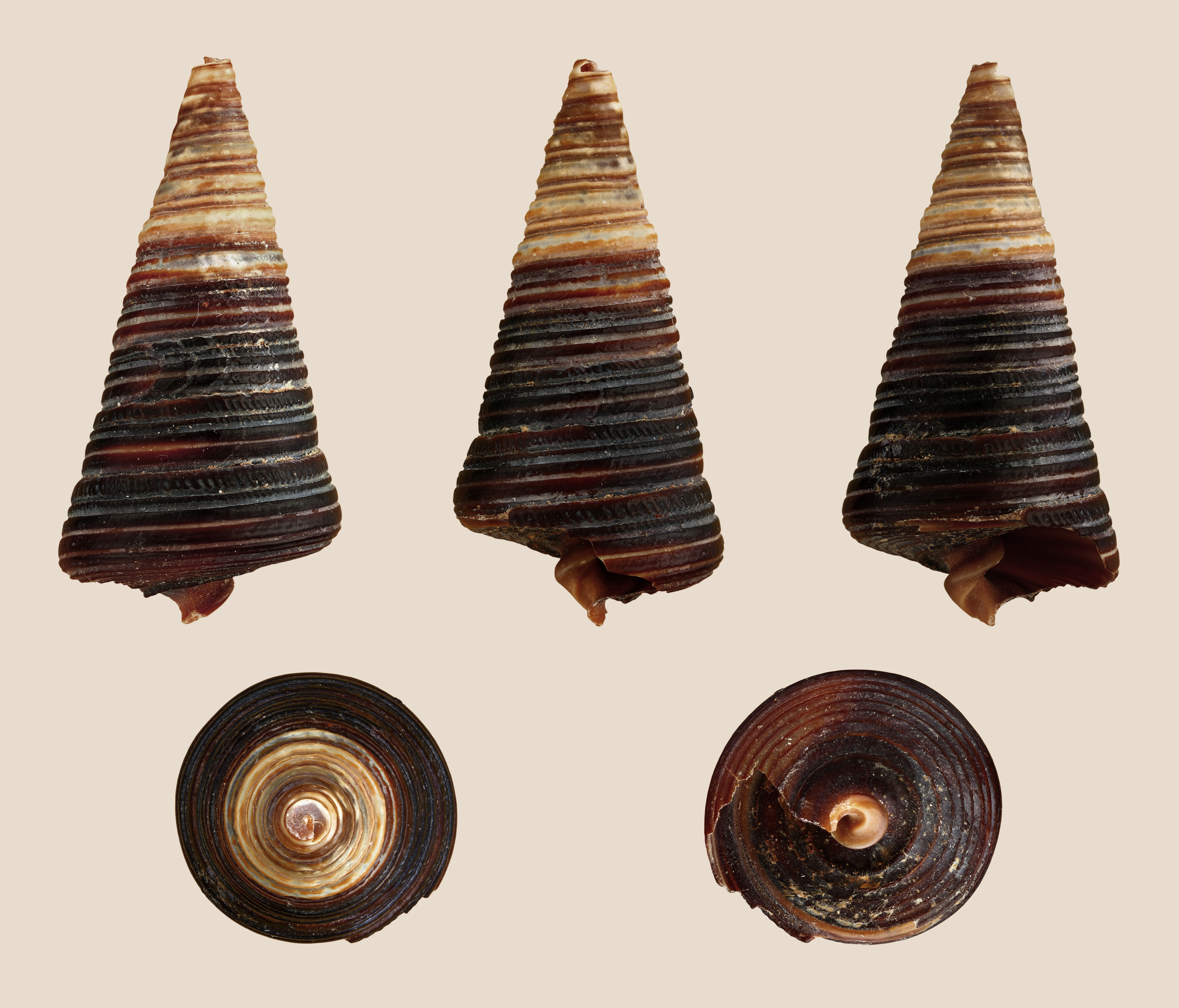
- Five views of a shell of Telescopium telescopium

Scientific classification
- Kingdom: Animalia
- Phylum: Mollusca
- Class: Gastropoda
- Subclass: Caenogastropoda
- Order: incertae sedis
- Family: Potamididae
- Genus: Telescopium
- Species: T. telescopium

Binomial name
- Telescopium telescopium (Linnaeus, 1758)

Synonyms
- Cerithium telescopium (Linnaeus, 1758) (superseded combination); Potamides telescopium Linnaeus, 1758; Telescopium indicator Montfort, 1810 (junior synonym); Telescopium mauritsi Butot, 1954 (junior synonym); Trochus telescopium Linnaeus, 1758 (original combination)

= Telescopium telescopium =

Species of gastropod

Telescopium telescopium, commonly known as the telescope snail, is a species of snail in the horn snail family Potamididae found in mangrove habitats in the Indo-Pacific. They are large snails that can grow up to 8 to 10 cm (3.1 to 3.9 in) in length and are easily recognizable by their cone-shaped shell.

Telescope snails are edible and are eaten in parts of Southeast Asia. They are known locally as bagongon or bagungon in the Philippines; and rodong or berongan in Malaysia, Singapore, and Indonesia.

== Description ==
Telescopium telescopium are very similar in description to many other Potamidiae gastropods with the main points of difference being it being the largest in the family and the fold on its columella.

Telescopium telescopium are relatively large in comparison to other molluscs in the Potamidiae family having a shell that ranges from 8–13 cm when fully grown. The shell is thick and heavy relative to the snail itself. The opening of the shell is perpendicular to the shell's longitudinal axis, creating the straight sided cone shape. The shell of Telescopium telescopium differs from most other gastropods because it contains 0.12% magnesium carbonate. The operculum is rigiclaudent, meaning that the last growth increment always lies tangentially against the labial lip of the previous whorl. This makes it an exception within the family Potamididae, where the opercula of the shells are flexicaudent.

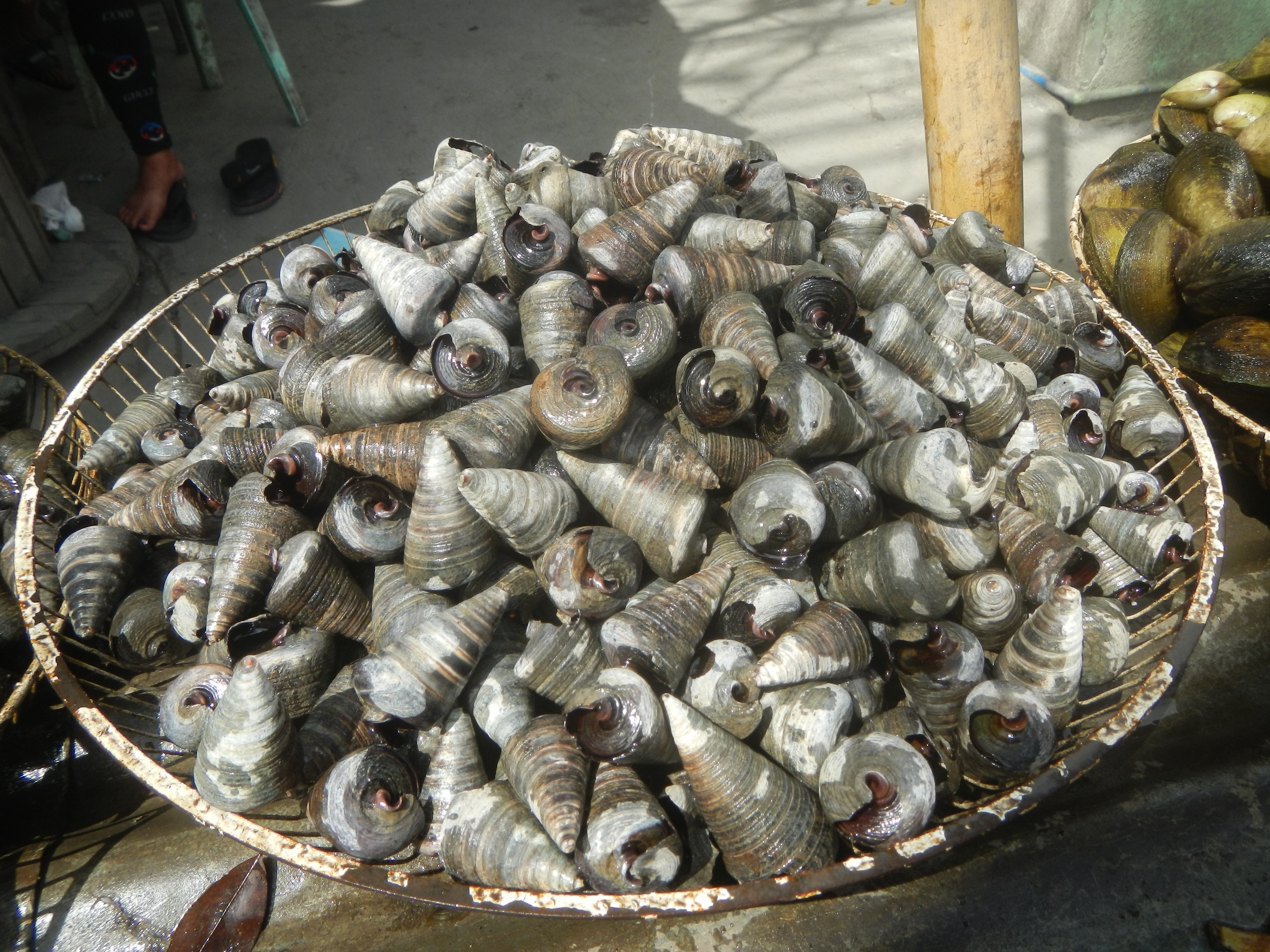
Telescope snails (locally known as bagongon) sold at a market in Bulacan, Philippines

Telescopium telescopium shells are either black or very dark reddish brown. They also have a fold on the columella of their shells, which makes them the only gastropod in the Potamidiae family to have so. Despite the obvious colour of the shell they are often covered in barnacles and mud obscuring the natural colour of the it.

Telescopium telescopium outside of the shell have a black exterior with a long proboscis. It also has three eyes, one on its shell boundary and two near its proboscis protrusion.

Telescopium telescopium respiratory system works in the same way to other semi-tidal gastropods in that it gets oxygen from water passing over small gills located on the inside of its shell. When the tide goes back out, the Telescopium telescopium will withdraw into its shell, reserving energy and oxygen until the ebb tide phase returns where they become active again.

Telescopium telescopium are able to store saved oxygen for at least 36 hours and up to 48 hours before dying.

Telescopium telescopium digestive system starts at its proboscis. It uses this to collect nutrient rich organic matter where it then passes down the oesophagus and then the stomach.

The Telescopium telescopium has a large stomach and has two components associated with it before it passes into the digestive caecum. The main part of the stomach has a sac off to the side that contains a rod of concentrated digestive enzymes that break down the algae and other organic matter that pass through it.

Telescopium telescopium, like all members of the Gastropod species, move using the single foot protruding from the aperture of its shell. It does this through a series of muscle contraction waves that extend along the lower surface of the foot propelling the mollusc forward. The foot also excretes a substance, known as pedal mucus, with adhesive properties that allow for Telescopium telescopium to move on inverted services overcoming the force of gravity that they would fall because of otherwise. Pedal mucus is what allows Telescopium telescopium to stay during the high tide phase of mangrove foreshores.

== Distribution and habitat ==
Mangrove forests along the Indo-Western Pacific, and the Indian Ocean islands of Madagascar and Réunion, are the Telescopium telescopium's natural environment. More specifically, they are concentrated underneath the muddy surface of mangrove foreshores. and on mud-flats only just covered at high tide, occasionally wandering even beyond tide-mark range.

Globally, the decrease in population of Telescopium telescopium due to loss of habitat as a result of marine pollution and mangrove deforestation.

This Mangrove favoured habitat explains the distribution of the Telescopium telescopium throughout the world. Currently known dwellings include the mangrove regions of:

- Goa, India
- Chantaburi Prov., SE Thailand
- Panglao, Philippines
- Queensland, Australia
- Northern Territory, Australia
- Western Australia
- Singapore
- Madagascar
- Réunion Island
- Cambodia
- Indonesia
- Iran
- Malaysia
- Vietnam
- Papua New Guinea

== Lifecycle ==
Telescopium telescopium reproduce through fertilisation of eggs external to the body. The male Telescopium telescopium does not have a penis, it instead excretes sperm in packages through an opening over eggs that have been deposited by the female. Females deposit their eggs from an opening on the right side of their foot. Gestation is still relatively unknown.

Offspring hatch as small larvae in the water that feed on phytoplankton. Prior to becoming fully grown adults, they first develop from larvae to juvenile veligers.

During development, the Telescopium telescopium grows in length between 50 and 40mm each year until adult size is met.

The lifespan of Telescopium telescopium can reach as far as 4 years.

== Ecology ==
Telescopium telescopium are detritivores. Mangrove forest floors is where Telescopium telescopium predominately acquire their nutrients to function, where they feed on the rich decomposed organic matter that is left behind during the ebb tide phase of tidal movements and surface algae. They also only scavenge for food when covered completely or partially with just their shell tips exposed as a means of protection against heat, desiccation, and predators.

Telescopium telescopium feed on mangrove sediment and mangrove leaves to get important bacteria that are needed to function. These include: Bacillus cereus, Pseudomonas aeruginosa, Bacillus sphaericcus, Staphycococcus aureus, Pseudomonas aeruginosa, and Staphylococcus aureus.

Telescopium telescopium are not a threat to humans.

In addition to deforestation and marine pollution, micro-plastics have become a big threat to Telescopium telescopium. A study was undertaken to examine the effects on Telescopium telescopium and the results showed a correlation between an increase in mass and level of ingested micro-plastics in the digestive organ, and inhaled in the respiratory system. The most common type of micro-plastic found in the Telescopium telescopium was film. This was followed by fibre, and finally fragment.

== Human Uses ==
Telescopium telescopium have begun to be used as bio monitors of Cu, Zn, and Pb in tropical intertidal regions. Components of the molluscs' soft tissue and their shells accumulate amounts of trace metals when exposed to them over their lifetime. It is these accumulated concentrations that are used as bio monitors.

The main components used of the Telescopium telescopium are commonly the digestive caecum and the shell. The shell is used as a Pb bio-monitor as it accumulates more lead than any soft tissue. The digestive caecum is used as a Zn bio-monitor as it accumulates more zinc than any other component. The following soft tissue can also be used as bio-monitors for Cu, Zn, and Pb.

- Foot
- Cephalic tentacle
- Mantle
- Muscle
- Gills

The Telescopium telescopium was again used as a bio monitor in 2013 for Darwin. It was used to detect levels of Nitrogen and Carbon stable isotopes present in the cities sewage. The trial proved to be a success as results highlighted a strong correlation between Nitrogen and Carbon Isotopes present in the Telescopium telescopium tissue, and the sediment samples taken from where they were dwelling.

The Telescopium telescopium was used in India, in 2010, as biomonitor for Fe, Mg, Zn, and Cu. The readings of the heavy metals in the Telescopium telescopium's tissue and shell corresponded to the recordings taken of the sediment, leading to the Veller Estuary region of south east India developing new ways to reduce pollution.

Telescopium telescopium are considered traditional foods in regions of Southeast Asia and more specifically Singapore. Before consumption it is required to be steamed and is often accompanied with chilli.

Telescopium telescopium are the only known species of Potamidiae that are eaten by Aborigines, although are seen more as a delicacy due to the rarity of them. This is done by either light roasting, steaming, or boiling before consumption. They were often known as "poor man's tucker" to the people living around the coastal regions of the Northern Territory due to broad range of shellfish available to them that were considered more of a delicacy.

When eaten, Telescopium telescopium have little protein content and have a peppery taste.

Before eating, in all regions, the shell is broken at the spire to stop explosion of the shell due to pressure build up. The insides then fall away from the shell after cooking, or a stick can be used to reach tissue that sticks to the inside of the shell.

Telescopium telescopium are sometimes also used as bait and the shells can be used to make lime.

Studies have been undertaken that suggest Telescopium telescopium tissue, when ingested, can act as central nervous system depressants. This study is still under investigation as tests have not yet passed in-vivo tests taken on rodents, however, all rodents that consumed Telescopium telescopium tissue demonstrated the symptoms associated with central nervous system depressants.

Preliminary studies have been undertaken on Ammonium Sulfate protein (SF-50), a protein that is excreted from the spermatheca gland of Telescopium telescopium. Although only in-vitro tests have been conducted, the Ammonium Sulfate protein SF-50 has shown to have an agglutinating and spermicidal effect on microbes and sperm cells in humans, leading to the potential for the substance to be used as an anti-microbe rub or spermicide in the future.

Telescopium telescopium are also used in the synthesis of some asthma medications.

Trials have been conducted on the use of crushed up Telescopium telescopium shell powder as an adsorbent to reduce copper ions in synthetic waste water. The trials proved that the shell powder was possible and could be used as a low cost substitute to other adsorbents.
