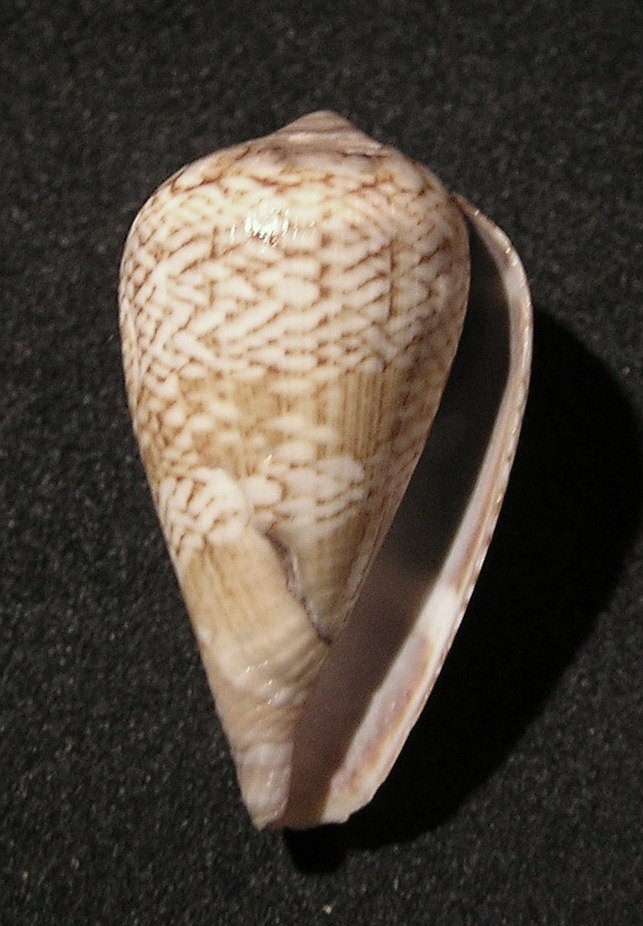
- Apertural view of a shell of Conus cacao

Conservation status
- Vulnerable (IUCN 3.1)

Scientific classification
- Kingdom: Animalia
- Phylum: Mollusca
- Class: Gastropoda
- Subclass: Caenogastropoda
- Order: Neogastropoda
- Superfamily: Conoidea
- Family: Conidae
- Genus: Conus
- Species: C. cacao

Binomial name
- Conus cacao Ferrario, 1983

Synonyms
- Conus (Lautoconus) cacao Ferrario, 1983 · accepted, alternate representation; Lautoconus cacao Ferrario, M., 1983

= Conus cacao =

Species of sea snail

Conus cacao is a species of sea snail, a marine gastropod mollusk in the family Conidae, the cone snails and their allies.

Like all species within the genus Conus, these snails are predatory and venomous. They are capable of stinging humans, therefore live ones should be handled carefully or not at all.

== Distribution and description ==
Conus cacao is a species of sea snail within the family Conidae. It is commonly known as cone snails. The adult shell size varies between 22 mm and 55 mm. It is found in the Atlantic Ocean off the coast of Senegal and in the Mediterranean Sea.

Like other cone snails, they inhabit marine environments. They prefer to hide beneath the rocks in small groups. They also partially bury themselves in clean and white sand. In this environment, they are able to hide themselves from various predators. They are also able to look for prey in this habitat.

Conus cacao faces threats from habitat loss and pollution. There is a need for conservation efforts to protect this marine species.
