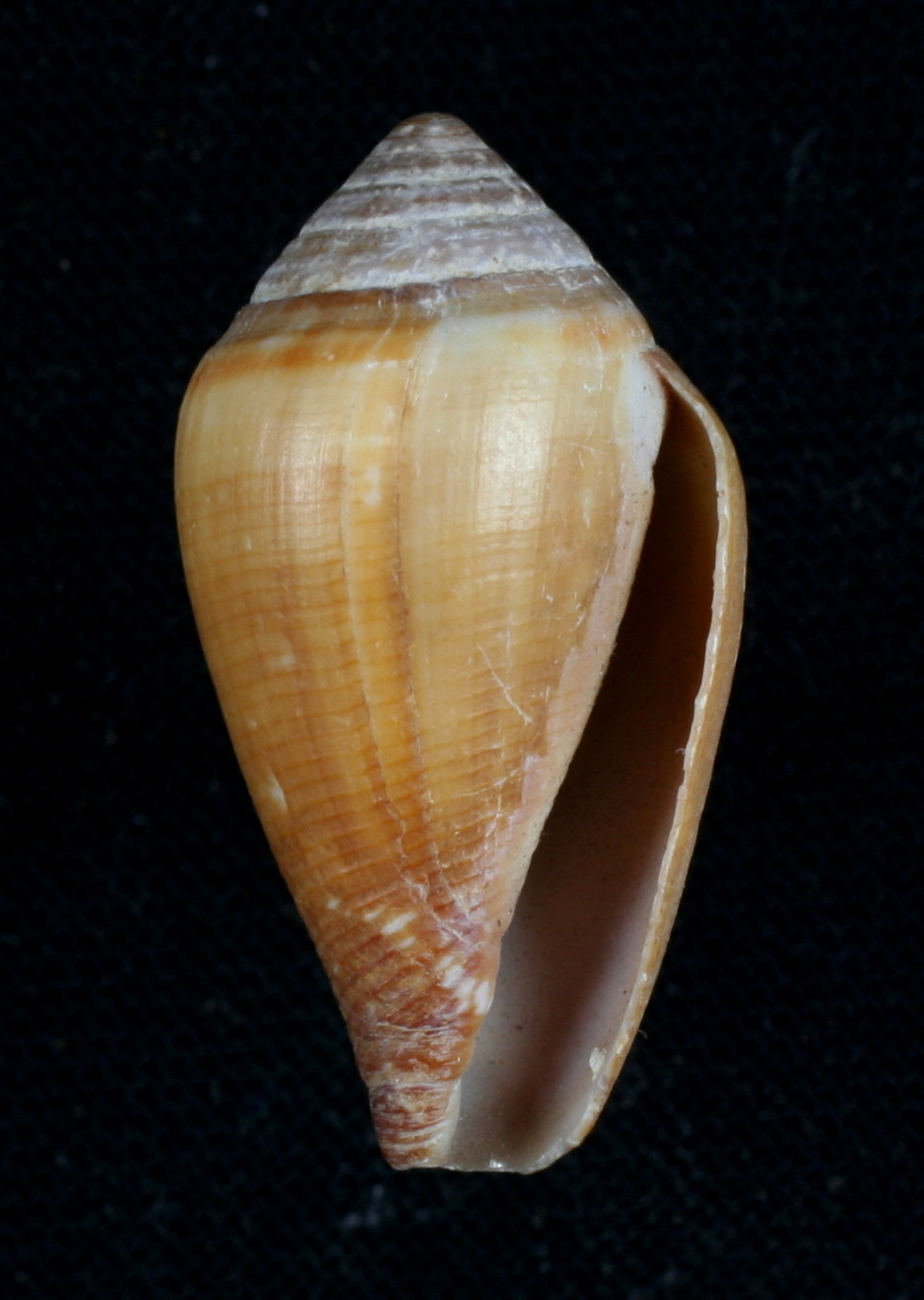
- Apertural view of shell of Californiconus californicus (Hinds in Reeve, 1844), measuring 29.1 mm in height, collected at low tide in Huntington Beach, California.

Conservation status
- Least Concern (IUCN 3.1)

Scientific classification
- Kingdom: Animalia
- Phylum: Mollusca
- Class: Gastropoda
- Subclass: Caenogastropoda
- Order: Neogastropoda
- Superfamily: Conoidea
- Family: Conidae
- Genus: Californiconus
- Species: C. californicus

Binomial name
- Californiconus californicus (Hinds in Reeve, 1844)

Synonyms
- Conus californicus Reeve, 1844; † Conus californicus fossilis Oldroyd, 1921; Conus ravus Gould, 1853

= Californiconus californicus =

Species of gastropod

Californiconus californicus, commonly called the Californian cone, is a species of small, predatory sea snail in the family Conidae, the cone snails.

As both the scientific and common names suggest, this cone is found along the Californian coast.

== Distribution and habitat ==
This small cone snail is unusual, in that most cone snail species are tropical, whereas this species lives in the cooler, temperate waters of the eastern Pacific Ocean, including most of the coast of California. The range of this species is from the Farallon Islands near San Francisco to Bahía Magdalena, in Baja California Sur, Mexico.

This cone is found in both rocky and sandy areas, in the intertidal zone, and subtidally down to 30 meters depth.

== Shell description ==
This shell is distinguished by its grayish-brown color and thick periostracum. It is round-shouldered with the aperture broader at the base. The spire is flat-sided, and the height of the shell ranges from 25–40 mm.

== Feeding habits ==
The California cone hunts and eats marine worms, fish, and other mollusks. It is also a scavenger.

== Gallery ==
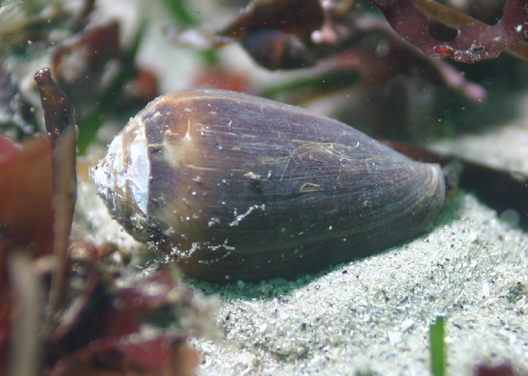
A live individual of the California cone, Californiconus californicus, anterior end towards the right

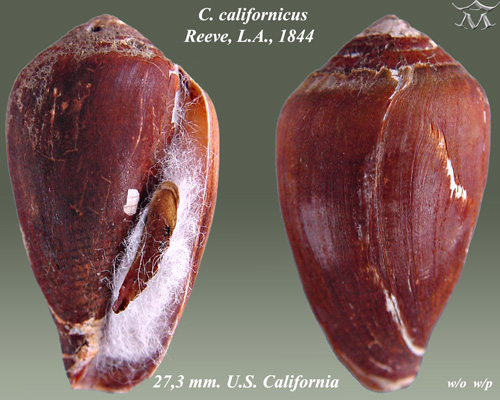
Californiconus californicus Reeve, L.A., 1844

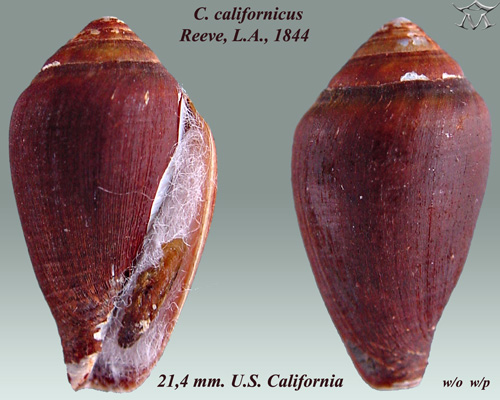
Californiconus californicus Reeve, L.A., 1844

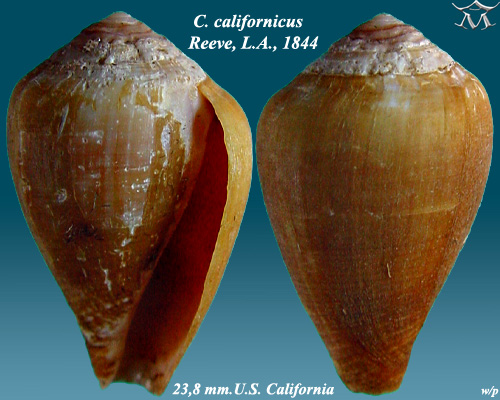
Californiconus californicus Reeve, L.A., 1844

== Fossil record ==
Fossils of Californiconus californicus have been recovered from the Late Pleistocene strata of Isla Vista, California.
