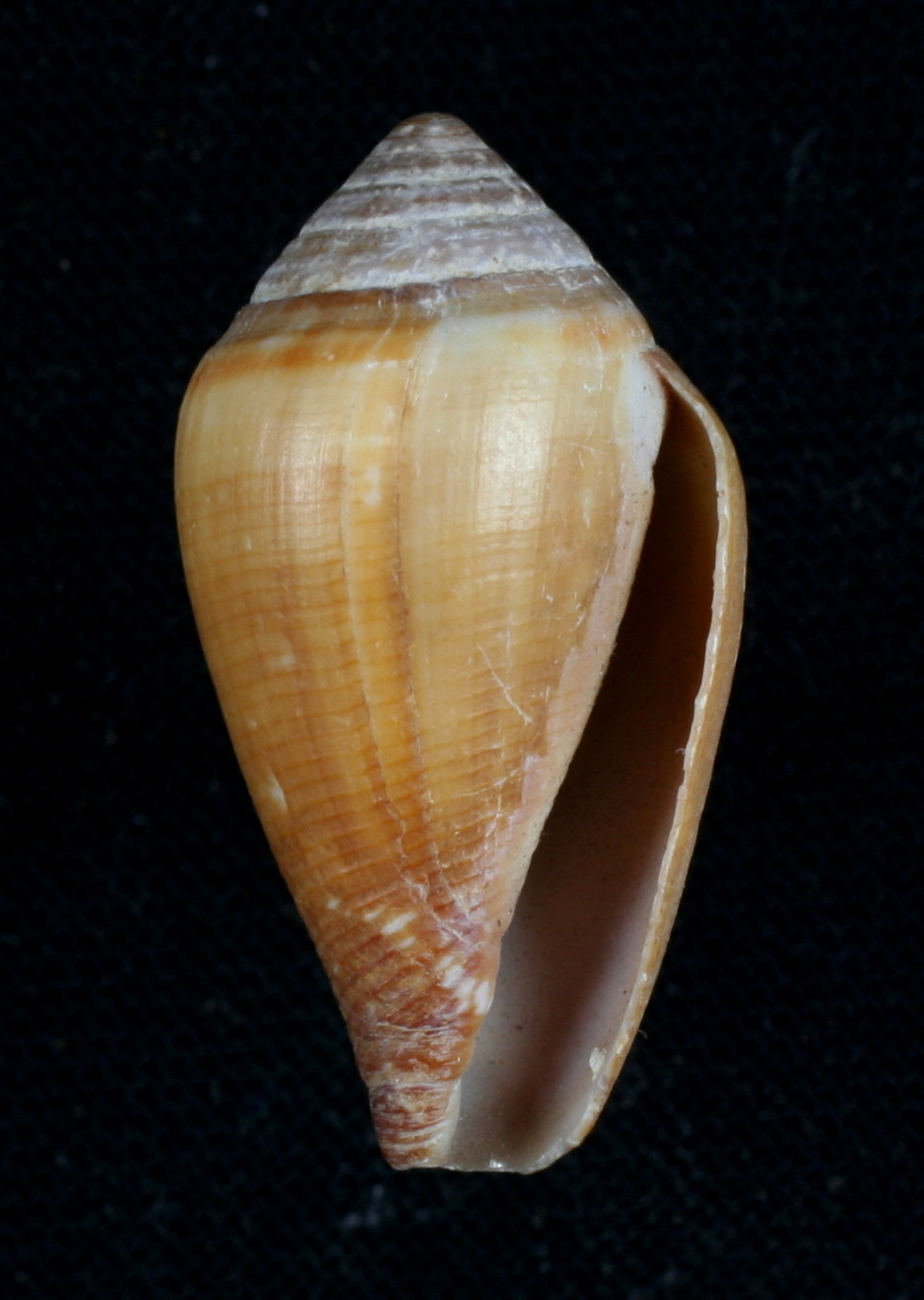
- Apertural view of shell of Californiconus californicus (Reeve, 1844), measuring 29.1 mm in height, collected at low tide in Huntington Beach, California

Scientific classification
- Kingdom: Animalia
- Phylum: Mollusca
- Class: Gastropoda
- Subclass: Caenogastropoda
- Order: Neogastropoda
- Superfamily: Conoidea
- Family: Conidae
- Genus: Californiconus; Tucker & Tenorio, 2009

Type species
- Conus californicus Reeve, 1844

= Californiconus =

Californiconus Temporal range: Eocene–Recent

Genus of gastropods

Californiconus is a genus of sea snails, marine gastropod mollusks. The experts at WoRMS place this group of species in the family Conidae, the cone snails, but some other experts placed previously the genus in a proposed family, the Conilithidae. This is a monotypic genus.

Use of this genus in the binomial name of this species was, until 2015, treated by the experts at WoRMS as an "alternative representation" of the species. (When the "alternative representation" was not used, this species was still placed in the Linnaean genus Conus.)

In 2015 Puillandre et al. placed Conus californicus as the sole member of its own genus as Californiconus californicus This species has always been considered a species with unique characteristics within Conidae, because it shows diverging molecular (including toxicological) and morphological characteristics. Its generalist diet includes fish, other molluscs and worms, contrary to what is the case in other cone snail species, which have more specialized diets.

== Distinguishing characteristics ==
The Tucker & Tenorio taxonomy distinguishes Californiconus from Conus in the following ways:

- Genus Conus sensu stricto Linnaeus, 1758

Shell characters (living and fossil species)

The basic shell shape is conical to elongated conical, has a deep anal notch on the shoulder, a smooth periostracum and a small operculum. The shoulder of the shell is usually nodulose and the protoconch is usually multispiral. Markings often include the presence of tents except for black or white color variants, with the absence of spiral lines of minute tents and textile bars.

Radular tooth (not known for fossil species)

The radula has an elongated anterior section with serrations and a large exposed terminating cusp, a non-obvious waist, blade is either small or absent and has a short barb, and lacks a basal spur.

Geographical distribution

These species are found in the Indo-Pacific region.

Feeding habits

These species eat other gastropods, including cones.

- Genus Californiconus Tucker & Tenorio, 2009

Shell characters (living and fossil species)

The protoconch is multispiral, the shell is turgid in profile, short, squat and rounded. The shell may be sculpted with spiral lines, but can be relatively smooth. The anterior notch is slight or absent, and the anal notch is shallow. The periostracum is smooth, and the operculum is large.

Radular tooth (not known for fossils)

The radular tooth is unique in that it has no basal spur, and the radula has five barbs: three barbs on the underside of the tooth, and two barbs on the topside, with one located near the blade, and the other near the shaft. A blunt shaft fold is located just posterior to the waist. The radular tooth does not have an accessory process.

Geographical distribution

There is one species in this genus, and it is found only in the Eastern-Pacific region.

Feeding habits

These cones are generalists. They are: molluscivorous (they prey on gastropods and bivalves); vermivorous (they prey on polychaete marine worms); and piscivorous (they also prey on fish).

== Species list ==
This list of species is based on the information in the World Register of Marine Species (WoRMS) list. Species within the genus Californiconus include only:

- Californiconus californicus Reeve, 1844

== Significance of "alternative representation" ==
Prior to 2009, all cone species were placed within the family Conidae and were placed in one genus, Conus. In 2009 however, J.K. Tucker and M.J. Tenorio proposed a classification system for the over 600 recognized species that were in the family. Their classification proposed 3 distinct families and 82 genera for the living species of cone snails, including the family Conilithidae. This classification was based upon shell morphology, radular differences, anatomy, physiology, cladistics, with comparisons to molecular (DNA) studies. Published accounts of genera within the Conidae (or Conilithidae) that include the genus Californiconus include J.K. Tucker & M.J. Tenorio (2009), and Bouchet et al. (2011).

Testing in order to try to understand the molecular phylogeny of the Conidae was initially begun by Christopher Meyer and Alan Kohn, and is continuing, particularly with the advent of nuclear DNA testing in addition to mDNA testing.

However, in 2011, some experts still prefer to use the traditional classification, where all species are placed in Conus within the single family Conidae: for example, according to the 2011 version of the World Register of Marine Species, all species within the family Conidae are placed within the genus Conus. The binomial names of species in the 82 cone snail genera listed in Tucker & Tenorio 2009 are recognized by the World Register of Marine Species as "alternative representations." Debate within the scientific community regarding this issue continues, and additional molecular phylogeny studies are being carried out in an attempt to clarify the issue.

This alternative representation for Californiconus californicus is no longer necessary, as in 2015 it was placed in its own genus.
