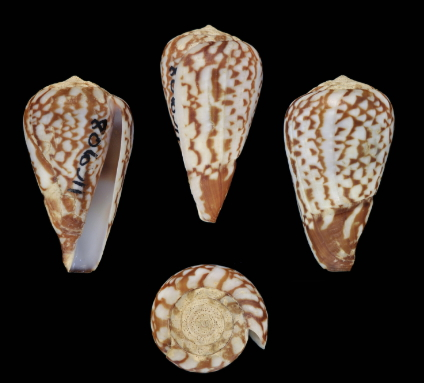
- Shell and protoconch of Conus alexandrinus (lectotype at the Smithsonian Institution)

Scientific classification
- Kingdom: Animalia
- Phylum: Mollusca
- Class: Gastropoda
- Subclass: Caenogastropoda
- Order: Neogastropoda
- Superfamily: Conoidea
- Family: Conidae
- Genus: Conus
- Species: C. alexandrinus

Binomial name
- Conus alexandrinus Kaicher, 1977

Synonyms
- Africonus musivus (Trovão, 1978); Conus (Lautoconus) alexandrinus Kaicher, 1977 · accepted, alternate representation; Conus musivus Trovão, 1975 (invalid: junior homonym of Conus musivum G.B. Sowerby I, 1833; Conus tevesi is a replacement name); Conus tevesi Trovão, 1978; Varioconus alexandrinus (Kaicher, 1977); Varioconus tevesi (Trovão, 1978)

= Conus alexandrinus =

Species of sea snail

Conus alexandrinus is a species of sea snail, a marine gastropod mollusk in the family Conidae, the cone snails, cone shells or cones.

== Description ==
The size of the shell varies between 18 mm and 34 mm.

== Distribution ==
This species occurs in the Atlantic Ocean off Angola.
