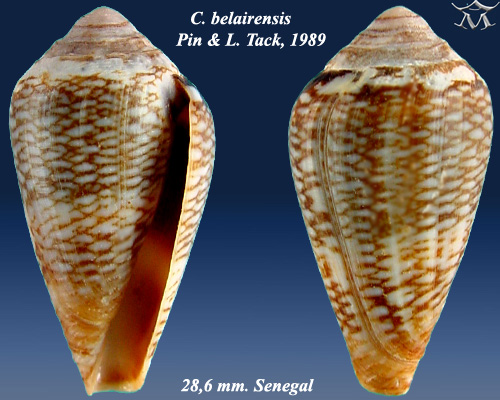
- Apertural and abapertural views of shell of Conus belairensis Pin & L. Tack, 1989
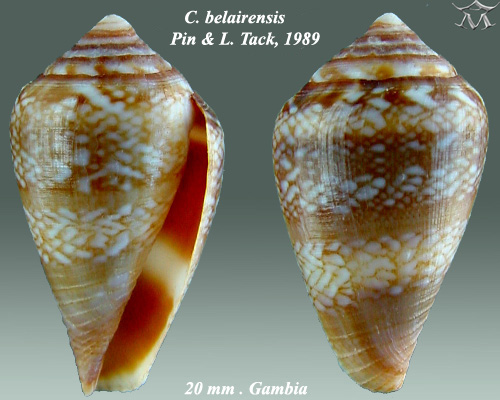

Conservation status
- Endangered (IUCN 3.1)

Scientific classification
- Kingdom: Animalia
- Phylum: Mollusca
- Class: Gastropoda
- Subclass: Caenogastropoda
- Order: Neogastropoda
- Superfamily: Conoidea
- Family: Conidae
- Genus: Conus
- Species: C. belairensis

Binomial name
- Conus belairensis Pin & Leung Tack in Pin, 1989

Synonyms
- Conus (Lautoconus) belairensis Pin & Leung Tack, 1989 · accepted, alternate representation; Lautoconus belairensis (Pin & Leung Tack, 1989)

= Conus belairensis =

Species of sea snail

Conus belairensis is a species of sea snail, a marine gastropod mollusk in the family Conidae, the cone snails and their allies.

Like all species within the genus Conus, these snails are predatory and venomous. They are capable of stinging humans; therefore, live ones should be handled carefully or not at all.

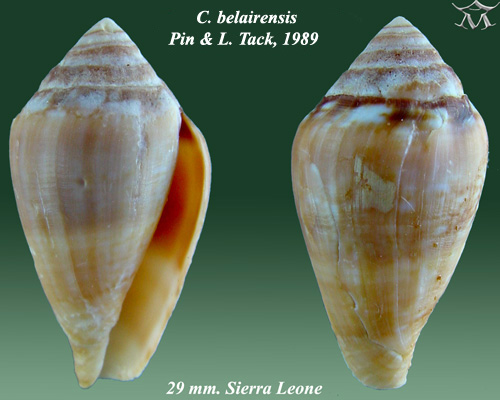
Conus belairensis Pin & L. Tack, 1989

== Description ==
The length of the shell varies between 16 mm and 45 mm.

== Distribution ==
This species occurs in the Atlantic Ocean off Senegal.
