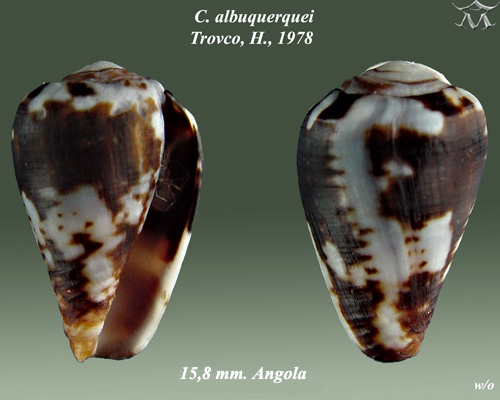
- Apertural and abapertural views of shell of Conus albuquerquei Trovco, H., 1978
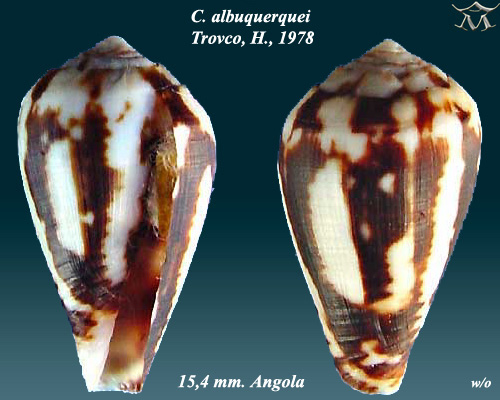

Scientific classification
- Domain: Eukaryota
- Kingdom: Animalia
- Phylum: Mollusca
- Class: Gastropoda
- Subclass: Caenogastropoda
- Order: Neogastropoda
- Superfamily: Conoidea
- Family: Conidae
- Genus: Conus
- Species: C. albuquerquei

Binomial name
- Conus albuquerquei Trovão, 1978

Synonyms
- Conus (Lautoconus) albuquerquei Trovão, 1978 · accepted, alternate representation; Varioconus albuquerquei (Trovão, 1978)

= Conus albuquerquei =

Species of sea snail

Conus albuquerquei is a species of sea snail, a marine gastropod mollusk in the family 'Conidae', the 'cone snails' and their allies. Like all species within the genus Conus, these snails are predatory and venomous. They are capable of stinging humans, therefore live ones should be handled carefully or not at all.

== Description ==
The size of the shell varies between 12 mm and 17 mm.

Their functional group is benthos.

Their feeding type is predatory.

== Distribution ==
This species occurs in the Atlantic Ocean off Angola
