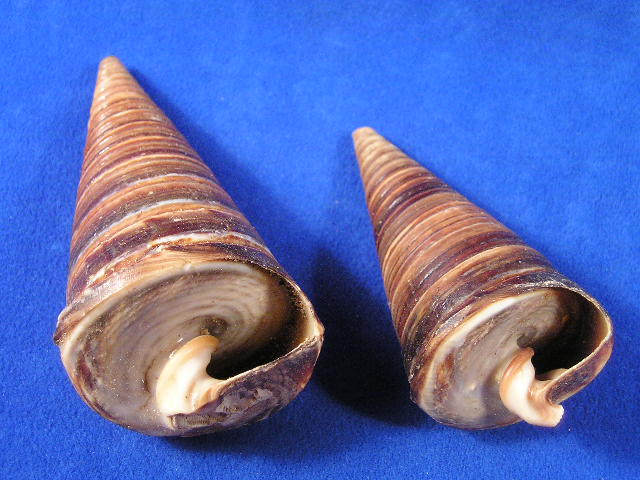

Scientific classification
- Kingdom: Animalia
- Phylum: Mollusca
- Class: Gastropoda
- Subclass: Caenogastropoda
- Order: incertae sedis
- Superfamily: Cerithioidea
- Family: Potamididae
- Genus: Telescopium; Montfort, 1810

= Telescopium (gastropod) =

Telescopium Temporal range: 65.500–0 Ma Paleocene to Holocene

Genus of gastropods

Telescopium is a genus of cone-shaped sea snails in the family Potamididae.

== Species ==
Species within the genus Telescopium include:

- Telescopium telescopium (Linnaeus, 1758)

Species brought into synonymy

- † Telescopium gigas K. Martin, 1881: synonym of † Campanile martini Matsubara, 2009 (invalid: secondary junior homonym of Campanile gigas Leymerie, 1851; C. martini is a replacement name)
- Telescopium indicator Montfort, 1810: synonym of Telescopium telescopium (Linnaeus, 1758) (a junior synonym)
- Telescopium mauritsi Butot, 1954: synonym of Telescopium telescopium (Linnaeus, 1758) (a junior synonym)
