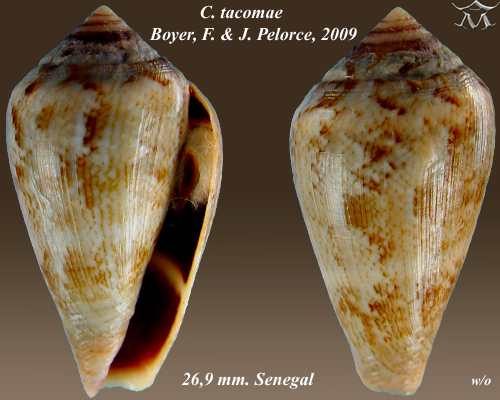
- Apertural and abapertural views of shell of Conus tacomae Boyer, F. & J. Pelorce, 2009

Conservation status
- Vulnerable (IUCN 3.1)

Scientific classification
- Kingdom: Animalia
- Phylum: Mollusca
- Class: Gastropoda
- Subclass: Caenogastropoda
- Order: Neogastropoda
- Superfamily: Conoidea
- Family: Conidae
- Genus: Conus
- Species: C. tacomae

Binomial name
- Conus tacomae Boyer & Pelorce, 2009

Synonyms
- Conus (Lautoconus) tacomae Boyer & Pelorce, 2009 · accepted, alternate representation; Lautoconus tacomae (Boyer & Pelorce, 2009)

= Conus tacomae =

Species of sea snail

Conus tacomae is a species of sea snail, a marine gastropod mollusk in the family Conidae, the cone snails and their allies.

Like all species within the genus Conus, these snails are predatory and venomous. They are capable of stinging humans, therefore live ones should be handled carefully or not at all.

== Description ==
The size of the shell varies between 15 mm and 30 mm.

== Distribution and habitat ==
This marine species is only known to occur at the coast of Senegal, off the island of Gorée, approx 2 km offshore from Dakar. It has been found on rocky coastlines at depths of 0–7 m, and also in sandy pockets at 35–40 m.
