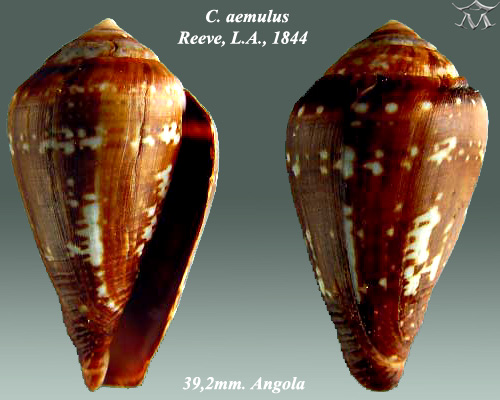
- Apertural and abapertural views of shell of Conus aemulus Reeve, L.A., 1844
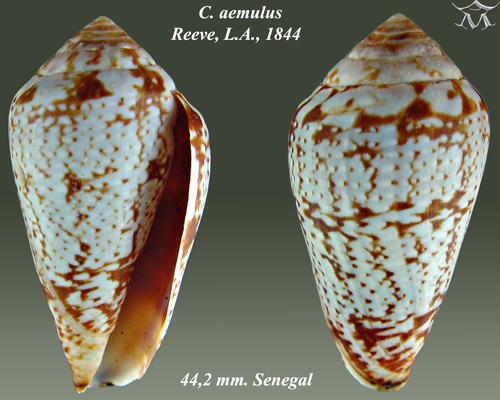

Conservation status
- Least Concern (IUCN 3.1)

Scientific classification
- Kingdom: Animalia
- Phylum: Mollusca
- Class: Gastropoda
- Subclass: Caenogastropoda
- Order: Neogastropoda
- Superfamily: Conoidea
- Family: Conidae
- Genus: Conus
- Species: C. aemulus

Binomial name
- Conus aemulus Reeve, 1844

Synonyms
- Conus (Lautoconus) aemulus Reeve, 1844 · accepted, alternate representation; Conus tamsianus Dunker, 1853; Varioconus aemulus (Reeve, 1844)

= Conus aemulus =

Species of sea snail

Conus aemulus (common name - amber marbled cone snail) is a species of sea snail, a cone snail (family Conidae, genus Conus, subgenus Lautoconus). Amber marbled cone snails are marine gastropod mollusks.

Like all species within the genus Conus, these snails are predatory and venomous. They are capable of stinging humans, therefore live ones should be handled carefully or not at all.

== Description ==
The size of the shell varies between 20 mm and 58 mm.

== Distribution and usage ==
This species occurs in the Atlantic Ocean off Angola, in shallow waters. Their habitat strip is restricted around 40 km long, but they are not endangered, although they may be susceptible to threats of oil pollution, or other pollution from the nearby city of Luanda.

They are sometimes gathered for their shells to be sold, but the market is not large.
