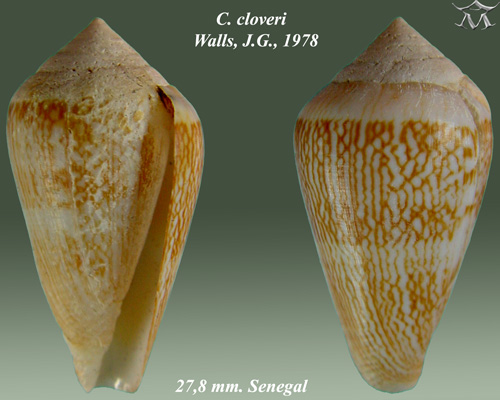
- Apertural and abapertural views of shell of Conus cloveri Walls, J.G., 1978
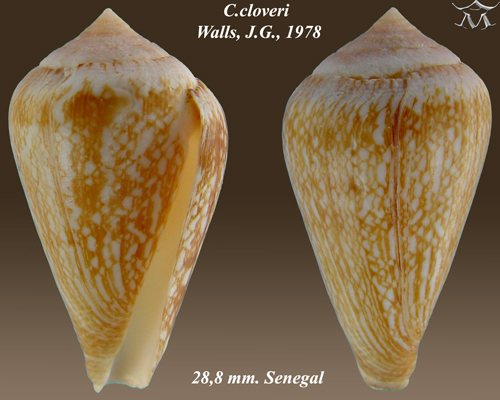

Conservation status
- Endangered (IUCN 3.1)

Scientific classification
- Kingdom: Animalia
- Phylum: Mollusca
- Class: Gastropoda
- Subclass: Caenogastropoda
- Order: Neogastropoda
- Superfamily: Conoidea
- Family: Conidae
- Genus: Conus
- Species: C. cloveri

Binomial name
- Conus cloveri Walls, 1978

Synonyms
- Conus (Lautoconus) cloveri Walls, 1978 · accepted, alternate representation; Conus soaresi Trovão, 1978; Lautoconus cloveri (Walls, 1978)

= Conus cloveri =

Species of sea snail

Conus cloveri is a species of sea snail, a marine gastropod mollusk in the family Conidae, the cone snails and their allies.

Like all species within the genus Conus, these snails are predatory and venomous. They are capable of stinging humans, therefore live ones should be handled carefully or not at all.

== Description ==
The size of the shell varies between 15 mm and 42 mm.

== Distribution ==
This species occurs in the Atlantic Ocean off Senegal.
