= Conus vayssierei =

Scientific classification
- Kingdom: Animalia
- Phylum: Mollusca
- Class: Gastropoda
- Subclass: Caenogastropoda
- Order: Neogastropoda
- Superfamily: Conoidea
- Family: Conidae
- Genus: Conus
- Species: C. vayssierei

Binomial name
- Conus vayssierei Pallary, 1906

Synonyms
- Conus (Lautoconus) vayssierei Pallary, 1906 · accepted, alternate representation; Conus mediterraneus var. vayssierei Pallary, 1906; Lautoconus vayssierei (Pallary, 1906)

Species of sea snail

Conus vayssierei is a species of sea snail, a marine gastropod mollusk in the family Conidae, the cone snails and their allies.

Like all species within the genus Conus, these snails are predatory and venomous. They are capable of stinging humans, therefore live ones should be handled carefully or not at all.

The variety Conus vayssierei var. ossea Monterosato, 1917 is a variety of Conus vayssieri characterized by white background color and dots of purple color.

== Description ==
The length of the shell varies between 28 mm and 40 mm.

== Distribution ==
This marine species occurs in the Eastern Atlantic Ocean and in the Mediterranean Sea off North Africa.
