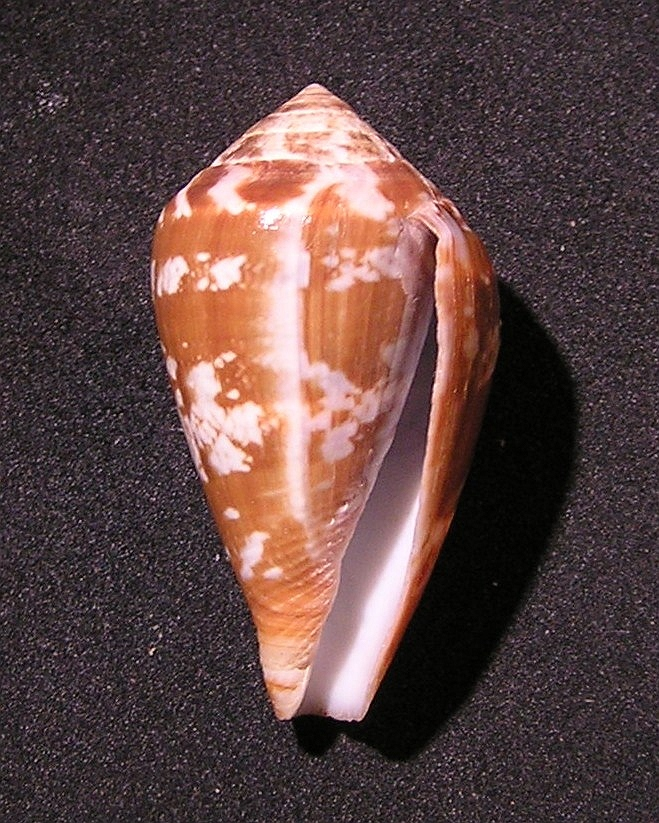
- Apertural view of Conus guinaicus

Conservation status
- Vulnerable (IUCN 3.1)

Scientific classification
- Kingdom: Animalia
- Phylum: Mollusca
- Class: Gastropoda
- Subclass: Caenogastropoda
- Order: Neogastropoda
- Superfamily: Conoidea
- Family: Conidae
- Genus: Conus
- Species: C. guinaicus

Binomial name
- Conus guinaicus Hwass in Bruguière, 1792

Synonyms
- Conus (Lautoconus) gambiensis (Petuch & Berschauer, 2018); Conus (Lautoconus) guinaicus Hwass in Bruguière, 1792; Conus (Lautoconus) pineaui Pin, 1989; Conus (Lautoconus) taslei Kiener, 1850; Conus gambiensis (Petuch & Berschauer, 2018); Conus luridus A. Adams, 1854; Conus pineaui Pin, 1989; Conus taslei Kiener, 1850; Lautoconus guinaicus Hwass in Bruguière, 1792; Lautoconus pineaui (Pin, 1989); Lautoconus taslei (Kiener, 1850); Lautoconus wolof Petuch & Berschauer, 2018; Varioconus guinaicus (Hwass in Bruguière, 1792)· accepted, alternate representation

= Conus guinaicus =

Species of sea snail

Conus guinaicus is a species of predatory sea snail, a marine gastropod mollusk. It is part of the genus Conus, more popularly known as cone snails, cone shells or cones.

== Description ==
The size of an adult shell varies between 21.6 mm and 60 mm. The inflated shell is rather thin. The spire and lower portion of the body whorl are striate. The color of the shell is chestnut or olivaceous, with usually two bands of irregular white cloudings, and scattered white spots. The aperture has a chocolate color, faintly white-banded in the middle.

== Distribution ==
This species occurs in the Atlantic Ocean off Senegal and Gambia.

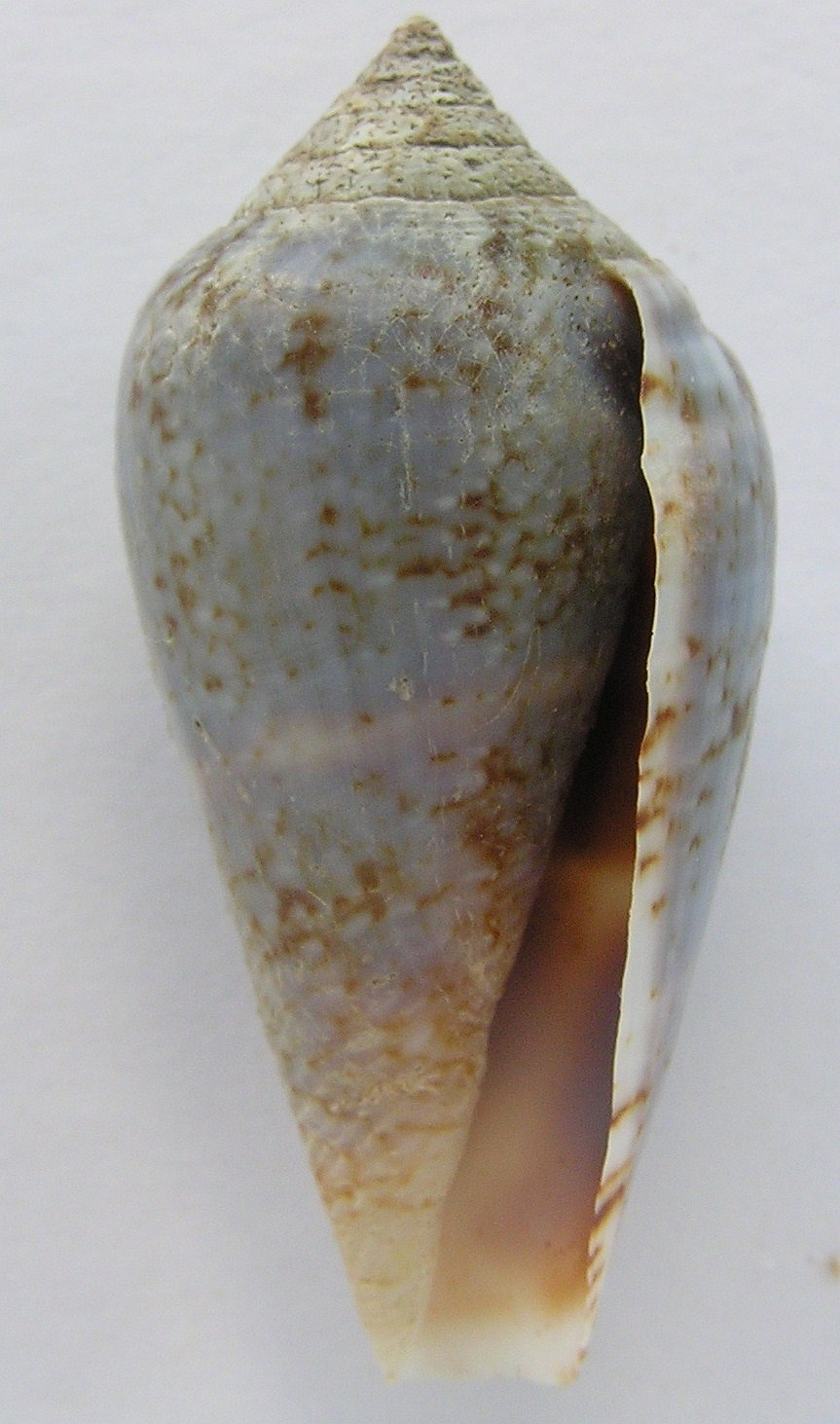
Conus guinaicus with a different color and pattern

== Gallery ==
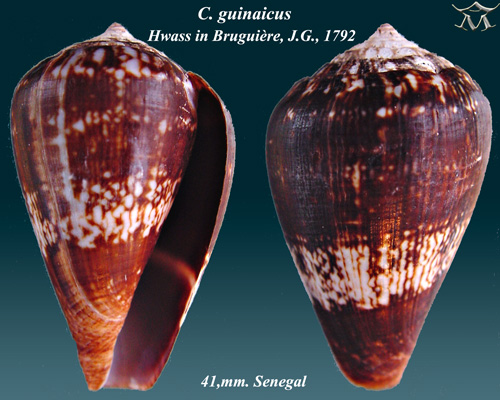
Conus guinaicus Hwass in Bruguière, J.G., 1792

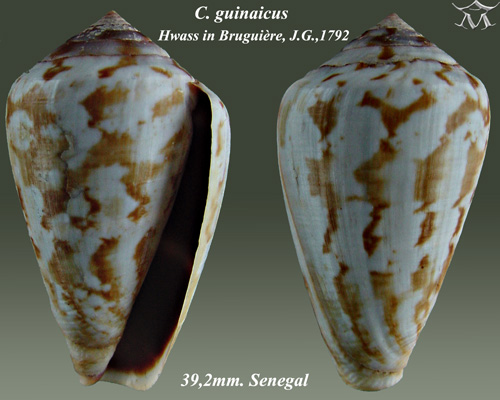
Conus guinaicus Hwass in Bruguière, J.G., 1792

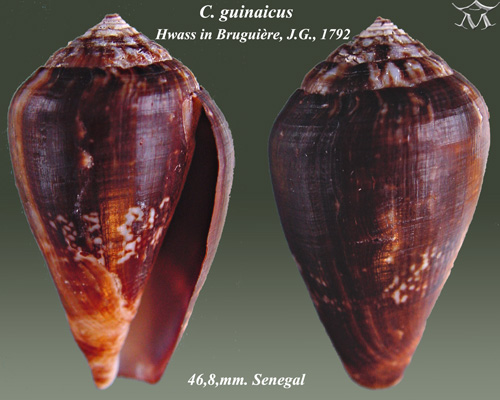
Conus guinaicus Hwass in Bruguière, J.G., 1792
