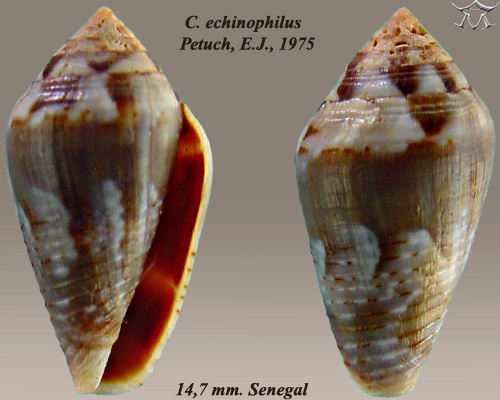
- Apertural and abapertural views of shell of Conus echinophilus Petuch, E.J., 1975
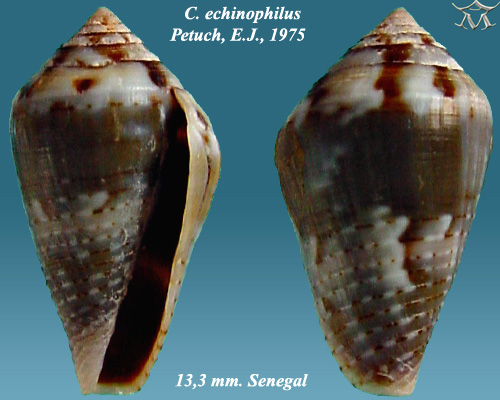

Conservation status
- Near Threatened (IUCN 3.1)

Scientific classification
- Kingdom: Animalia
- Phylum: Mollusca
- Class: Gastropoda
- Subclass: Caenogastropoda
- Order: Neogastropoda
- Superfamily: Conoidea
- Family: Conidae
- Genus: Conus
- Species: C. echinophilus

Binomial name
- Conus echinophilus (Petuch, 1975)

Synonyms
- Africonus echinophilus Petuch, 1975; Lautoconus echinophilus (Petuch, 1975); Conus (Lautoconus) echinophilus (Petuch, 1975) (alternate representation)

= Conus echinophilus =

Species of sea snail

Conus echinophilus is a species of sea snail, a marine gastropod mollusk in the family Conidae, the cone snails and their allies.

Like all species within the genus Conus, these snails are predatory and venomous. They are capable of stinging humans, therefore live ones should be handled carefully or not at all.

== Description ==
The size of the shell varies between 8 mm and 24 mm. and has brown and white mottled spots.

== Distribution ==
This species occurs in the Atlantic Ocean off Senegal, Africa.
