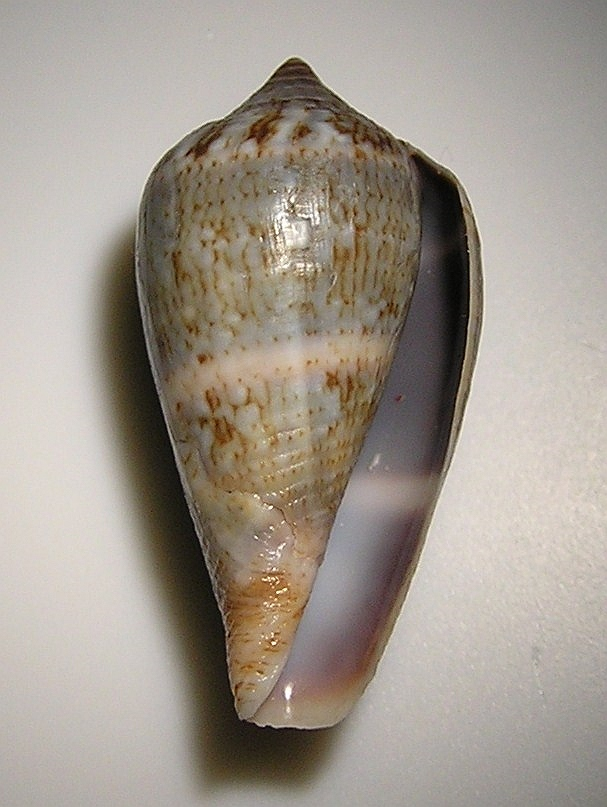
- Conus franciscanus
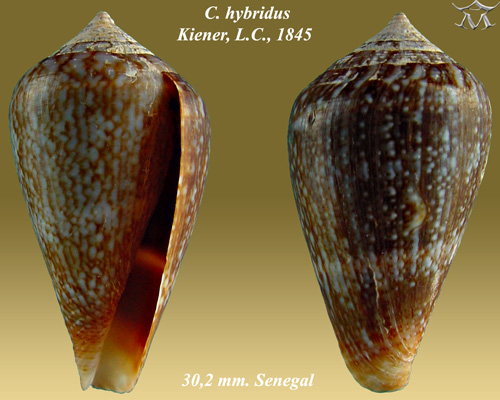

Conservation status
- Endangered (IUCN 3.1)

Scientific classification
- Kingdom: Animalia
- Phylum: Mollusca
- Class: Gastropoda
- Subclass: Caenogastropoda
- Order: Neogastropoda
- Superfamily: Conoidea
- Family: Conidae
- Genus: Conus
- Species: C. franciscanus

Binomial name
- Conus franciscanus Hwass in Bruguière, 1792

Synonyms
- Conus (Lautoconus) franciscanus Bruguière, 1792; Conus (Lautoconus) hybridus Kiener, 1847 · accepted, alternate representation; Conus hybridus Kiener, 1847; Lautoconus franciscanus (Bruguière, 1792); Lautoconus hybridus Kiener, 1845; Varioconus franciscanus (Hwass in Bruguière, 1792)· accepted, alternate representation

= Conus franciscanus =

Species of sea snail

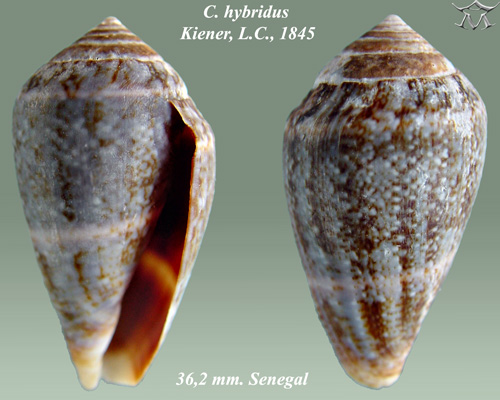
Conus hybridus Kiener, L.C., 1845

Conus franciscanus, common name the hybrid cone, is a species of sea snail, a marine gastropod mollusk in the family Conidae, the cone snails and their allies.

Like all species within the genus Conus, these snails are predatory and venomous. They are capable of stinging humans, therefore live ones should be handled carefully or not at all.

== Description ==
The size of an adult shell varies between 22 mm and 47 mm. It resembles Conus ventricosus Gmelin, 1791, but its color is darker.

== Distribution ==
This species occurs in the Atlantic Ocean off Senegal.
