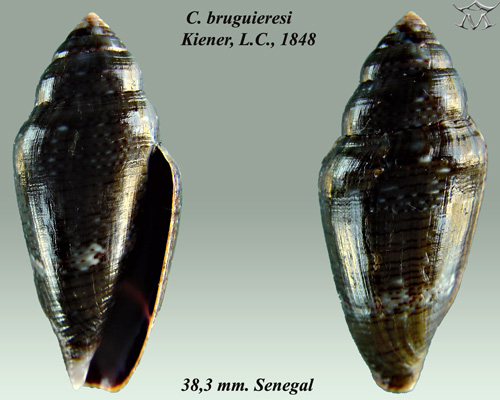
- Apertural and abapertural views of shell of Conus bruguieri Kiener, L.C., 1848
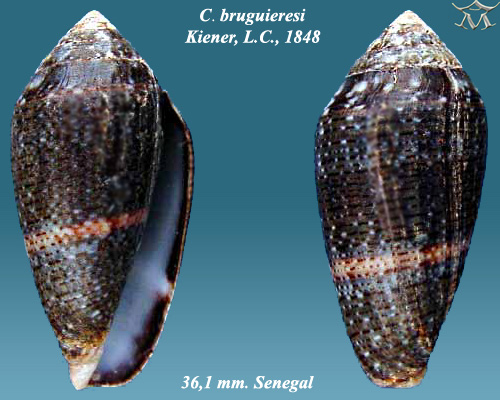

Conservation status
- Endangered (IUCN 3.1)

Scientific classification
- Kingdom: Animalia
- Phylum: Mollusca
- Class: Gastropoda
- Subclass: Caenogastropoda
- Order: Neogastropoda
- Superfamily: Conoidea
- Family: Conidae
- Genus: Conus
- Species: C. bruguieri

Binomial name
- Conus bruguieri Kiener, 1848

Synonyms
- Conus (Lautoconus) bruguieri Kiener, 1846 · accepted, alternate representation; Conus bruguieresi Kiener, 1848 (incorrect subsequent spelling); Conus bruguiersi Kiener, 1846 (spelling variation); Lautoconus bruguieri (Kiener, 1846)

= Conus bruguieri =

Species of sea snail

Conus bruguieri is a species of sea snail, a marine gastropod mollusk in the family Conidae, the cone snails and their allies.

Like all species within the genus Conus, these snails are predatory and venomous. They are capable of poisoning humans.

== Description ==
The size of the shell varies between 22 mm and 38 mm.

== Distribution ==
This species occurs in the Atlantic Ocean off Senegal.
