= Conus mercator =

- Conus mercator Linnaeus, 1758

Conservation status
- Endangered (IUCN 3.1)

Scientific classification
- Kingdom: Animalia
- Phylum: Mollusca
- Class: Gastropoda
- Subclass: Caenogastropoda
- Order: Neogastropoda
- Superfamily: Conoidea
- Family: Conidae
- Genus: Conus
- Species: C. mercator

Binomial name
- Conus mercator Linnaeus, 1758

Synonyms
- Conus (Lautoconus) cacao Ferrario, 1983; Conus (Lautoconus) fernandi (Petuch & Berschauer, 2018); Conus (Lautoconus) lamarckii Kiener, 1847; Conus (Lautoconus) mercator Linnaeus, 1758 · accepted, alternate representation; Conus (Lautoconus) orri Ninomiya & da Motta, 1982; Conus cacao Ferrario, 1983; Conus dealbatus A. Adams, 1855 (nomen dubium); Conus lamarckii Kiener, 1845; Conus orri da Motta, 1982; Conus reticularis Bory de Saint Vincent, 1827; Conus senegalensis (Gulden, Moolenbeek & Goud, 2017); Cucullus aurelius Röding, 1798; Lautoconus (Lautoconus) stimpsonorum Cossignani & Allary, 2019; Lautoconus cacao (Ferrario, 1983); Lautoconus fernandi Petuch & Berschauer, 2018; Lautoconus gambiensis Petuch & Berschauer, 2018; Lautoconus lamarckii (Kiener, 1847); Lautoconus mercator (Linnaeus, 1758); Lautoconus orri (Ninomiya & da Motta, 1982); Lautoconus rikae Petuch & Berschauer, 2018 (original combination); Lautoconus senegalensis Gulden, Moolenbeek & Goud, 2017; Lautoconus stimpsonorum Cossignani & Allary, 2019 (original combination); Varioconus mercator (Linnaeus, 1758)· accepted, alternate representation

Species of sea snail

Conus mercator, common name the trader cone, is a species of sea snail, a marine gastropod mollusk in the family Conidae, the cone snails and their allies.

Like all species within the genus Conus, these snails are predatory and venomous. They are capable of stinging humans, therefore live ones should be handled carefully or not at all.

== Description ==
The size of the shell varies between 20 mm and 55 mm. The shell is yellowish or ash-gray, often faintly longitudinally lined with chestnut, with a broad band at the shoulder and a narrower one at the middle, of white closely reticulated with chestnut.

== Distribution ==
This species occurs in the Atlantic Ocean off Senegal.

== Gallery ==
Below are several color forms:

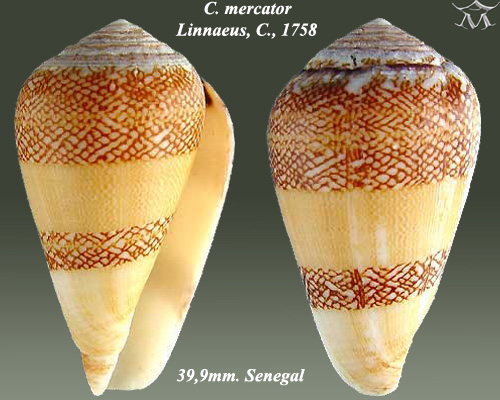
Conus mercator Linnaeus, C., 1758

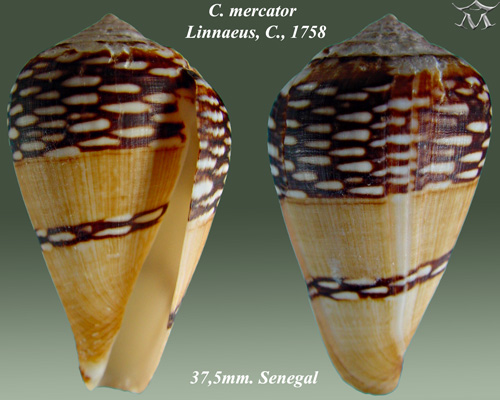
Conus mercator Linnaeus, C., 1758

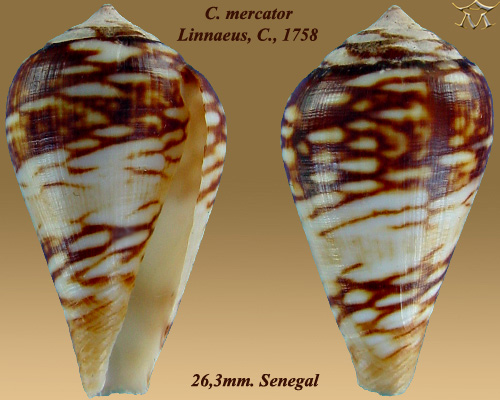
Conus mercator Linnaeus, C., 1758

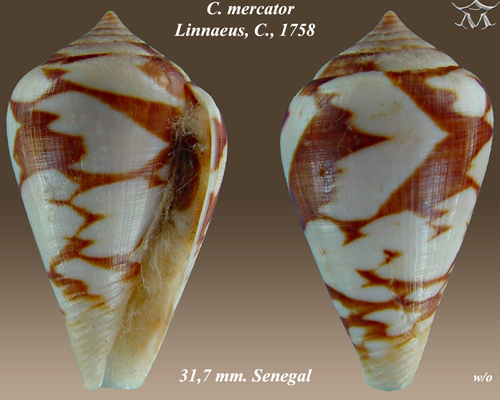
Conus mercator Linnaeus, C., 1758

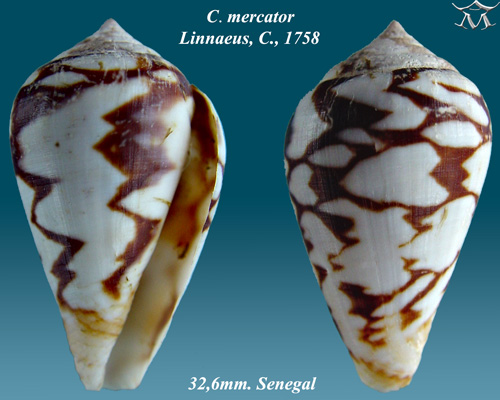
Conus mercator Linnaeus, C., 1758

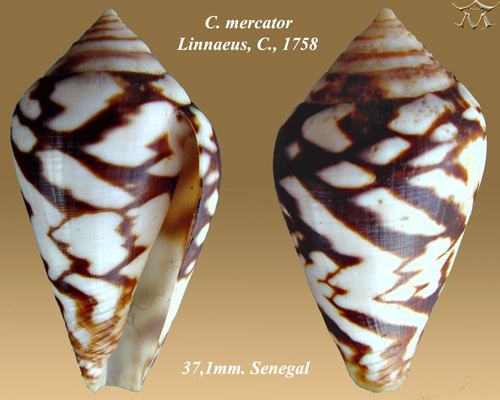
Conus mercator Linnaeus, C., 1758

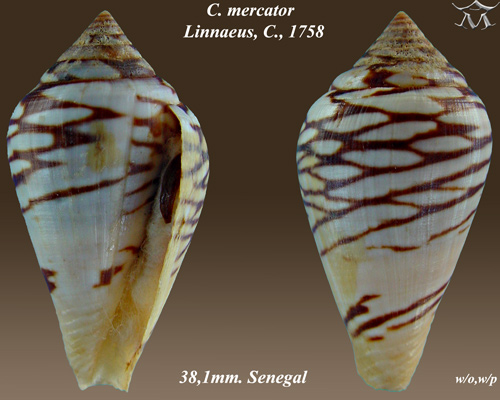
Conus mercator Linnaeus, C., 1758

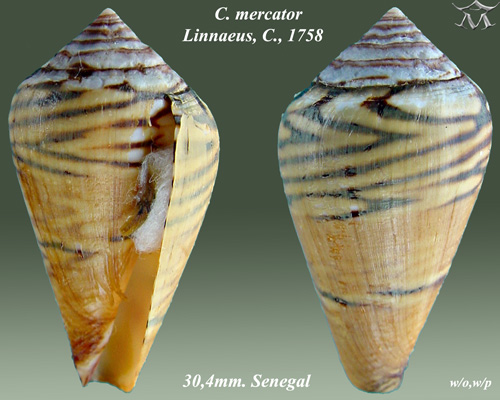
Conus mercator Linnaeus, C., 1758

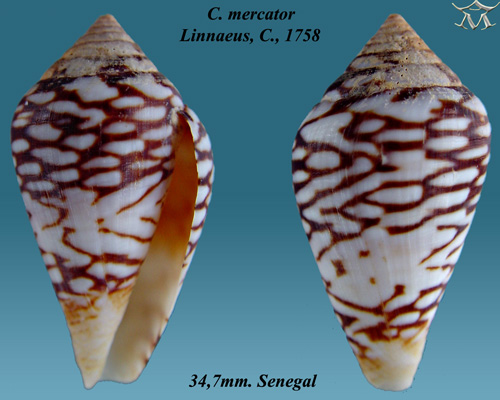
Conus mercator Linnaeus, C., 1758

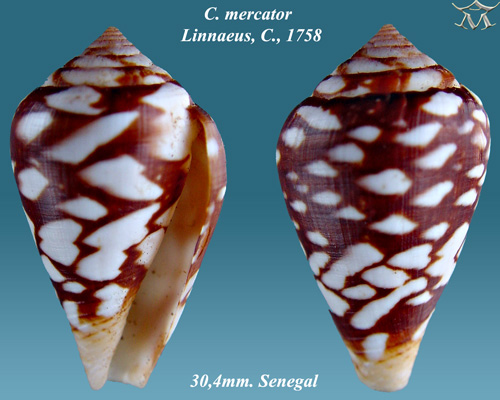
Conus mercator Linnaeus, C., 1758

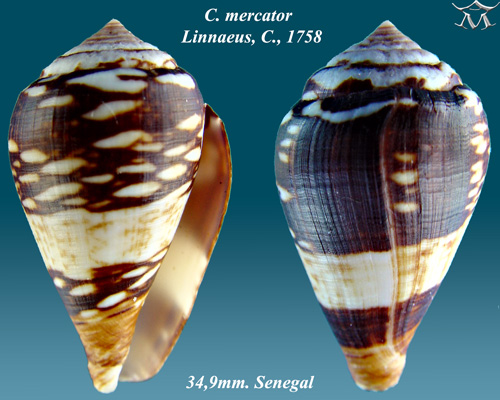
Conus mercator Linnaeus, C., 1758

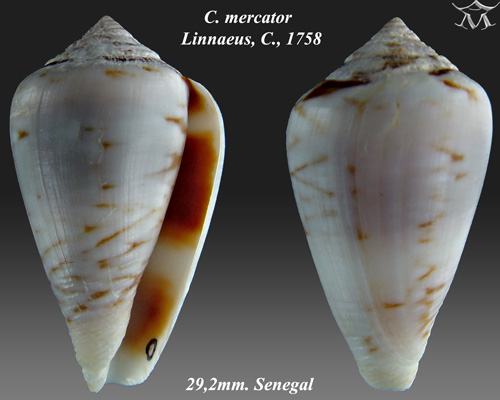
Conus mercator Linnaeus, C., 1758
