= Conus dorotheae =

Conservation status
- Near Threatened (IUCN 3.1)

Scientific classification
- Kingdom: Animalia
- Phylum: Mollusca
- Class: Gastropoda
- Subclass: Caenogastropoda
- Order: Neogastropoda
- Superfamily: Conoidea
- Family: Conidae
- Genus: Conus
- Species: C. dorotheae

Binomial name
- Conus dorotheae Monnier & Limpalaër, 2010

Synonyms
- Africonus dorothaea Monnier & Limpalaër, 2010; Conus (Lautoconus) dorotheae Monnier & Limpalaër, 2010 · accepted, alternate representation; Lautoconus dorotheae (Monnier & Limpalaër, 2010)

Species of sea snail

Conus dorotheae is a species of sea snail, a marine gastropod mollusc in the family Conidae, the cone snails and their allies.

Like all species within the genus Conus, these snails are predatory and venomous. They are capable of stinging humans, therefore live ones should be handled carefully or not at all.

== Description ==
The size of the shell varies between 25 mm and 45 mm.

== Distribution ==
This marine species is found off the Cap-Vert peninsula, Senegal, West Africa.
