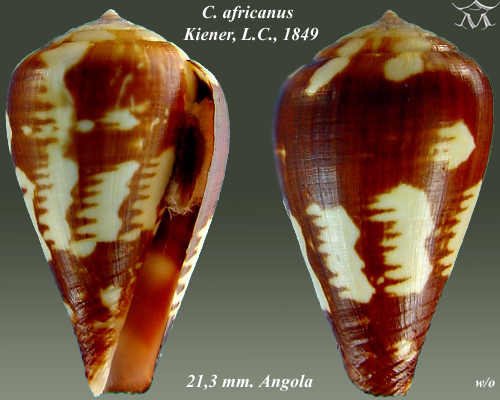
- Apertural and abapertural views of shell of Conus africanus Kiener, L.C., 1849

Conservation status
- Least Concern (IUCN 3.1)

Scientific classification
- Kingdom: Animalia
- Phylum: Mollusca
- Class: Gastropoda
- Subclass: Caenogastropoda
- Order: Neogastropoda
- Superfamily: Conoidea
- Family: Conidae
- Genus: Conus
- Species: C. africanus

Binomial name
- Conus africanus Kiener, 1845

Synonyms
- Conus (Lautoconus) africanus Kiener, 1848 · accepted, alternate representation; Conus neoafricanus da Motta, 1991 (unnecessary replacement name for Conus africanus Kiener, 1848, by da Motta believed to be preoccupied by "Conus africanus Meuschen" (published in a rejected work)); Varioconus africanus Kiener, L.C., 1845

= Conus africanus =

Species of sea snail

Conus africanus, common name the African cone, is a species of predatory sea snail, a marine gastropod mollusk in the family Conidae, the cone snails, cone shells or cones.

Like all species within the genus Conus, these snails are predatory and venomous. They are capable of stinging humans, therefore live ones should be handled carefully or not at all.

This species has been recently declared "least concern" in 2012, after it had been declared "vulnerable" on the IUCN Red List in 1996.

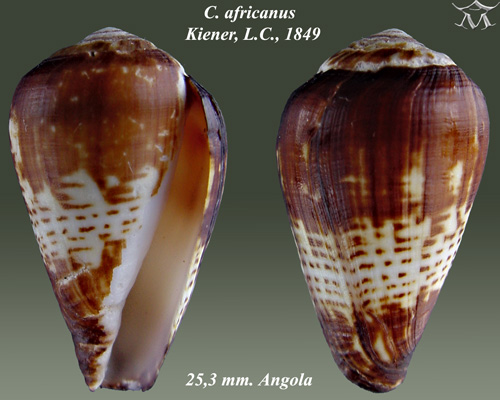
Conus africanus Kiener, L.C., 1849

== Description ==
The size of the shell varies between 13 mm and 30 mm.

== Distribution ==
This marine species is endemic to Angola and West Africa.
